= List of Moroccan people =

This list of Moroccan people includes people who were born in Morocco and people who are of Moroccan ancestry, who are significantly notable for their life and/or work.

== Academics ==
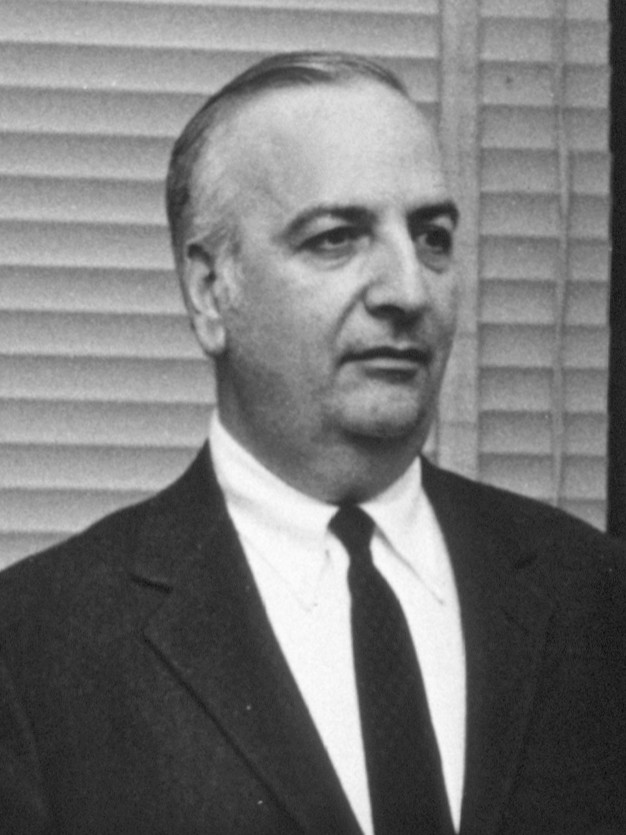
Baruj Benacerraf

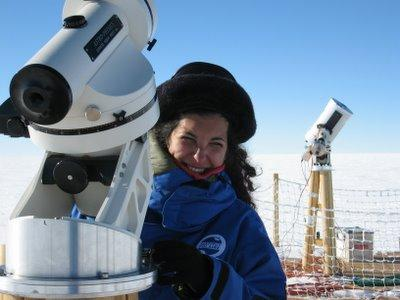
Merieme Chadid

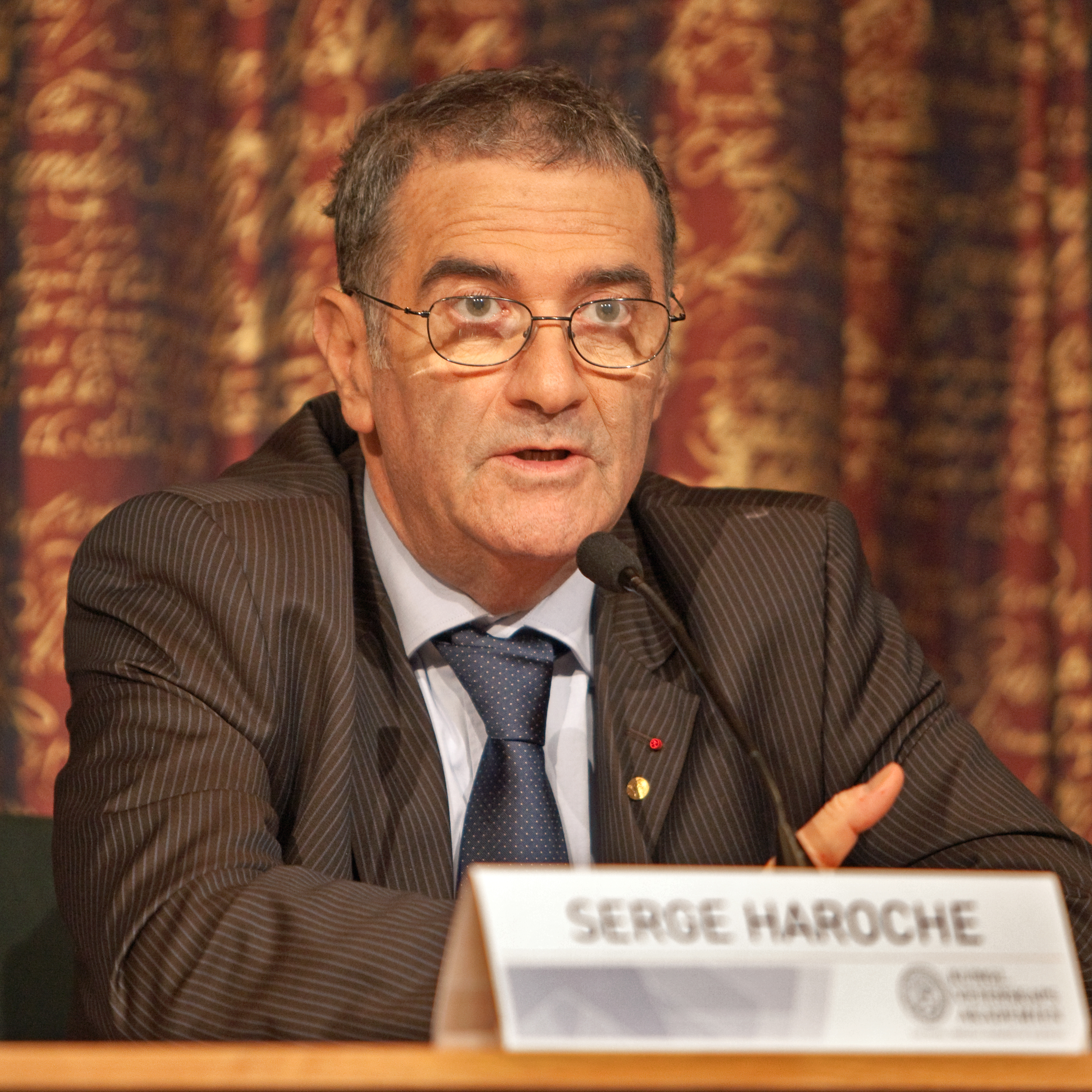
Serge Haroche

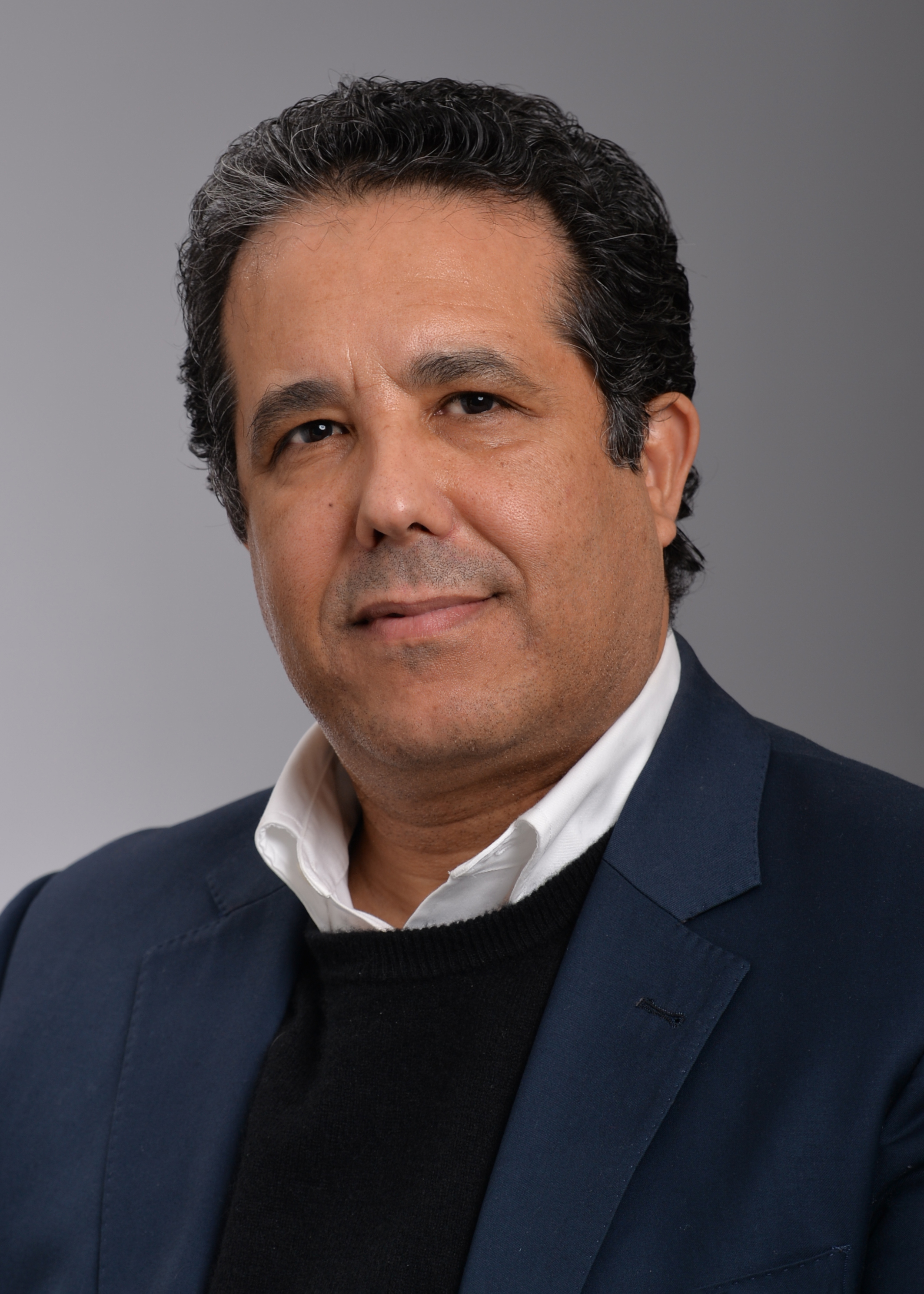
Kamal Benslama

- Michel Abitbol, Moroccan-born Israeli historian, professor and chair of the Department of African Studies at the Hebrew University of Jerusalem.
- Robert Assaraf (1936–2018), Moroccan-born French historian
- David Assouline, Moroccan-born French historian and politician
- Moshe Bar-Asher (Moshe Ben Harush), Moroccan-born Israeli linguist and the president of the Academy of the Hebrew Language in Jerusalem.
- Baruj Benacerraf (1920–2011), Venezuelan-born American immunologist, Nobel Prize in Physiology or Medicine
- Paul Benacerraf (1930–2025), American philosopher working in the field of the philosophy of mathematics who taught at Princeton University
- Shlomo Ben-Ami (born Shlomo Benabou), Moroccan-born Israeli scholar, diplomat and former politician
- Samuel Benchimol (1923–2002), Brazilian economist, scientist and one of the leading experts on the Amazon region
- Sara Bendahan (1906–1946), first Venezuelan woman to complete her medical studies in Venezuela
- Alegría Bendayán de Bendelac, Venezuelan philologist, professor, writer and poet
- Kamal Benslama, Moroccan experimental particle physicist and professor of physics in the USA. Selected in 2020 as a person of extraordinary ability in Sciences by the US Government.
- David Bensoussan, Moroccan-born Canadian historian, author, and educator
- Georges Bensoussan, Moroccan-born French historian
- Latifa El Bouhsini, Moroccan professor and scholar on the history of the Moroccan feminist movement and women's rights issues.
- Nadia Bouras, Dutch historian
- David Cazès, Moroccan Jewish writer and educator
- Merieme Chadid, astronomer and researcher
- Rajaâ Cherkaoui El Moursli, Moroccan nuclear physicist. Winner of a L'Oréal-UNESCO Award for Women in Science for her work on the Higgs Boson.
- Sami Shalom Chetrit, Moroccan Israeli University professor, Hebrew poet and Peace activist.
- Isaac Chocrón (1930–2011), Venezuelan economist, playwright and translator.
- Claude Cohen-Tannoudji (1933–2026), Algerian-born French physicist who won the 1997 Nobel Prize in Physics (with Steven Chu and William Daniel Phillips)
- Henriette Dahan Kalev, Moroccan-born Israeli scholar, founder of the Gender Studies Program at Ben Gurion University.
- Yossi Dahan, Moroccan-born Israeli scholar, law professor, and the Head of the Human Rights Division at the College of Law and Business.
- Yvette Duval (née Benchettrit) (1931–2006), Moroccan-born French historian who specialized in North Africa during Antiquity.
- Latifa Elouadrhiri, Moroccan experimental physicist and researcher
- Mahdi Elmandjra, Moroccan futurologist
- Abdul Salam Al Haras, Moroccan professor considered one of the pioneers of Islamic work in Morocco
- Serge Haroche, Moroccan-born French physicist who was awarded the 2012 Nobel Prize for Physics
- Saïda Hossini, Moroccan palaeontologist, specializing in frogs of the Pleistocene.
- Eva Illouz, Moroccan-born Israeli scholar, professor of sociology at the Hebrew University in Jerusalem.
- Raphael Israeli, Moroccan-born Israeli scholar, Professor Emeritus of Middle Eastern, Islamic and Chinese history at the Hebrew University of Jerusalem.
- Asma Lamrabet, Moroccan doctor, scholar, Islamic feminist and author
- Marcelle Machluf, Moroccan-born Israeli biologist, director of the Laboratory for Cancer Drug Delivery & Cell Based Technologies
- Lamia Messari-Becker, German-Moroccan civil engineer, professor of building technology and physics, expert of sustainable design and urban development, member of Club of Rome
- Naoual Oukkache, Moroccan toxicologist and herpetologist
- Adnane Remmal, Moroccan biologist
- Avraham Avi Simhon, Israeli economist
- Hourya Benis Sinaceur, Moroccan philosopher
- Daniel Sivan, specialist of Hebrew language from Ben-Gurion University of the Negev
- Moncef Slaoui, chief adviser of Operation Warp Speed
- Mohammed Amine Smaili, theologian and author
- Abdelhadi Tazi (1921–2015), scholar, writer, historian, and former Moroccan ambassador in various countries
- Rachid Yazami, co-inventor of the lithium-ion battery
- Mimoun Azizi, German-Moroccan neurologist, philosopher, political scientist and sociologist. Head of a German clinic
- Haim Zafrani, Moroccan historian, specialist of Moroccan and North African history and Mediterranean Jewish history

== Activists ==
Abraham Serfaty

- Mustapha Adib, human rights activist
- Reuven Abergel, Saadia Marciano and Charlie Biton, Moroccan-born Israeli activists, founders of the Israeli Black Panthers
- Hélène Cazès-Benatar (1898–1979), Moroccan human rights activist and the country's first female lawyer
- Fatna El Bouih, democracy activist who was imprisoned during the Years of Lead
- Kacem El Ghazzali, secular blogger and activist
- Carmen Elmakiyes, Amos, Israeli social and political activist, medical clown, and filmmaker
- Lamya Essemlali, French environmental activist, chairperson of Sea Shepherd France
- Latifa Ibn Ziaten, French-Moroccan activist
- Miriam Peretz (née Ohayon), Moroccan-born Israeli educator and activist
- Mohamed Rabbae, Dutch-Moroccan politician and activist
- Rudy Rochman, French-born Israeli-Jewish rights activist
- Abraham Serfaty, prominent dissident, militant, and political activist
- Mordechai Vanunu, Israeli activist

== Actors ==
- Zineb Triki

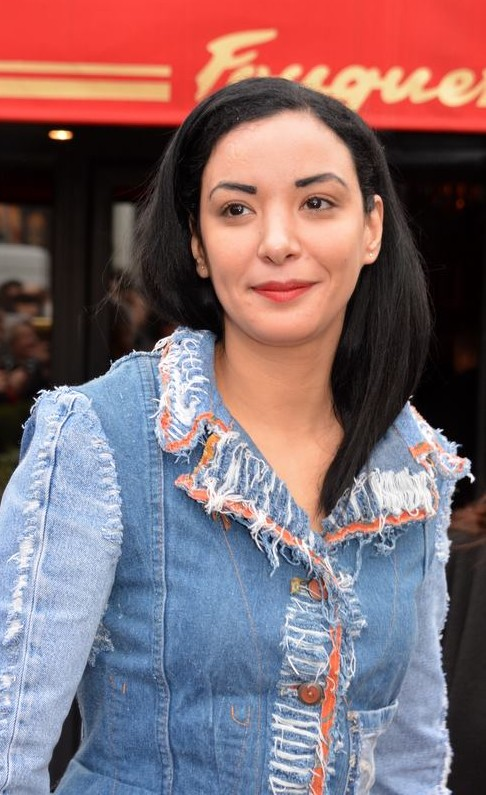
Loubna Abidar

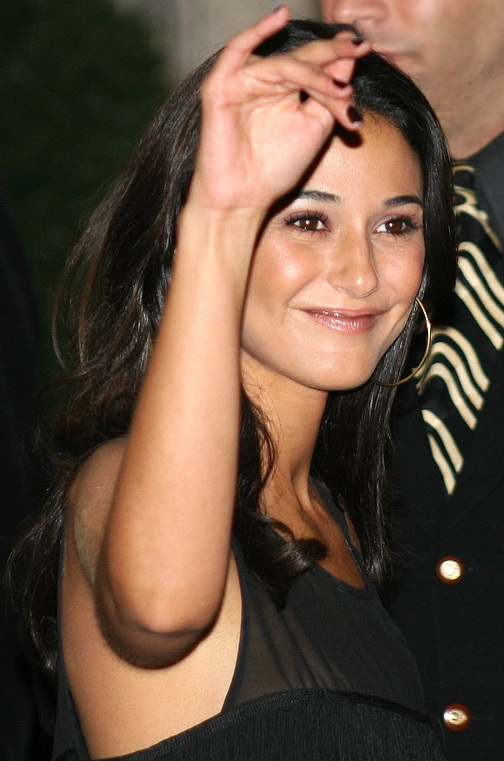
Emmanuelle Chriqui

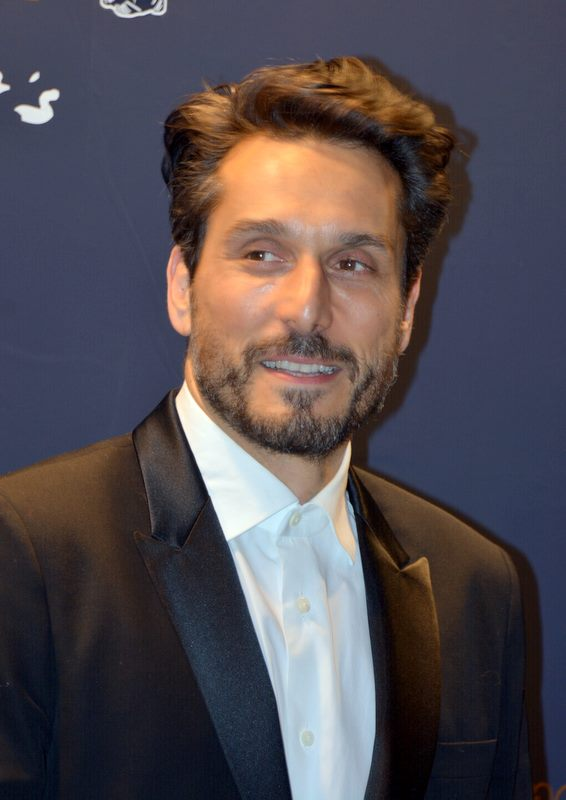
Vincent Elbaz

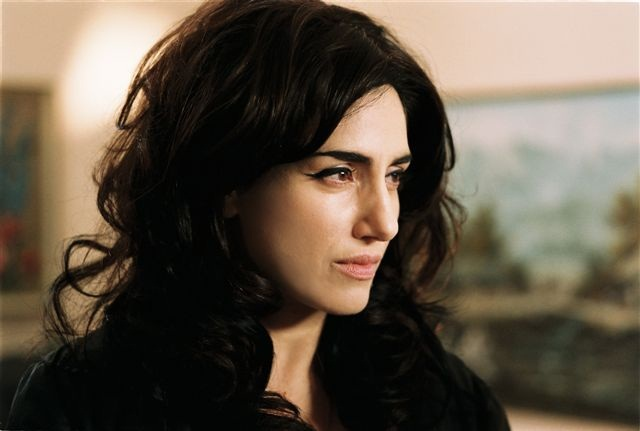
Ronit Elkabetz

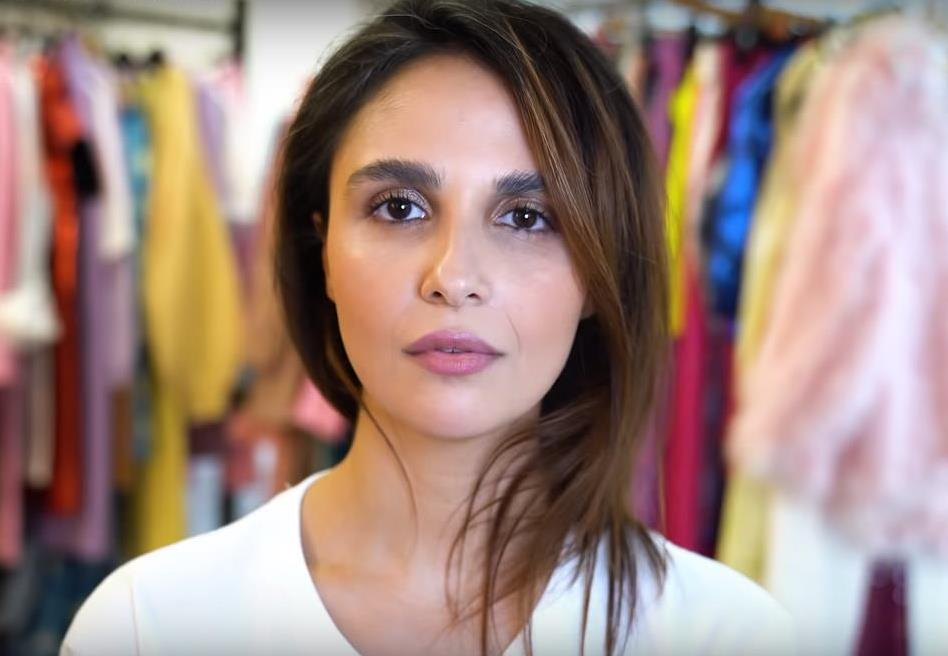
Maryam Hassouni

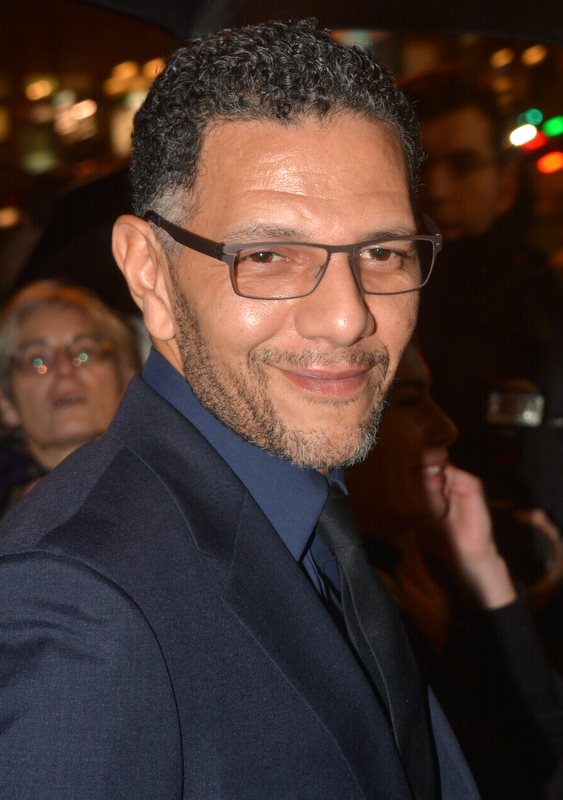
Roschdy Zem

- Mustapha Aarab, Moroccan actor
- Avital Abergel, Israeli actress
- Ahmed Salah Abdelfatah, Dutch actor
- Yael Abecassis, Israeli actress
- Loubna Abidar, Moroccan actress
- Morjana Alaoui, Moroccan actress
- Sanâa Alaoui, French-Moroccan actress
- Fu'ad Aït Aattou, French actor
- Achmed Akkabi, Dutch actor
- Natacha Amal, Belgian actress
- Oulaya Amamra, French actress
- Najib Amhali, Moroccan-born Dutch stand-up comedian and actor
- Reymond Amsalem, Israeli actress
- Richard Anconina, French actor
- Shiri Appleby, American actress
- Moran Atias, Israeli actress
- Aure Atika, French actress
- Amal Ayouch, stage and film actress
- Mohammed Azaay, Moroccan-born Dutch actor
- Lubna Azabal, Belgian actress
- Shmil Ben Ari, Israeli actor
- Samuel Benchetrit, French actor, scenarist, writer and director
- Marc Bendavid, Canadian actor
- Amador Bendayán, Venezuelan actor and comedian
- Omar Berdouni, Moroccan actor
- Raquel Bitton, singer, French actress, scenarist, writer, producer
- Miri Bohadana, Israeli actress and TV presentator.
- Mohammed Chaara, Dutch actor
- Touria Chaoui (1936–1956), actress, first female Moroccan to gain a pilots license
- Emmanuelle Chriqui, Canadian actress
- Philippe Clair (Charles Bensoussan), Moroccan-born French actor, director, producer and screenwriter
- Paul Danan, British actor
- Gérard Darmon, Algerian-born French actor. He was granted the Moroccan citizenship in 2012.
- Nasrdin Dchar Dutch actor and presenter
- Adam Deacon, British actor and rapper
- Vincent Elbaz, French actor
- Jérémie Elkaïm, French actor
- Houda Echouafni, Moroccan actress
- Mehdi El Glaoui, French actor
- Mina El Hammani, Spanish actress
- Ronit Elkabetz, Israeli actress
- Ouidad Elma, French-Moroccan actress
- Mamoun Elyounoussi, Dutch actor
- Nabil Elouahabi, British actor
- Nadia Farès, French actress
- Nora Fatehi, Canadian actress and dancer who works in Indian cinema
- Jenette Goldstein, American actress
- Tzachi Halevy, Israeli actor, singer and musician
- Evelin Hagoel, Moroccan-born Israeli actress
- Maryam Hassouni, Dutch actress
- Aharon Ipalé, Moroccan-born Israeli actor
- Dana Ivgy, Israeli actress
- Moshe Ivgy, Moroccan-born Israeli actor
- Touriya Jabrane (Saadia Kraytif), Moroccan actress, theatre director and politician
- Paul Karo, Australian actor
- Shlomi Koriat, Israeli actor and comedian
- Yasmine Lafitte (Hafida El Khabchi), Moroccan-born French pornographic actress
- Karen Lancaume (Karine Bach), French pornographic actress
- Inbar Lavi, Israeli actress
- Danny Nucci, Italian-American actor
- Mimoun Oaïssa, Moroccan-born Dutch actor
- Mimoun Ouled Radi, Dutch actor
- Zineb Oukach, Moroccan actress and model
- Ze'ev Revach, Moroccan-born Israeli actor, comedian and director
- Laila Rouass, British actress
- Daniela Ruah, Portuguese-American actress
- Agam Rudberg, Israeli actress and model
- Nasser Saleh, Spanish actor
- Rosalinda Serfaty, Argentinian actress
- Leila Shenna, Moroccan former actress
- Benjamin Siksou, French actor and singer
- Noah Schnapp, American-Canadian actor
- Saïd Taghmaoui, French and American actor
- Elisa Tovati, French actress and singer
- Zineb Triki, French-Moroccan actress
- Jake Weber, British actor
- Roschdy Zem, French actor and director

== Beauty pageant ==
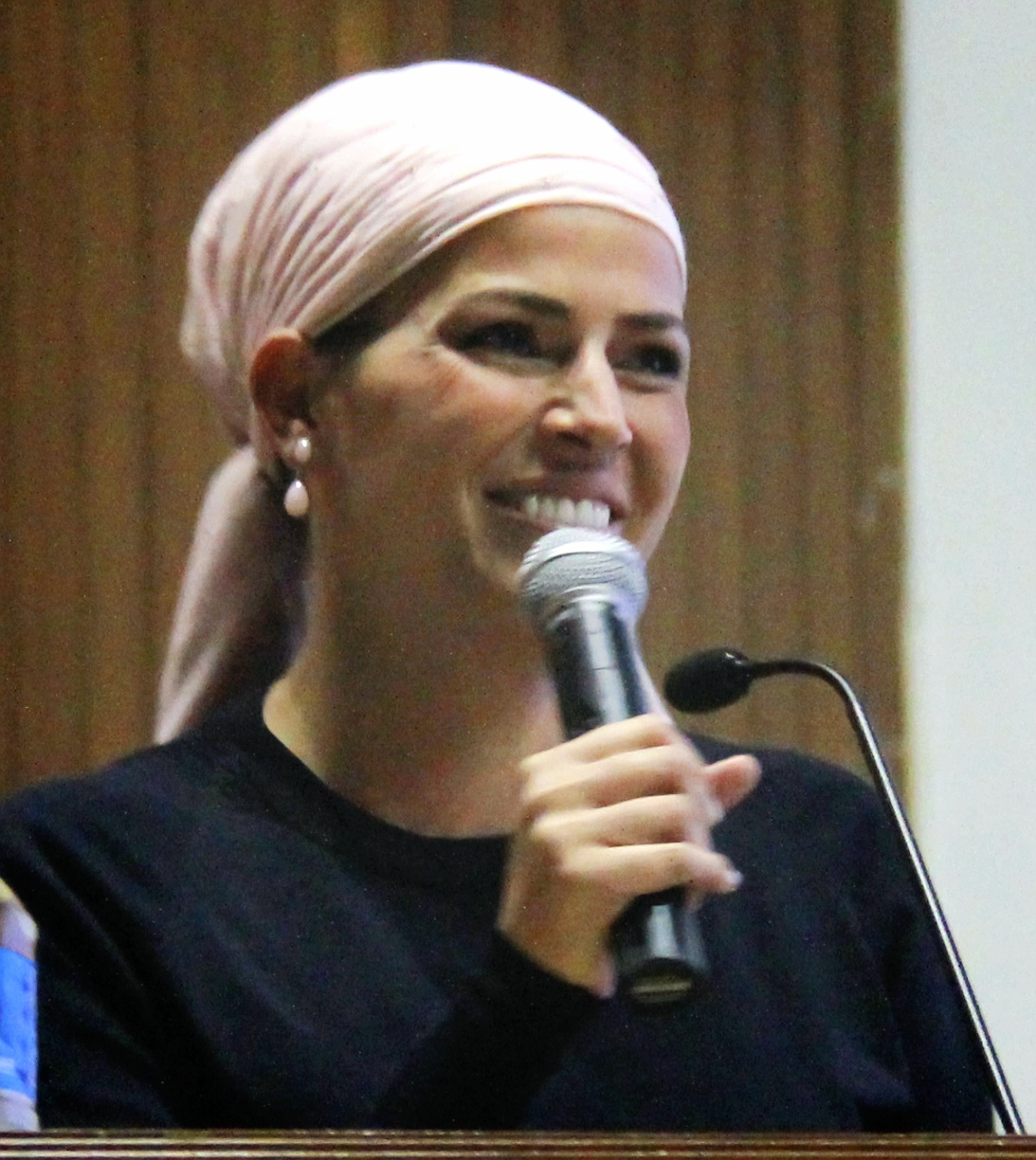
Linor Abargil

- Linor Abargil, Israeli beauty pageant winner who was crowned Miss Israel 1998 and Miss World 1998.
- Kim Edri, Israeli beauty pageant winner who runner-up at Miss Israel 2011
- Sara Chafak, Finnish beauty pageant winner who was crowned Miss Finland 2012 and represented Finland in Miss Universe 2012
- Halima Chehaima, Belgian beauty pageant winner who was crowned Miss Brussels 2007 and represented Belgium in Miss World 2007
- Maroua Kharbouch, Gibraltarian beauty pageant winner who was crowned Miss Gibraltar 2013 and was named at Miss World 2013
- Shani Hazan, Israeli beauty pageant winner who was crowned Miss Israel 2012, and represented Israel in Miss Universe 2012
- Mor Maman, Israeli beauty pageant winner who was crowned Miss Israel 2014

== Business people and entrepreneurs ==
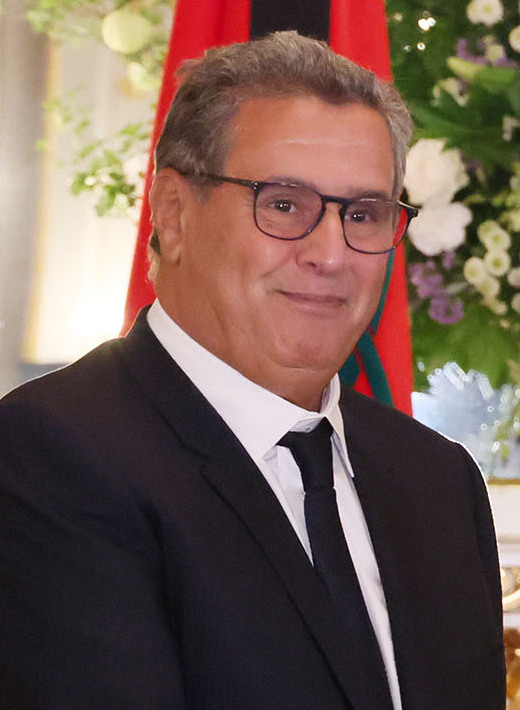
Aziz Akhannouch

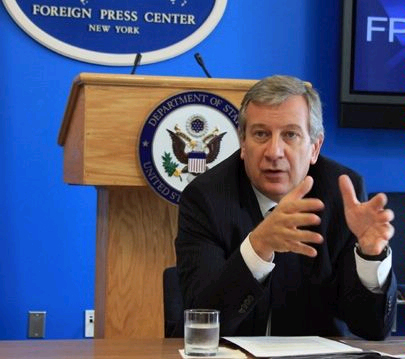
Richard Attias

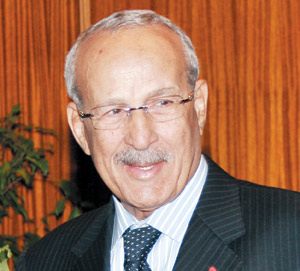
Miloud Chaabi

- Sylvain Abitbol, Canadian engineer and entrepreneur in the telecommunications industry as CEO of NHC Communications Inc
- Abdeslam Ahizoune, businessman, former chairman and chief executive officer of Maroc Telecom
- Aziz Akhannouch, businessman and current Prime Minister of Morocco
- Modar Alaoui, Moroccan-American serial entrepreneur based in Silicon Valley, California in the United States
- Nezha Alaoui, Moroccan entrepreneur and founder of the Mayshad brand
- Rachid Omar, (1949-2024), Moroccan entrepreneur, hotelier, and real estate developer
- David Amar (1920–2000), Moroccan businessman, leader of the Moroccan Jewish community, politician, and philanthropist
- Richard Attias, businessman, events producer, founder and former chairman of PublicisLive and presently the executive chairman of Richard Attias and Associates
- Elie Azagury (1918–2009), Moroccan architect, considered the first Moroccan modernist architect
- Bettina Banoun, Norwegian barrister and businesswoman
- Alain J. P. Belda, Canadian-Moroccan businessman, former CEO of Alcoa
- Naziha Belkeziz, Moroccan banker and Chairman and Chief Executive Officer (CEO) of Banque Centrale Populaire
- Isaac Benayon Sabba, Brazilian entrepreneur, founder of the IB Sabbá Ltda. group and Petroleo Sabbá S.A.
- Yoshua Bengio, French-Canadian computer scientist, most noted for his work on artificial neural networks and deep learning
- Othman Benjelloun, Moroccan businessman CEO of the BMCE
- Albert "Aldo" Bensadoun, Moroccan-born Canadian businessman, founder and chief executive of the ALDO Group
- Miriem Bensalah-Chaqroun, Moroccan businesswoman
- Dror Benshetrit, Israeli artist, designer and inventor based in New York City.
- Babette Bensoussan, Australian author and competitive intelligence specialist, who has written several books on competitive intelligence and analysis.
- Moses Bensusan, Canadian-American real estate developer CEO of Liberty Grande and Logictech Construction Group.
- Jacky Ben-Zaken
- Miloud Chaabi
- Joseph Chetrit, Moroccan American real estate investor and developer
- Salomón Cohen Levy, Venezuelan-Israeli engineer and a real estate businessman
- Albert Dadon, Moroccan Australian businessman
- Patrick Drahi, Moroccan businessman CEO of telecom group Altice
- Victor Drai, Moroccan American night-club owner
- Victor Elmaleh (1918–2014), Moroccan-born American businessman and real estate developer
- Mahdi ElMandjra
- Sonia Gardner (née Lasry), Moroccan American billionaire hedge fund manager and co-founder of hedge fund Avenue Capital Group.
- Salwa Idrissi Akhannouch, businesswoman, the founder and CEO of the Aksal Group
- Daniel Iffla, French financier and philanthropist
- Amina Lahbabi-Peters, branding, marketing and Communication for Development specialist
- Marc Lasry, Moroccan American billionaire hedge fund manager and co-founder and chief executive officer of hedge fund Avenue Capital Group
- Maurice Lévy, Moroccan French businessman, CEO of Publicis
- Sarah Saddouk, French-Moroccan, Head of Innovation and Strategy of BNC Publishing, entrepreneur.com
- David Serero, French award-winning architect
- Driss Temsamani, Managing Director at Citygroup, author, and public speaker specializing in digital transformation, financial technology, and diaspora advocacy.
- Mostafa Terrab, businessman, current CEO of the Moroccan state-owned phosphate-mining company OCP
- Ralph Toledano, French-Moroccan businessman
- Sidney Toledano, French-Moroccan businessman, CEO of LMVH Fashion Group since February 2018, and former CEO of Fashion House Dior.

== Comedians ==
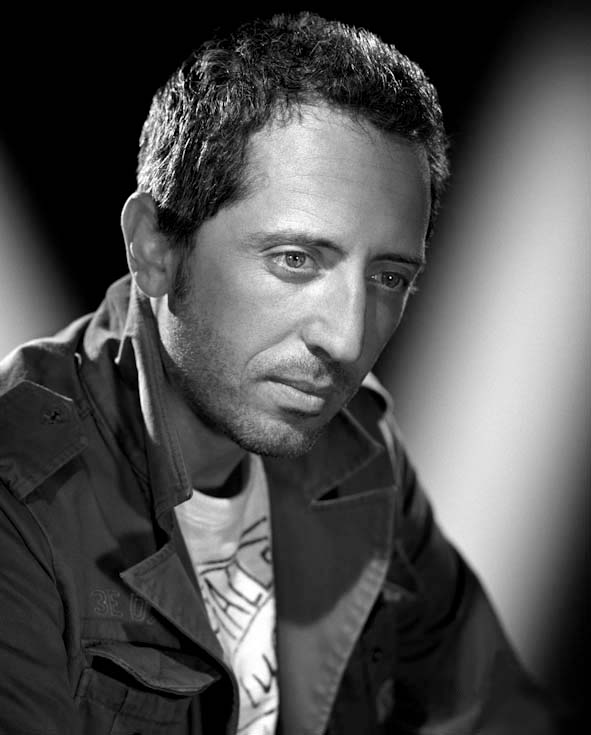
Gad Elmaleh

- Ary Abittan, French stand-up comedian
- Najib Amhali, Dutch-Moroccan stand-up comedian and actor
- Rachid Badouri, Canadian-Moroccan stand-up comedian
- Jamel Debbouze, French-Moroccan stand-up comedian, actor and producer
- Hanane el-Fadili, Moroccan comedian and actress
- Gad Elmaleh, French-Moroccan stand-up comedian, actor and producer
- Anne Roumanoff, French humorist and actress
- Élie Semoun, French stand-up comedian and actor
- Soufiane El Khalidy, Moroccan actor, filmmaker and writer

== Directors and producers ==
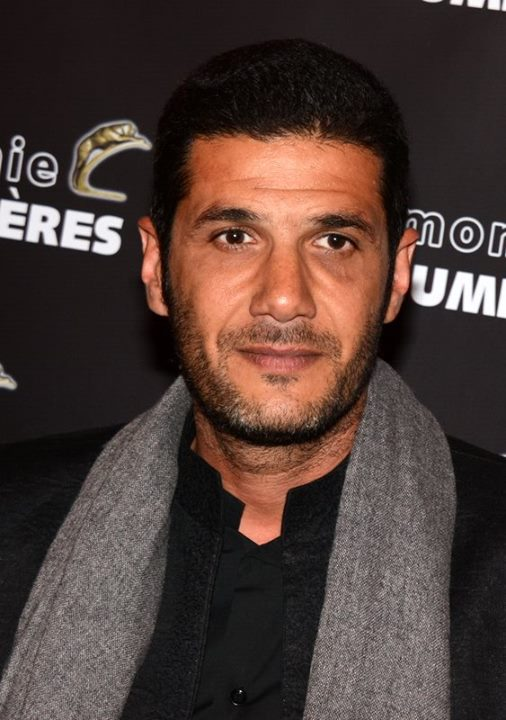
Nabil Ayouch

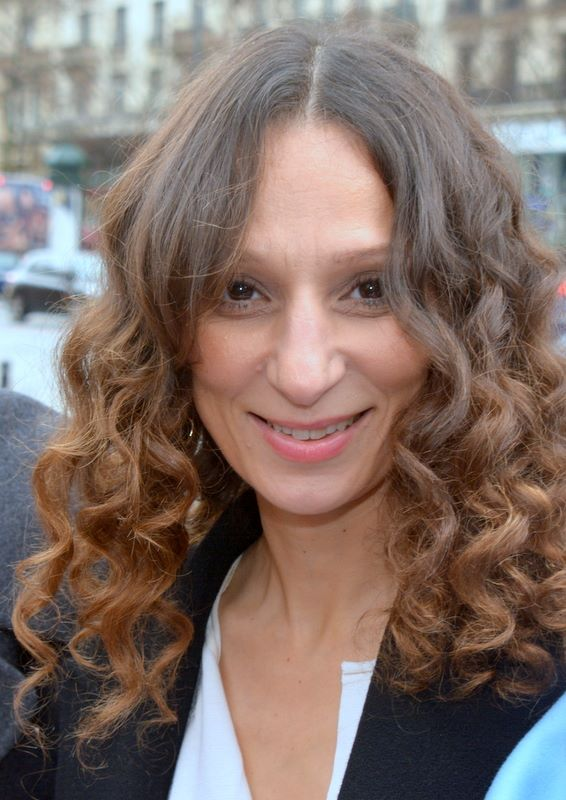
Houda Benyamina

- Abdou Achouba, Moroccan filmmaker, film-critic, and producer
- Dan Attias, American television director and producer
- Nabil Ayouch, Moroccan French film director
- Lisa Azuelos, French director
- Jom Tob Azulay, Brazilian producer, director, writer, director of photography and soundman
- Margot Benacerraf
- Hicham Bennir, Canadian director cinematographer editor and photographer
- Faouzi Bensaïdi
- Jacques Bensimon, Canadian public film and television director, producer and executive in Canada
- Houda Benyamina, French director
- Simone Bitton
- André Elbaz
- Ronit Elkabetz, Israeli filmmaker, screenwriter, and actress
- Shlomi Elkabetz, Israeli filmmaker, screenwriter, and actor
- Olivier Dahan, French filmmaker
- Ismaël Ferroukhi
- Sanaa Hamri
- Tala Hadid
- Laila Marrakchi
- Hakim Nouri
- Michèle Ohayon, Academy Award-nominated film director, screenwriter and producer
- Mohamed Reggab, film director
- Heinz Tietjen
- Abdelhadi Tazi
- Éric Toledano, French filmmaker
- Malika Zouhali-Worrall

== Fashion (designers, models) ==
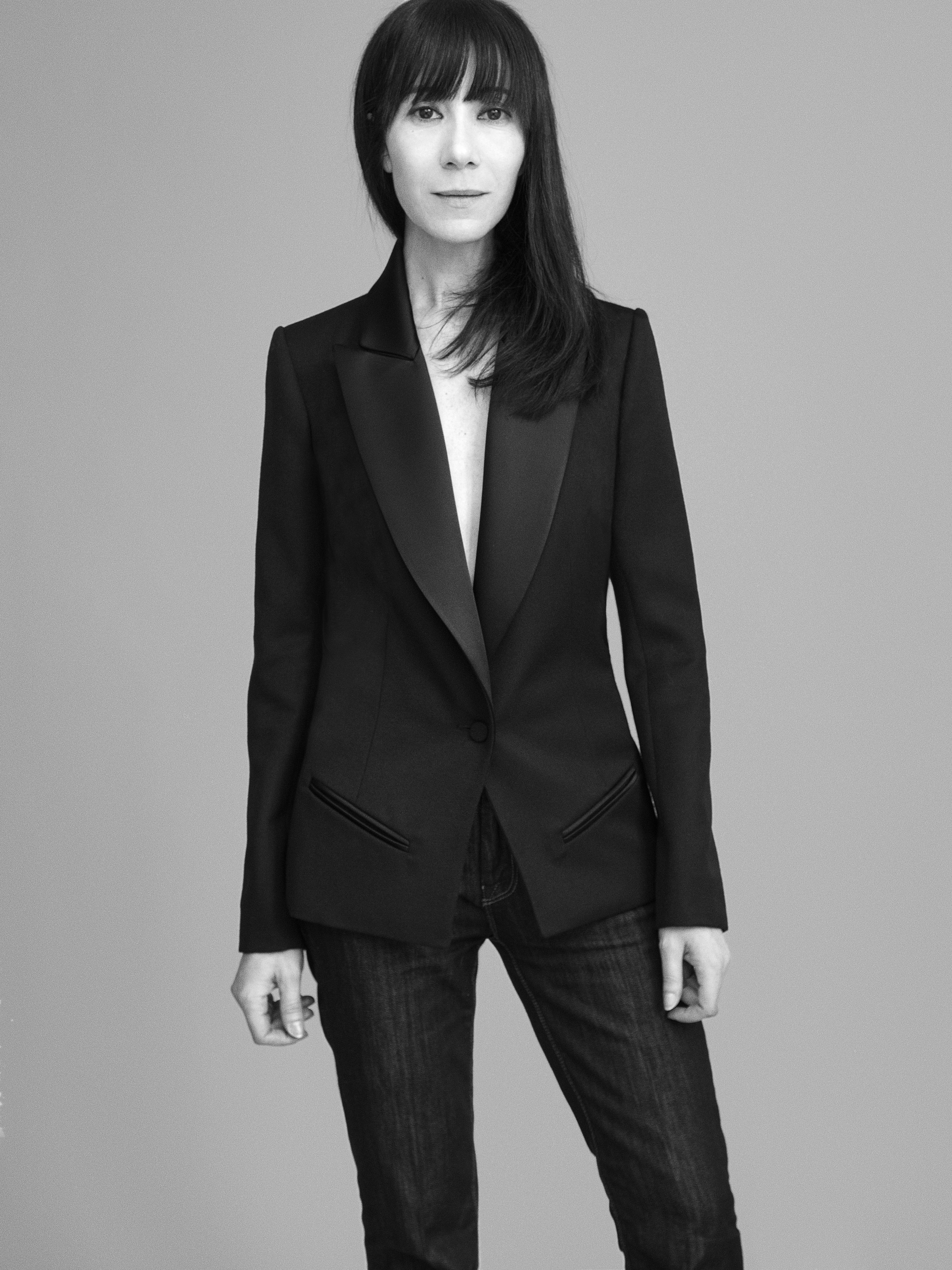
Bouchra Jarrar, French haute couture designer

- Karima Adebibe, British model
- Nora Attal, British model
- Yigal Azrouël, Israeli American New York based fashion designer
- Elena Benarroch, Moroccan-Spanish fashion designer
- Sara Chafak, Finnish model, winner of Miss Finland 2012
- Alber Elbaz, Moroccan-born Israeli fashion designer, who worked for the Lanvin house
- Joseph Ettedgui, British-Moroccan retailer, designer and founder of the Joseph brand
- Bouchra Jarrar, French haute couture fashion designer for Balenciaga and Lanvin
- Shlomit Malka, Israeli fashion model and television host.
- Paul Marciano, American-Moroccan fashion designer and co-founder of GUESS? Inc
- Joe Mimran, Canadian-Moroccan fashion designer and entrepreneur
- Pnina Tornai (Pnina Assis), Israeli fashion and wedding dress designer, reality and daytime TV personality
- Imaan Hammam, Dutch fashion model of Moroccan and Egyptian descent

== Historical figures ==
- Al-Marrakushi
- Ahmed el Inglizi
- Averroes (Abu El Walid Muhammad Ibn Ahmad Ibn Rushd)
- Judah ben David Hayyuj
- Maimonides
- Merieme Chadid
- Mohammed El Ifrani
- Moses Elias Levy
- Mouha ou Hammou Zayani, military figure who played an important role in the fight against French colonials
- Muhammad al-Idrisi
- Muhammad al-Muqri
- Muhammad Ben 'Abd al-Karim al-Khattabi
- Muley Xeque (1566–1621), Moroccan noble who converted to Catholicism in the 16th century
- Mohammed Abed Al-Jabri
- Robert Purvis (4 August 1810 – 15 April 1898), American abolitionist in the United States
- David Pallache, member of the Pallache family
- Isaac Pallache, member of the Pallache family
- Joseph Pallache, member of the Pallache family
- Moses Pallache, member of the Pallache family
- Solika, famous Jewish martyr of the 19th century
- Ibn battuta, famous explorer
- Tariq ibn Ziyad, famous Berber warrior
- Yusuf ibn Tashfin, famous Berber warrior and leader
- Estevanico, famous explorer

== Islamic religious leaders ==
- Ahmad ibn Ajiba, 18th century Sufi saint
- Muhammad al-Jazuli, 15th century Sufi leader of the Berber tribe of the Jazulah
- Sidi Ahmed al-Tidjani, 18th century Sufi scholar, founder of the Tijaniyya Sufi order
- Ahmad al-Ghumari, traditionalist and scholar of Hadith
- Abdullah al-Ghumari, 20th century Muslim preacher, jurist and theologian
- Abd al-Aziz al-Ghumari, 20th century Muslim scholar
- Mohammed Moussaoui, Moroccan-born French Islamic theologist, president of the French Council of Muslim Faith
- Muhammad Abu Khubza, Muslim theologian, jurist, bibliographer and linguist
- Sidi Heddi, 13th century marabout

== Jewish religious leaders ==
- Solomon Abudarham
- Baruch Abuhassira
- Yaakov Abuhassira
- Israel Abuhassira, known as Baba Sali
- Amram Aburbeh
- Zechariah Aghmati
- Samuel Albas
- Isaac Alfassi, 11th-century Rabbi, Talmudist and posek
- Shlomo Amar, Sephardic Chief Rabbi of Jerusalem
- Raphael Ankawa
- Shalom Arush, Moroccan-born Israeli Breslov rabbi and founder of the Chut Shel Chessed Institutions
- Abraham Azulai
- Raphael Isaiah Azulai (1743–1830), rabbi and Jewish scholar in Ancona, Italy
- Elijah Benamozegh (1822–1900), Italian rabbi and Kabbalist, considered as one of Italy's most eminent Jewish scholars
- Amram ben Diwan
- David Ben Hassin
- Dunash ben Labrat
- David ben Shimon
- Isaac Ben Walid (1777–1870), one of the greatest Moroccan rabbi
- Raphael Berdugo
- Salomon Berdugo
- Yehuda Bibas
- Shalom Buzaglo
- Kotel Dadon
- Makhlouf Eldaoudi, Hakham Bashi of the Jewish communities of Acre, Haifa, Safed and Tiberias (1889–1909).
- Yisroel Meir Gabbai
- Baruch Gigi, Moroccan-born Israeli rabbi and co-Rosh yeshiva of Yeshivat Har Etzion in Gush Etzion, south of Jerusalem.
- Shimon Hakham (1843–1910), Bukharian rabbi, descendant of Yosef Maimon
- Haim Ibn Attar
- Issachar ben Mordecai ibn Susan
- Abraham ibn Zimra
- Jacob ben Reuben ibn Zur
- Yaakov Israel Ifargan
- Zion Levy
- Yosef Maimon (1741–1822), Moroccan rabbi who took care of the Bukharian Jewish community in the late 18th, early 19th century.
- David Messas
- Chalom Messas
- Haim Pinto
- Yosef Yitzhak Shloush
- David Rebibo, Moroccan-born American Rabbi
- Yoshiyahu Yosef Pinto, Israeli Orthodox rabbi who leads a global organization called Mosdot Shuva Israel

== Media (journalist, TV presenter, radio) ==
- Laïla Abid, Dutch-Moroccan journalist, presenter and news anchor
- Esmaa Alariachi, Hajar Alariachi and Jihad Alariachi, Dutch-Moroccan presenters
- Arthur (born Jacques Essebag), Moroccan-born French TV presenter, producer and comedian
- Tristane Banon, French journalist and writer
- Valérie Bénaïm, Moroccan-born French journalist, columnist, writer, TV presenter and radio host
- Abdelkader Benali, Dutch-Moroccan writer and journalist
- Robert Benayoun (1926–1996), Moroccan-born French film critic and author.
- Ahmed Benchemsi
- Sonia Benezra, Canadian TV and radio personality and actress
- Ralph Benmergui, Moroccan-Canadian television and radio personality
- Mohammed Benzakour, Dutch-Moroccan columnist, essayist, poet, politician and writer
- Hassnae Bouazza, Dutch-Moroccan journalist, columnist, writer, translator, TV program maker
- Karim Boukhari
- Abdellah Dami, Dutch-Moroccan presenter, journalist, writer
- Gilberto Dimenstein, Brazilian journalist (Moroccan mother)
- Naima El Bezaz, Dutch-Moroccan writer, essayist, and journalist
- Dudu Elharrar, Moroccan-born Israeli singer, music producer, actor and television and radio presenter.
- Ruth Elkrief, French television journalist
- Nassima el Hor, Moroccan television presenter
- Salim Jay
- Najat Kaanache, Spanish cook and host of AMC Networks' cooking series Cocina Marroqui
- Driss Ksikes
- Liran Kohner-Geyor, Israeli model, actress and TV personality.
- Ali Lmrabet
- Omar Nasiri
- James Poniewozik, American journalist, and television critic (Moroccan mother)
- Ariel Wizman, French-Moroccan journalist, television personality, musician, DJ
- Richard Wolffe, British journalist
- Michaël Youn (Michaël Benayoun), French TV and radio personality, actor, singer, and comedian

== Miscellaneous arts (other than music and cinema) ==
- Albert Almoznino, Moroccan-born Israeli hand shadow artist.
- Rachid Ben Ali
- Ilyas El Maliki, Moroccan online streamer
- Mahi Binebine
- Chaïbia
- Pinchas Cohen Gan, Moroccan-born Israeli award-winning painter and mixed-media artist.
- Noureddine Daifallah
- Abdellah Derkaoui, cartoonist
- Latifa Echakhch, French-Moroccan visual artist
- Bouchta El Hayani
- Mohamed Hamri
- Ikram Kabbaj, Moroccan sculptor
- Bouchra Khalili
- Édouard Lock, Canadian dance choreographer and the founder of the Canadian dance group, La La La Human Steps
- Radia Bent Lhoucine, Moroccan painter
- Shuli Nachshon
- Kanza Omar, dancer
- Alberto Pinto, Moroccan-born French photographer and interior designer
- Pokimane (born Imane Anys), Moroccan-Canadian Twitch streamer and YouTube personality
- Salah (dancer), French award-winning competitive hip-hop dancer
- Daniel Siboni, Moroccan-born French photographer
- Cyril Takayama, Japanese Illusionist
- Abdelilah Ennassef, conceptual artist

== Musicians ==
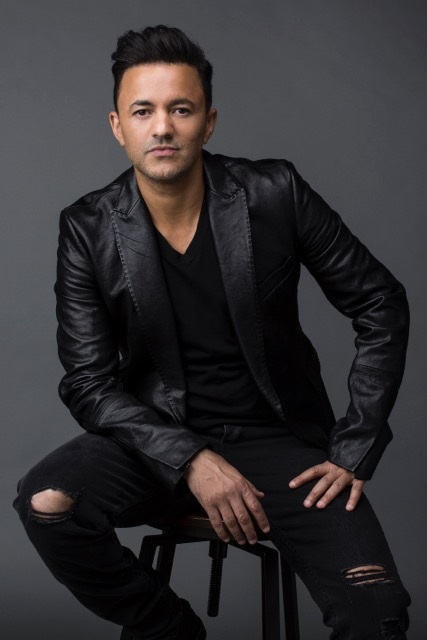
RedOne

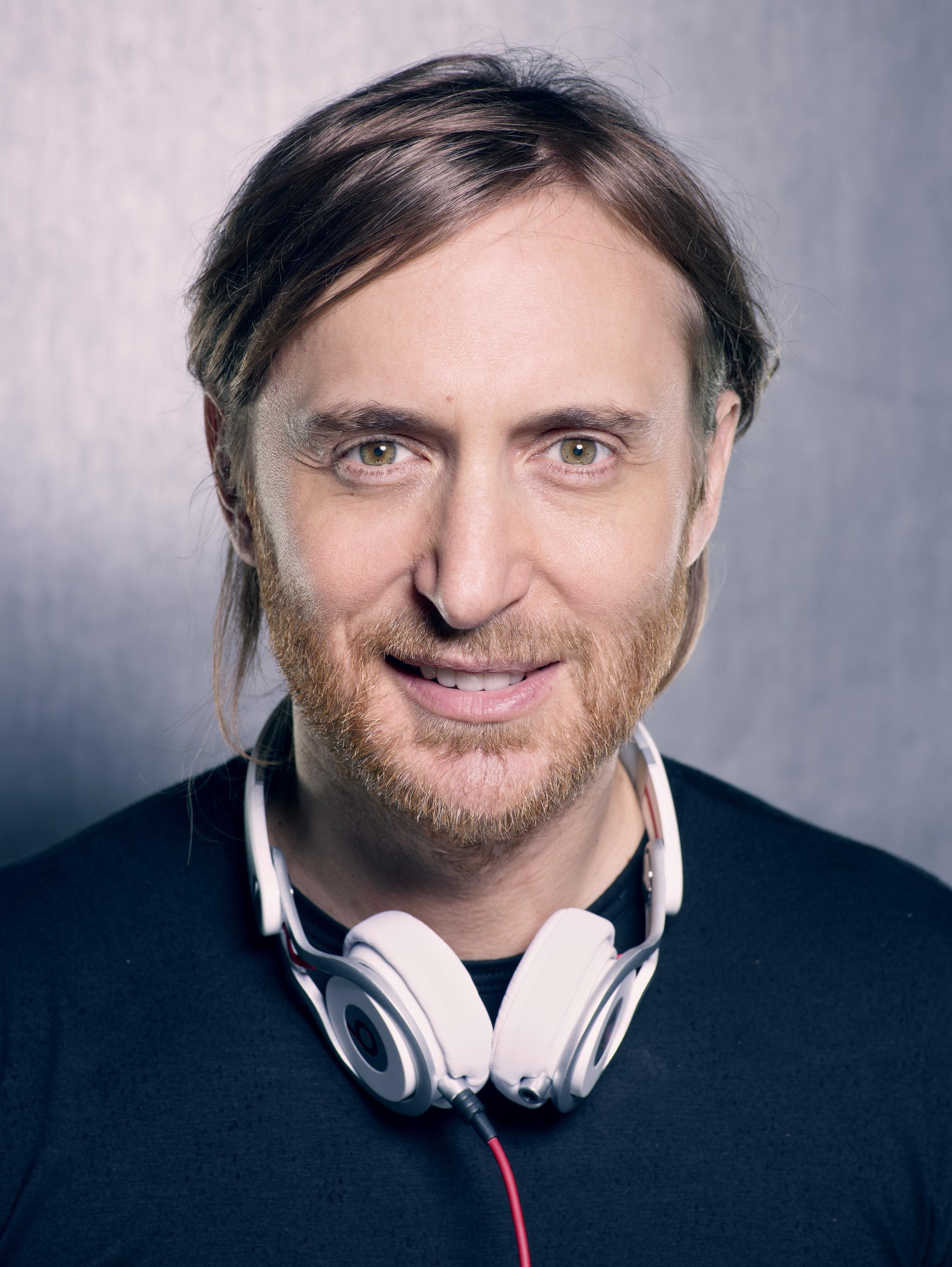
David Guetta

- Armand Amar, French composer
- Omer Avital, Israeli musician
- Shlomo Bar, Israeli musician and singer of Mizrahi music
- Henri Belolo, Moroccan-born French music producer active during the disco era
- French Montana, Moroccan-born American musician
- Faouzia, Moroccan-born Canadian musician
- La Zarra, Canadian-Moroccan singer
- Ohad Benchetrit, Canadian musician
- Chico Bouchikhi (Jalloul Bouchikhi), French musician and a co-founder of the Gipsy Kings
- Avraham Eilam-Amzallag, Israeli musician
- David Guetta, French DJ
- Mahmoud Guinia, Gnawa music maâlem
- Hassan Hakmoun, Los Angeles-based Moroccan Gnawa musician
- Abdelkrim Rais (1912–1996), Moroccan writer and musician of traditional Andalusian music
- Alain Macklovitch, Canadian DJ
- Maurice Ohana, French composer
- RedOne (Nadir Khayat), Moroccan-Swedish record producer/songwriter
- Aziz Sahmaoui, Moroccan musician and vocalist specialized in the modern Gnawa music
- Adil Takhssait, Canadian rap and hip hop musician
- Adam Zindani

== Singers ==
=== Moroccan Arabic/Berber music (traditional, folk) ===
- Najat Aatabou, Moroccan singer
- Bouchaib Abdelhadi, American-Moroccan singer
- Meryem Aboulouafa, Moroccan singer
- Zainab Afailal, Moroccan singer of Andalusian music
- Zohra Al Fassiya (Zohra Ben Hamou, 1905–1994), Moroccan classical singer of Malhoun music
- Yosef "Jo" Amar (1930–2009), Moroccan-born Israeli singer of Mizrahi music
- Mohamed Bajeddoub, acclaimed Moroccan artist of the traditional Andalusian music
- Laarbi Batma (1948–1998), Moroccan singer, leader of Nass El Ghiwane
- Habib Belk (Habib Belkziz), Moroccan gnawa singer-songwriter, and multi-instrumentalist
- Mohamed Benomar Ziani, Moroccan singer and musician specialized in the Aita and Chaabi music
- Raquel Bitton, French Singer
- Saïda Charaf, Moroccan singer of Sahrawi music
- Abdessadeq Cheqara (1931–1998), Moroccan musician and Andalusi singer
- Abdelwahab Doukkali, singer-songwriter and composer
- Haja El Hamdaouia, Moroccan folk singer
- Rhoum El Bakkali, Moroccan Sufi singer and musician, leader of Hadra Chefchaounia, an all-female Sufi musical group
- Mohamed El Hayani (1945–1996), Moroccan singer
- Samy Elmaghribi (Salomon Amzallag, 1922–2008), Moroccan singer-songwriter and musician
- Jedwan (El Mokhtar Jedouane), Moroccan singer of chaabi music
- Nabyla Maan, Moroccan singer
- Younes Megri, Moroccan singer, musician and actor
- Reinette L'Oranaise (Sultana Daoud), Algerian singer of Arab-Andalusian music
- Oum (Oum El Ghaït Bent el Sahraoui), Moroccan singer-songwriter
- Avi Peretz (singer), Israeli singer of Moroccan music
- Mohamed Rouicha (1950–2012), Moroccan folk singer
- Naima Samih, Moroccan singer, one of Morocco's most acclaimed singer
- Mohammed El-Arabi Serghini, Moroccan classical singer and musician
- Houcine Slaoui (Houcine Ben Bouchaïb, 1921–1951), Moroccan singer and composer

=== Moroccan music ===
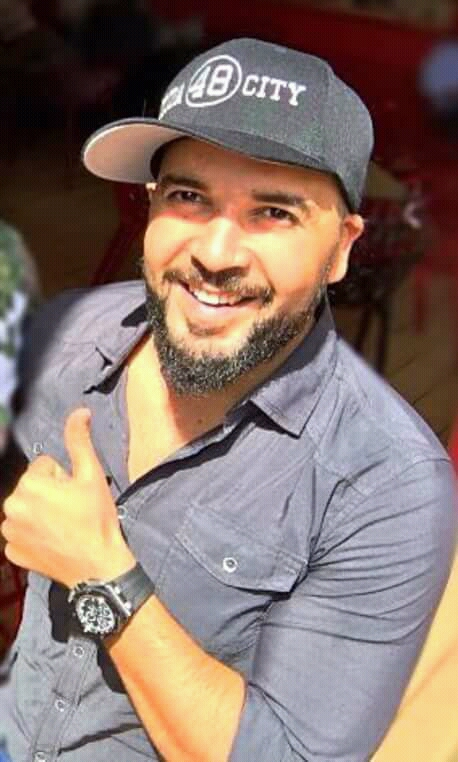
Douzi

- AnoGhan (Anouar EL Ghannam), Moroccan singer-songwriter
- OUBEL (Oussama Belhcen), Moroccan singer
- Hamid Bouchnak, Moroccan singer
- Karima Gouit, Moroccan singer, model and actress
- Ahmed Chawki, Moroccan pop singer
- Cheba Maria (Maria Zine), Moroccan singer of pop music
- Cheb Kader (Kouider Morabet), Algerian-born Moroccan singer
- Douzi (Abdelhafid Douzi), Moroccan singer
- Boussouar El Maghnaoui
- Mimoun El Oujdi (Mimoun Bakoush, 1950–2018), Moroccan singer of Raï music
- Saida Fikri, Moroccan-born American singer of Moroccan music
- Saad Lamjarred, Moroccan singer of Arabic pop music
- Manal (Manal Benchlikha), Moroccan singer of Rap and Hip Hop music
- Ahmed Soultan, Moroccan singer of Afro-Arabian Soul
- Vigon (Mohsine Abdelghafour), Moroccan singer-songwriter, record producer, dancer and bandleader
- Hindi Zahra, French-Moroccan singer

=== Moroccan Amazigh music ===
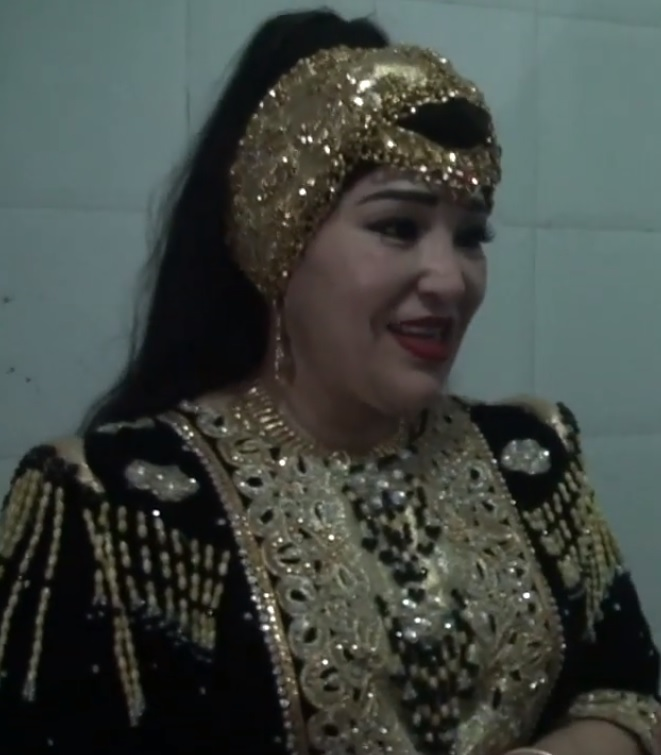
Aicha Tachinwit

- Hassan Arsmouk, Moroccan singer of Amazigh (Tashelhit) music
- Rkia Damsiria, Moroccan singer of Tashelhit music
- Khalid Izri (Khalid Yachou), Moroccan singer of Amazigh (Riffian) music
- Ammouri M'barek (1951–2015), Moroccan singer of Amazigh (Tashelhit) music
- Fatima Tabaamrant, Moroccan singer of Amazigh (Tashelhit) music
- Aicha Tachinwit, Moroccan singer of Amazigh (Tashelhit) music
- Fatima Tihihit (Fatima Banou), Moroccan singer of Tashelhit music
- Salima Ziani, Moroccan singer of Riffian music and activist

=== Arabic music (Tarab, Middle-East Arabic pop) ===
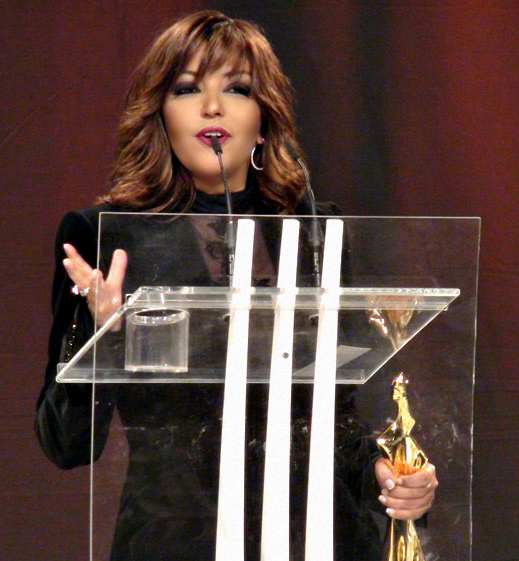
Samira Said

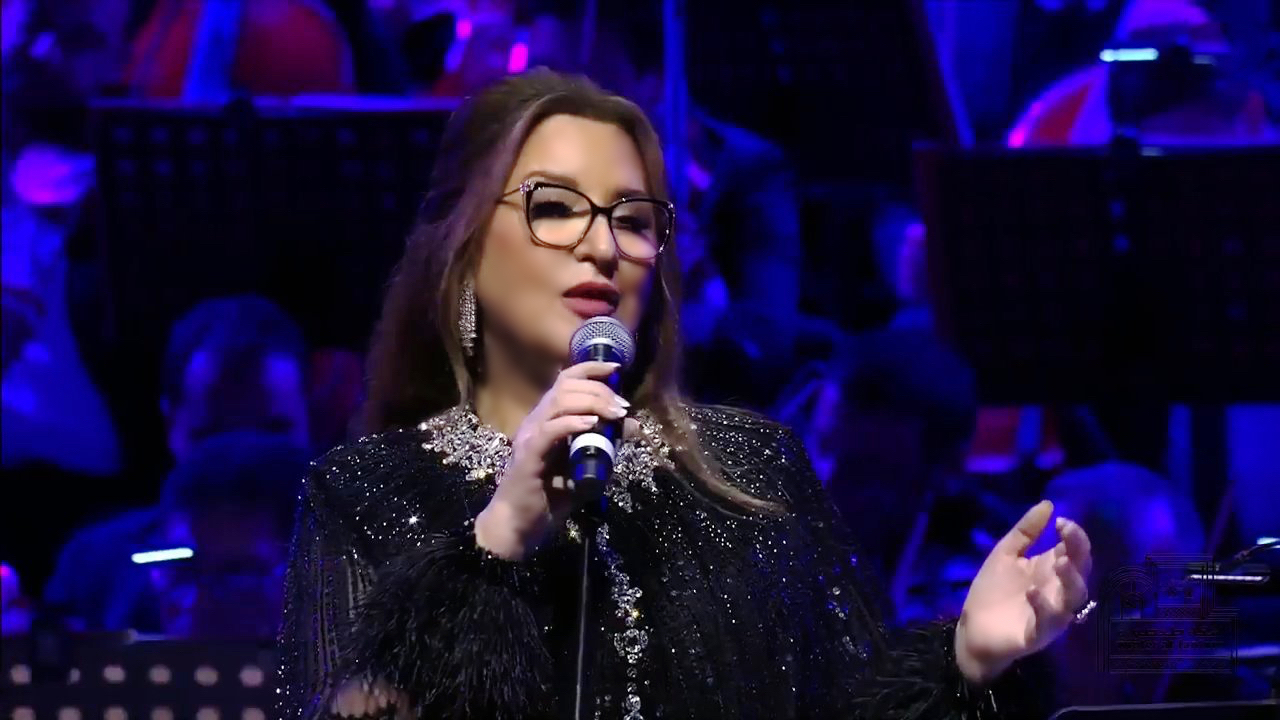
Aziza Jalal

- Dounia Batma, Moroccan singer of Arabic pop music
- Rajae Belmlih (1962–2007), Moroccan singer of Arabic pop music
- Abdou Cherif, Moroccan singer
- Dystinct, Belgian-Moroccan singer
- Sofia El Marikh, Moroccan singer
- Laila Ghofran (Jamila Omar Bouamrout), Moroccan singer of Arabic pop music
- Shatha Hassoun, Iraqi-Moroccan singer of Arabic pop music
- Aziza Jalal, Moroccan singer
- Rajaa Kasabni, Arabic singer, winner of the first season of the Arabic version of The X-Factor
- Asma Lamnawar, Moroccan singer of Arabic pop music
- Jannat (Jannat Mahid), Moroccan singer of Arabic pop music
- Salma Rachid, Moroccan pop singer
- Hoda Saad, Moroccan singer-songwriter and composer of Arabic pop music
- Samira Said, Moroccan-Egyptian singer of Arabic pop music
- Yousra Saouf, Moroccan pop singer
- Ibtissam Tiskat, Moroccan pop singer

=== Rap (Moroccan, French or international) ===
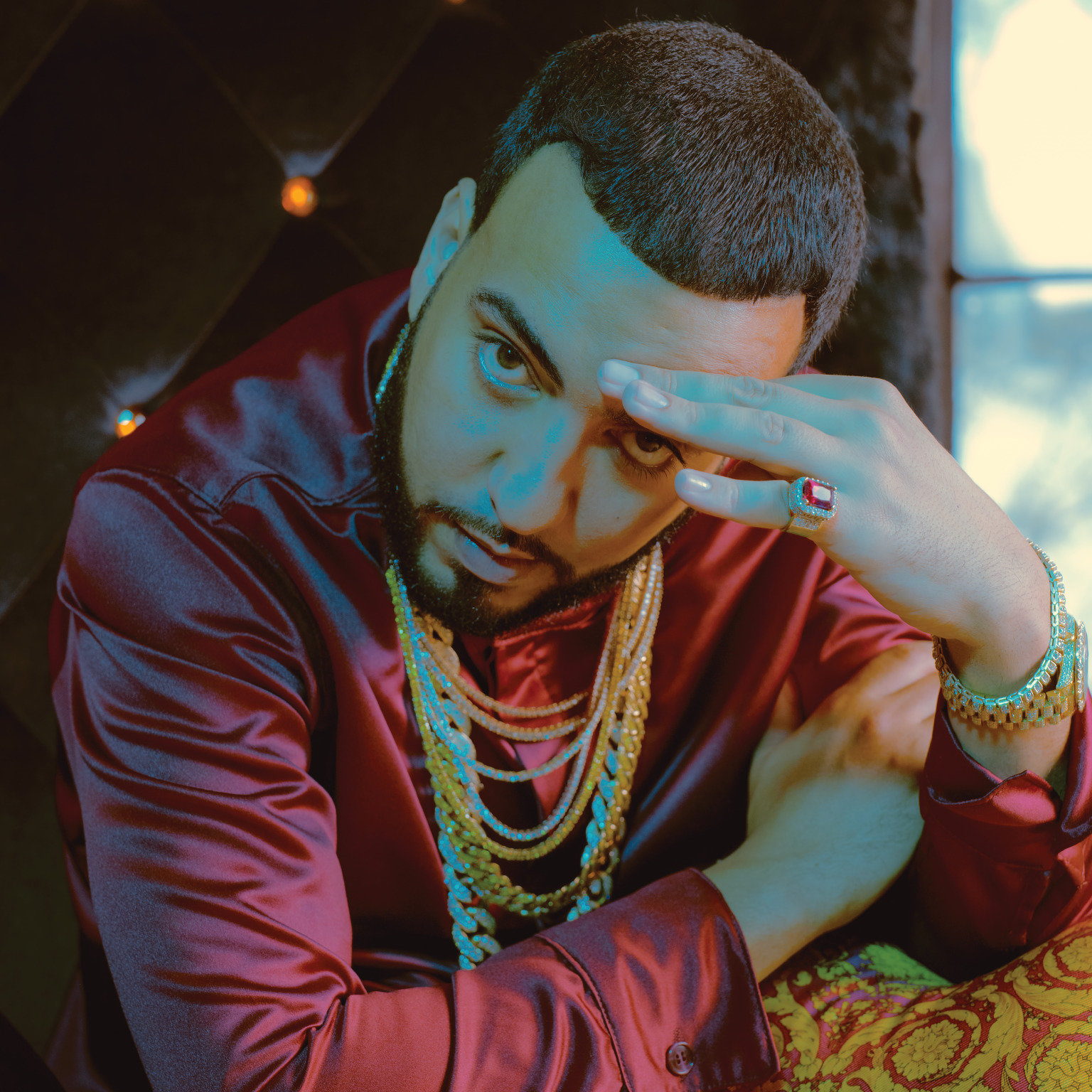
French Montana

- French Montana (Karim Kharbouch), Moroccan-American rapper
- Appa (Rachid El Ghazoui), Dutch-Moroccan rapper
- Ali B (Ali Bouali), Dutch rapper and stand-up comedian
- Isam Bachiri, Danish rapper and member of Outlandish
- Farid Bang, born Farid El Abdellaoui, Spanish-born German rapper, songwriter, producer, CEO at Banger Musik Label
- Canardo (Hakim Mouhid), French rapper
- Cilvaringz (Tarik Azzougarh), Dutch rapper and hip hop producer associated with the Wu-Tang Clan
- Dizzy DROS, rapper from Casablanca
- Elgrandetoto, Moroccan rapper
- DJ Izm (Tarik Ejjamai), Australian rapper, member of the Multi-Platinum ARIA Award-winning Australian hip hop band Bliss n Eso
- Leila K (Laila El Khalifi), Swedish Eurodance singer and former rapper
- La Fouine (Laouni Mouhid), Moroccan-French rapper
- H-Kayne, Moroccan rap group

=== Jewish music ===
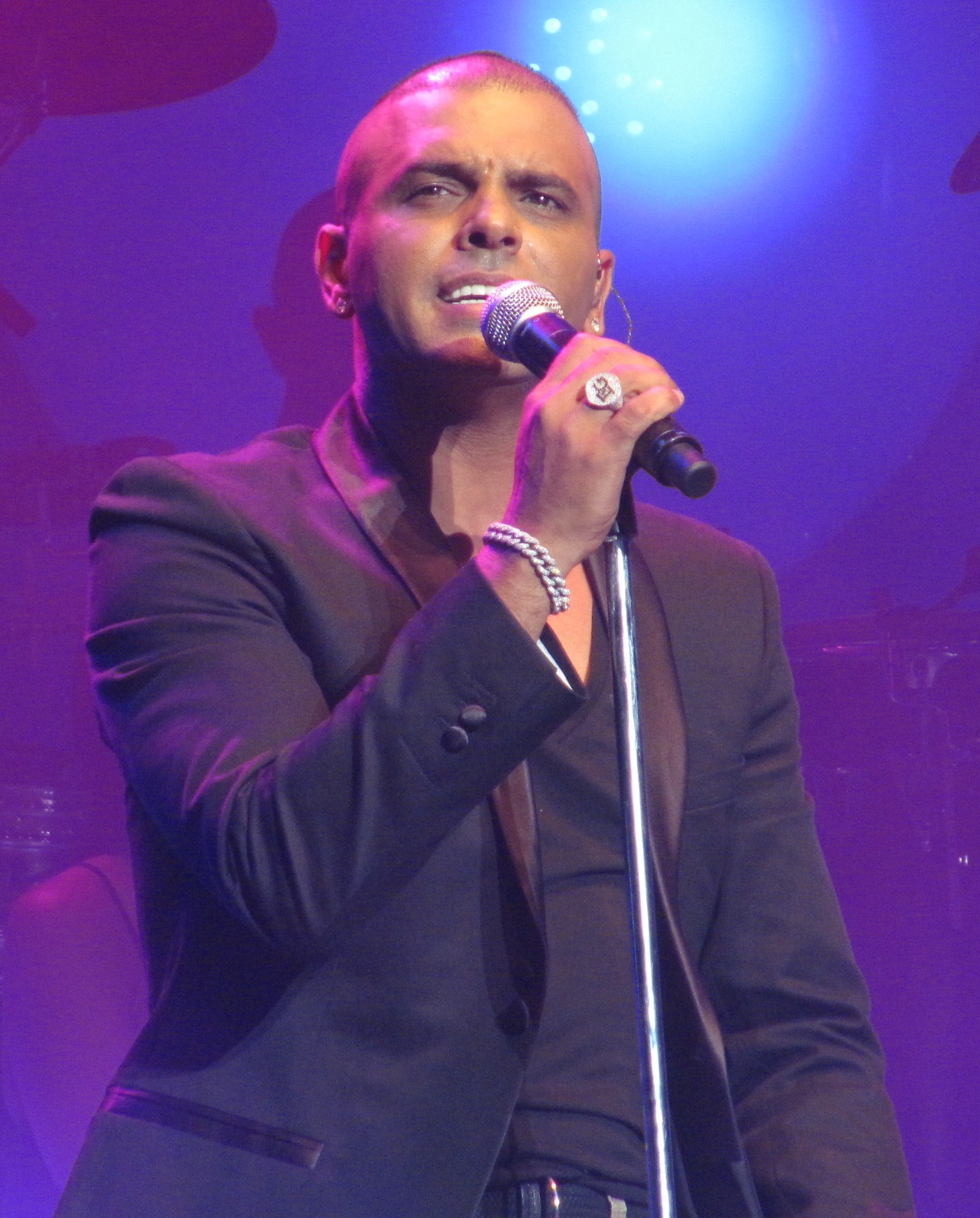
Eyal Golan

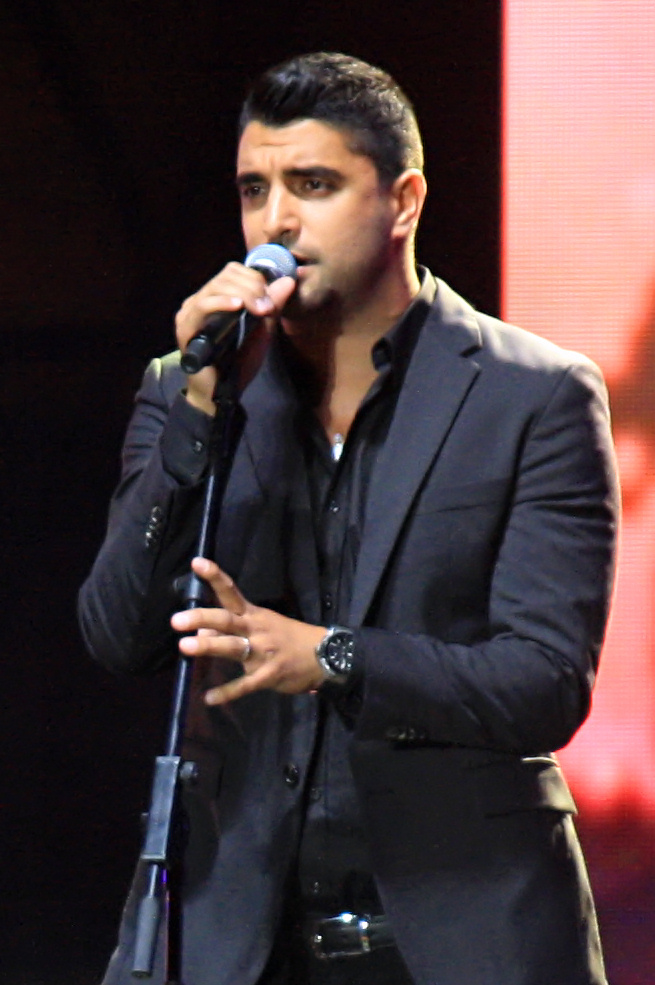
Moshe Peretz

- Zehava Ben, Israeli singer of Mizrahi music
- Ofir Ben Shitrit, Israeli singer
- Eden Ben Zaken, Israeli singer
- Maya Bouskilla, Israeli pop singer
- Yosefa Dahari, Israeli singer of Mizrahi music
- Yuval Dayan, Israeli singer of pop music
- Alon De Loco (Alon Cohen), Israeli singer and music producer
- Gad Elbaz, Israeli singer of Sephardic Jewish music
- Esther Galil, Moroccan-born French-Israeli singer
- Eyal Golan, Israeli singer of Mizrahi music
- Ishtar (Esther Eti Bitton), Israeli singer of Mizrahi and Arabic pop music
- Mor Karbasi, Israeli singer of Sephardic music
- Kineret (Kineret Sarah Cohen), Israeli-American singer of Jewish music
- Noa Kirel, Israeli pop singer
- Daniella Lugassy, Israeli opera singer
- Shiri Maimon, Israeli pop singer
- Harel Moyal, Israeli pop singer
- Netta Barzilai, Israeli singer, winner of the 2018 Eurovision contest
- Kobi Peretz, Israeli singer of Mizrahi and pop music
- Moshe Peretz, Israeli singer of Mizrahi and pop music
- Kathleen Reiter, Canadian-Israeli pop singer, winner of the first season of The Voice Israel
- Ninet Tayeb, Israeli singer and actress
- Avi Toledano, Israeli singer of Mizrahi music
- Haim Ulliel, Israeli singer of Mizrahi music

=== Western music ===
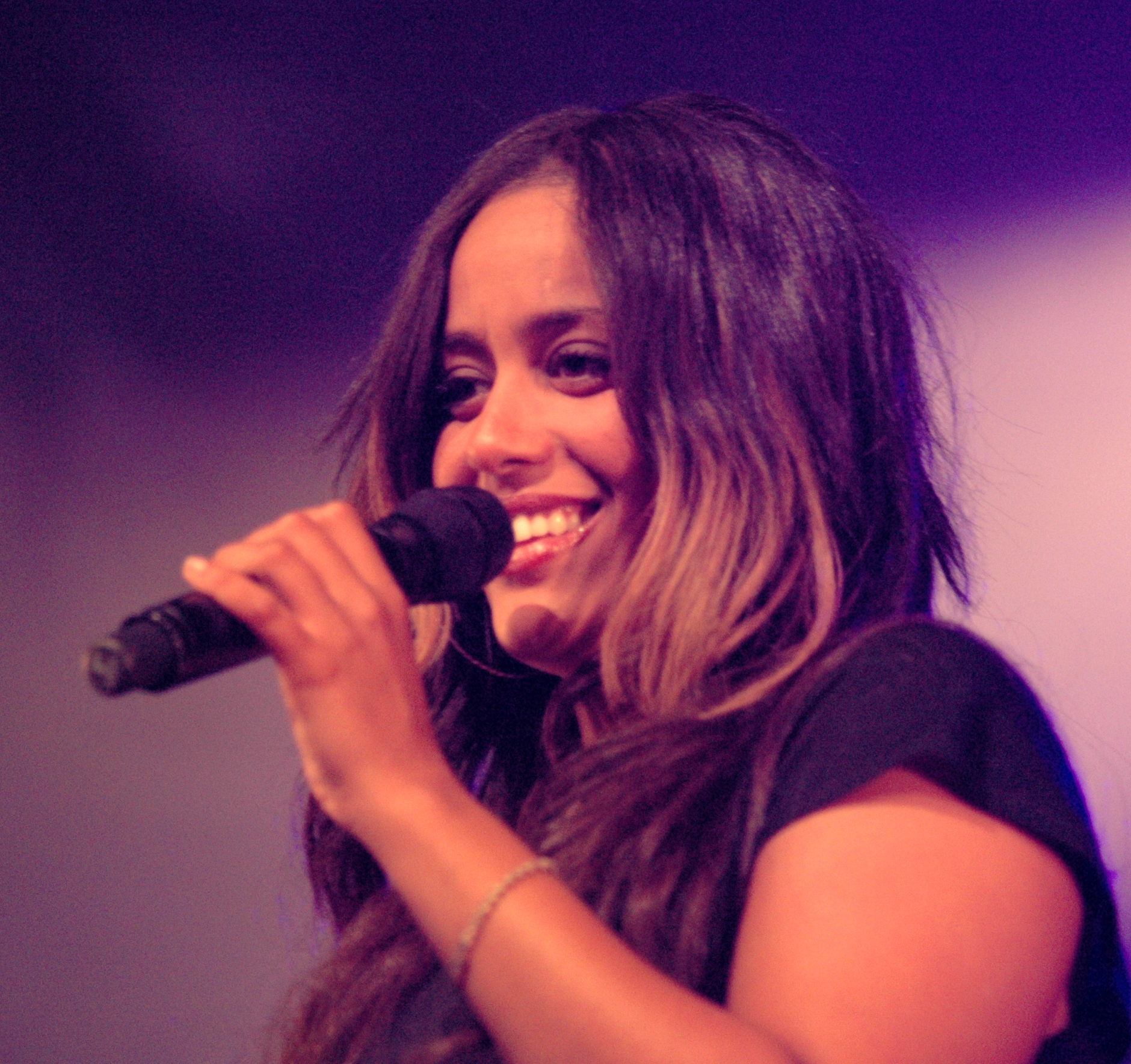
Amel Bent

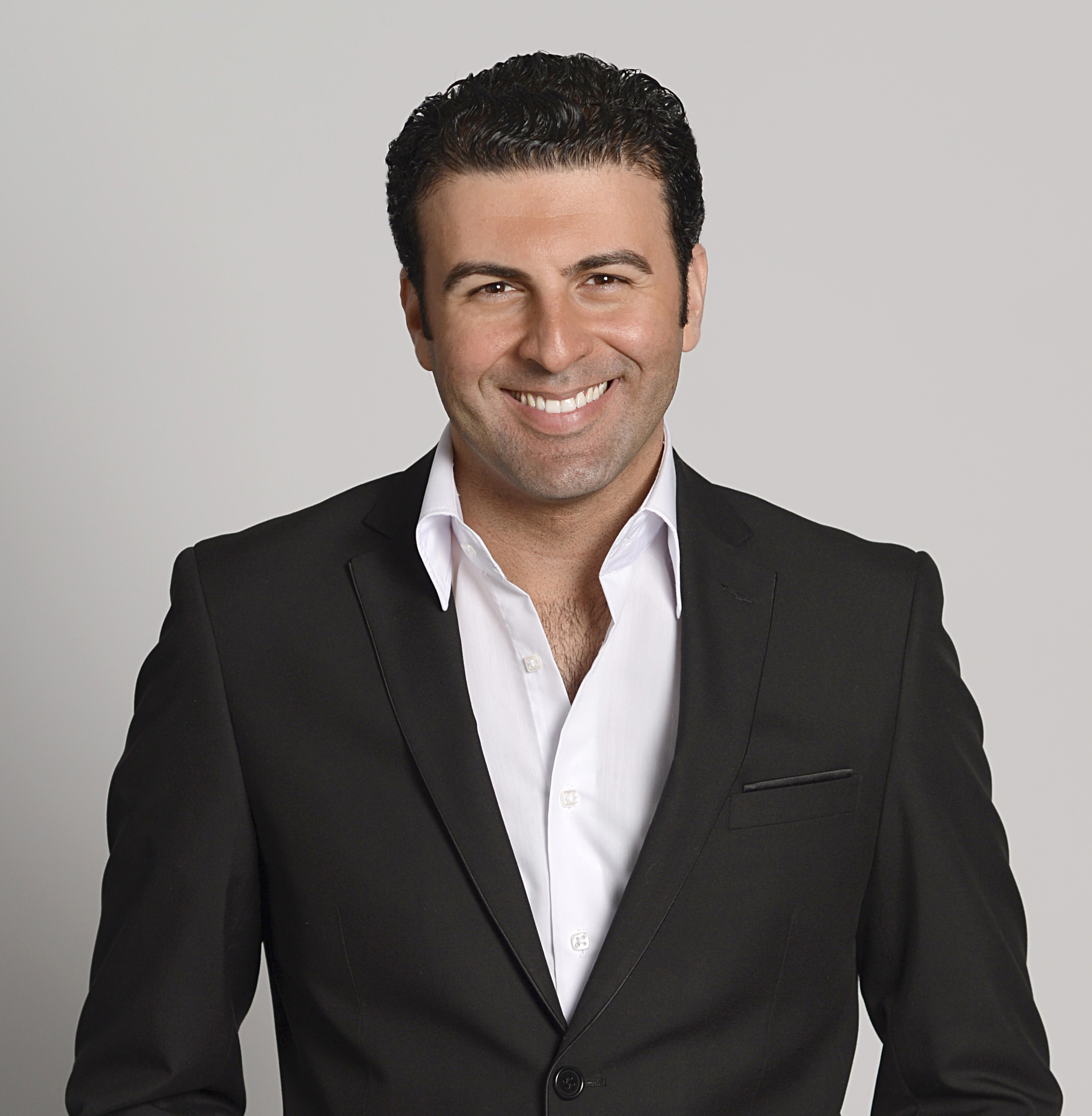
David Serero

- Zak Abel, British singer
- Amine (Amine Mounder), French-Moroccan R&B singer
- La Zarra, Canadian singer
- Malika Ayane, Italian singer
- Basim, Danish singer (Danish Representative In Eurovision Song Contest 2014)
- Madison Beer, American pop singer and model
- Nej', French singer
- Najoua Belyzel, French pop rock/electronic singer
- Nadja Benaissa, singer-songwriter and actress, member of No Angels
- Amel Bent, French pop singer
- Amelle Berrabah, British singer and member of girl band Sugababes
- Isaac Bitton, drummer for Les Variations
- Raquel Bitton, French-Moroccan singer
- Soukaina Boukries, Moroccan pop singer
- Cut Killer (Anouar Hajoui), French DJ, actor and hip-hop recording artist
- Younes Elamine, Moroccan-born French singer-songwriter, music producer and entrepreneur
- Rajae El Mouhandiz, singer, poet and producer
- Empire I (Miriam Moufide), Jamaica-based British singer-songwriter and social activist
- Sofia Essaïdi, French-Moroccan singer
- Nadia Essadiqi, Canadian singer
- Faouzia (Faouzia Ouihya), Moroccan-born Canadian singer
- Fouradi (Mohamed and Brahim Fouradi), Dutch hip hop duo
- Senna Gammour, German singer-songwriter and a member of the pop group Monrose
- Amir Haddad, French-Israeli singer of pop music
- Raphaël Haroche, French singer-songwriter and actor
- Bilal Hassani, French singer
- Elam Jay, Moroccan Swiss singer-songwriter
- Sofia Karlberg, Swedish singer
- Imad Kotbi, DJ and radio presenter
- La Caution (Ahmed and Mohammed Mazouz), French hip-hop duo
- Hind Laroussi, Dutch singer
- Loreen (Lorine Zineb Nora Talhaoui), Swedish singer (winner of Eurovision Song Contest 2012 and 2023)
- Malek (Malek Belarbi), French-Moroccan singer
- Sofia Mestari, French singer
- Édith Piaf (Édith Gassion), French cultural icon and France's greatest popular singer
- R3hab (Fadil El Ghoul), Dutch-Moroccan DJ/producer
- Sapho (Danielle Ebguy), Moroccan-born French singer
- David Serero, French opera singer
- Chico Slimani (Youssef Slimani), Moroccan British singer
- Sliimy (Yanis Sahraoui), French pop musician
- Wallen (Nawell Azzouz), French R&B singer
- Brigitte Zarie, Canadian singer-songwriter and composer

== Poets ==
- Mohammed Achaari
- Mohammed ibn Mohammed Alami
- Mohammed ibn Idris al-Amrawi
- Muhammad Awzal, religious Berber poet from the 17th century
- Kaddour El Alamy
- Abdellatif Laabi
- David Hassine, religious Jewish poet and Rabbi from the 17th century
- Hemmou Talb, 18th century composer of poems in the Shilha Berber language

== Ministers, politicians and public servants ==
=== Morocco ===
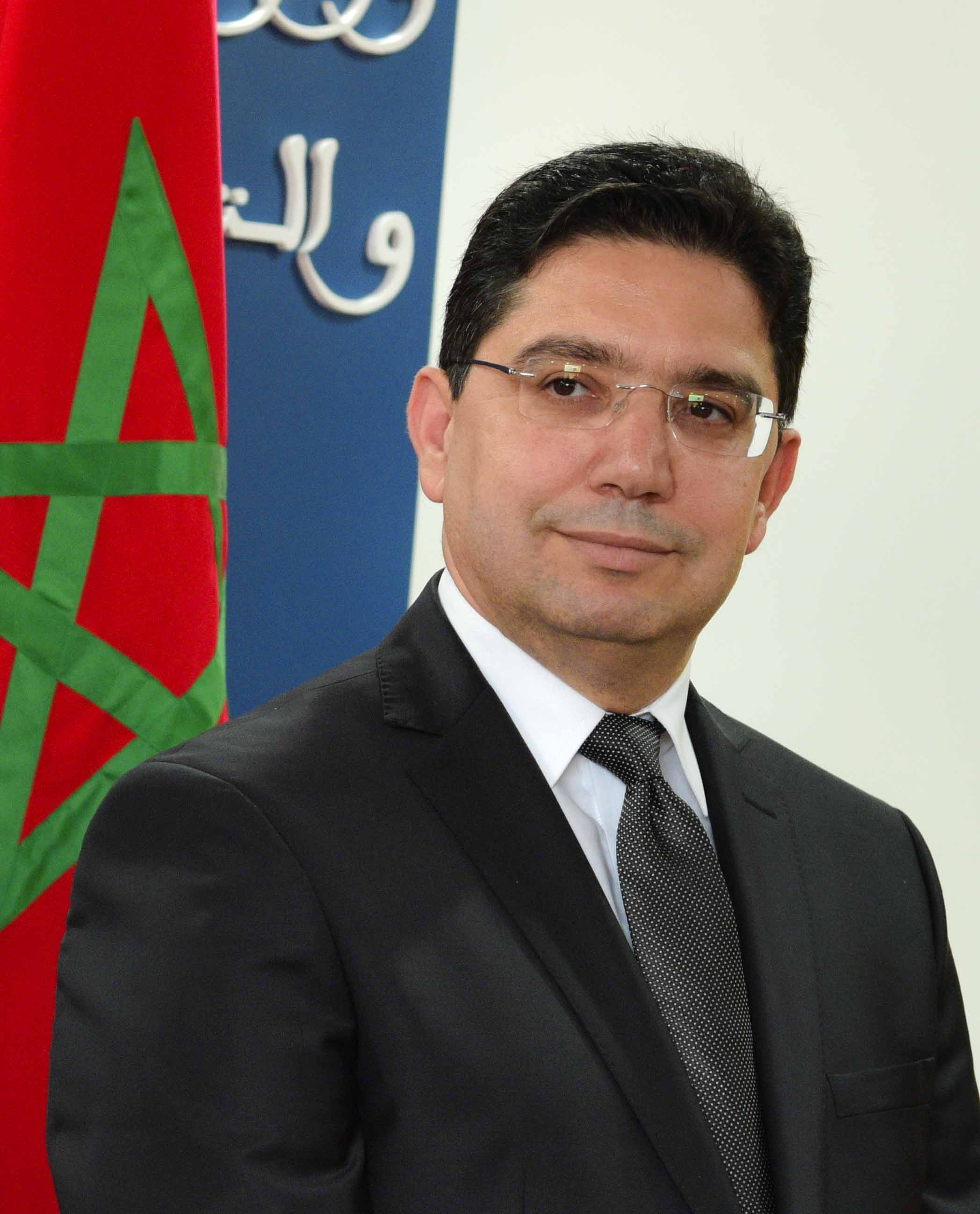
Nasser Bourita

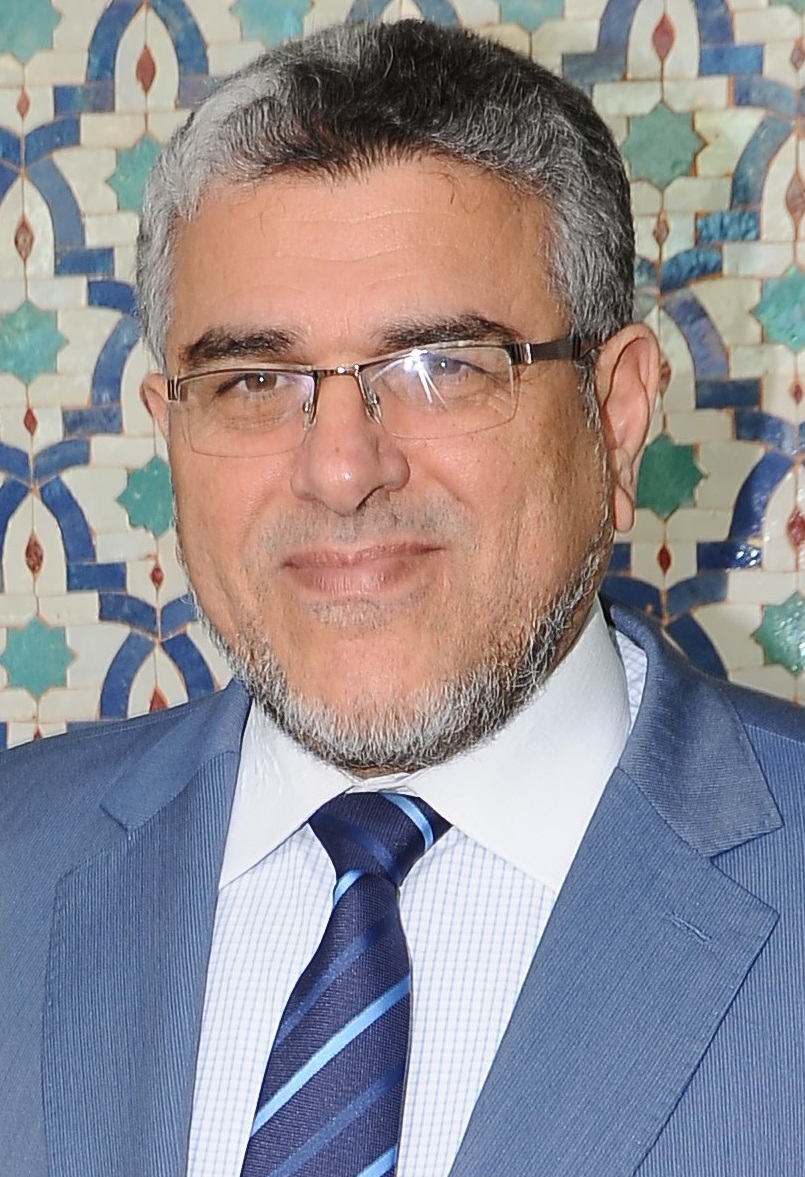
Mustafa Ramid

- M'hammed Abdenabaoui, first president of the Court of Cassation (appointed 2021)
- Idriss Azami Al Idrissi, politician, Minister-Delegate for the Budget (2012–2016)
- Chadi Abdalla, American ambassador for the Kingdom of Morocco, appointed in 2020, being the youngest Ambassador in Africa. He currently works with the Biden Administration.
- André Azoulay, politician, counsellor to late king Hassan II and king Mohammed VI
- Driss Basri, politician who served as Interior Minister from 1979 to 1999
- Aïcha Belarbi, Moroccan sociologist, women's rights activist and diplomat. She was ambassador to the European Union from 2000 to 2008.
- Mohamed Benaissa, foreign minister
- Abdelilah Benkirane, Prime Minister from 2011 to 2017, secretary-general of the Justice and Development Party since 2021
- Aziz Akhannouch, Prime Minister from October 2021 to September 2026, businessman and billionaire
- Fatima Ezzahra El Mansouri, Prime Minister from September 2026, lawyer, and former mayor of Marrakech.
- Mehdi Ben Barka, politician, head of the left-wing National Union of Popular Forces (UNPF) and opponent of Hassan II
- Ahmed Benkirane, ambassador, delegate, and politician; negotiator during the French independence
- Aziza Bennani, Moroccan academic and politician.
- Jamal Benomar, diplomat, who worked at the UN for 25 years, including as a special envoy for Yemen and a special adviser to former Secretary-General Ban Ki-moon.
- Yahya Bennani, diplomat
- Fadel Benyaich, Moroccan-Spanish politician and businessman, ambassador of Morocco in Spain
- Abderrahman Bouftas, businessman, politician, and technocrat, President of the Royal Moroccan Golf Federation
- Leon Benzaquen (1928–1977), Moroccan personal doctor for King Mohammed V of Morocco, and the first Jewish minister after Morocco's independence.
- Rachad Bouhlal, diplomat
- Ahmed Boukhari, former agent of the Moroccan Secret Service
- Asma Chaabi
- Driss Debbagh, former ambassador and minister
- Abdellatif Filali, foreign minister (1985–1989); prime minister (1994–1998)
- Saadeddine Othmani, Prime Minister (2017–2021), Minister of Foreign Affairs (2012–2013)
- Driss Jettou, Prime Minister (2002–2007)
- Omar Kabbaj, diplomat
- Ali Ben Lmadani (born 1982), former Parliament member
- Fatima Marouan (born 1952), politician, endocrinologist
- Mohamed Mediouri, politician, personal security of Hassan II and his senior bodyguard
- Aziz Mekouar, Moroccan diplomat, former Moroccan ambassador to the U.S.
- Abdelaziz Meziane Belfqih, civil servant and senior advisor of king Mohammed VI
- Nasser Bourita, diplomat serving as the Minister of Foreign Affairs, African Cooperation and Moroccan Expatriates since 5 April 2017
- Ahmed Osman, former party leader
- Fathallah Oualalou, government minister
- Abderrahim Qanir
- Abdelkrim Ragoun, former Moroccan diplomat
- Léon Sultan, French Algerian-born Moroccan lawyer, and politician, founder of the Moroccan Communist Party.
- Mahjoub Tobji, retired Commandant of the Royal Moroccan Army
- Abderrahmane Youssoufi, Prime Minister (1998–2002)
- Mustafa Ramid, Minister of Justice and Liberties (2012–2017)

=== Israel ===
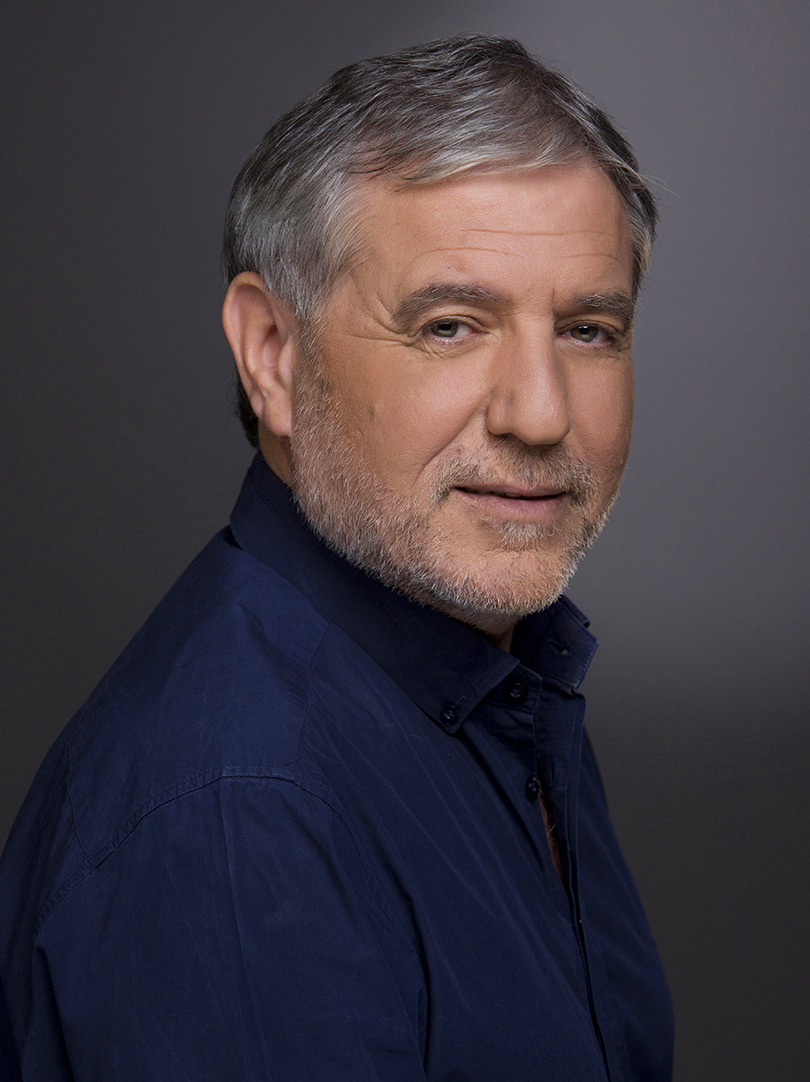
Meir Cohen

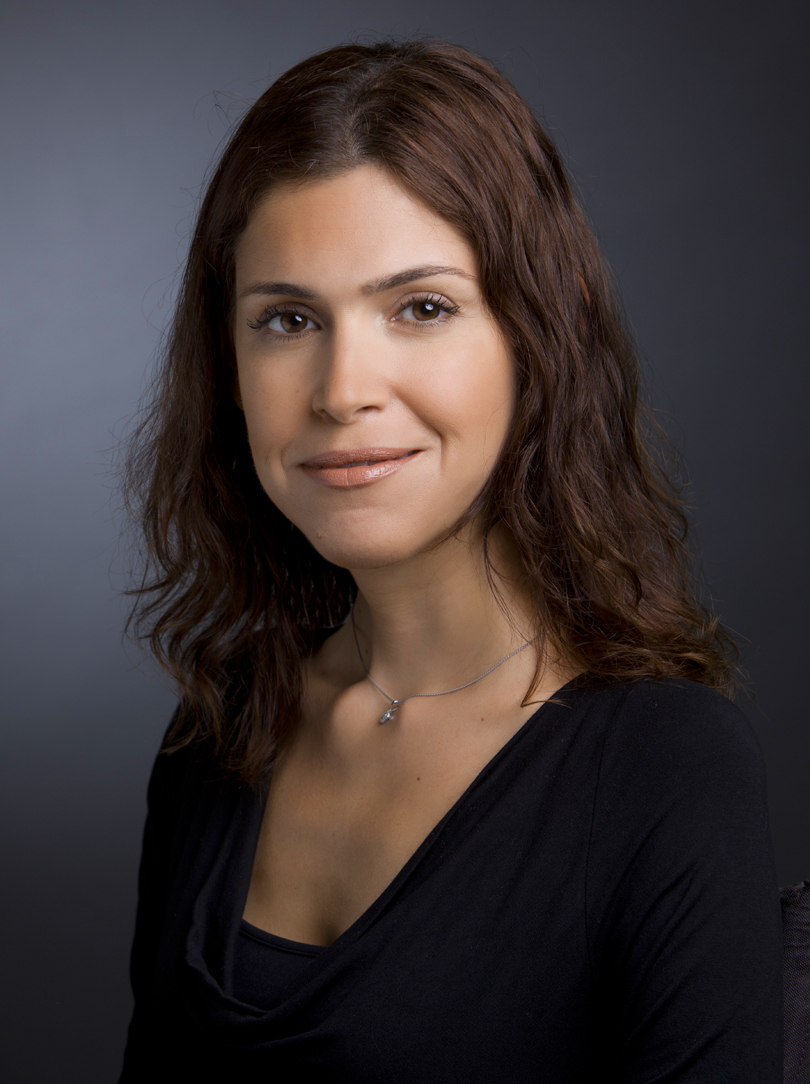
Karin Elharar

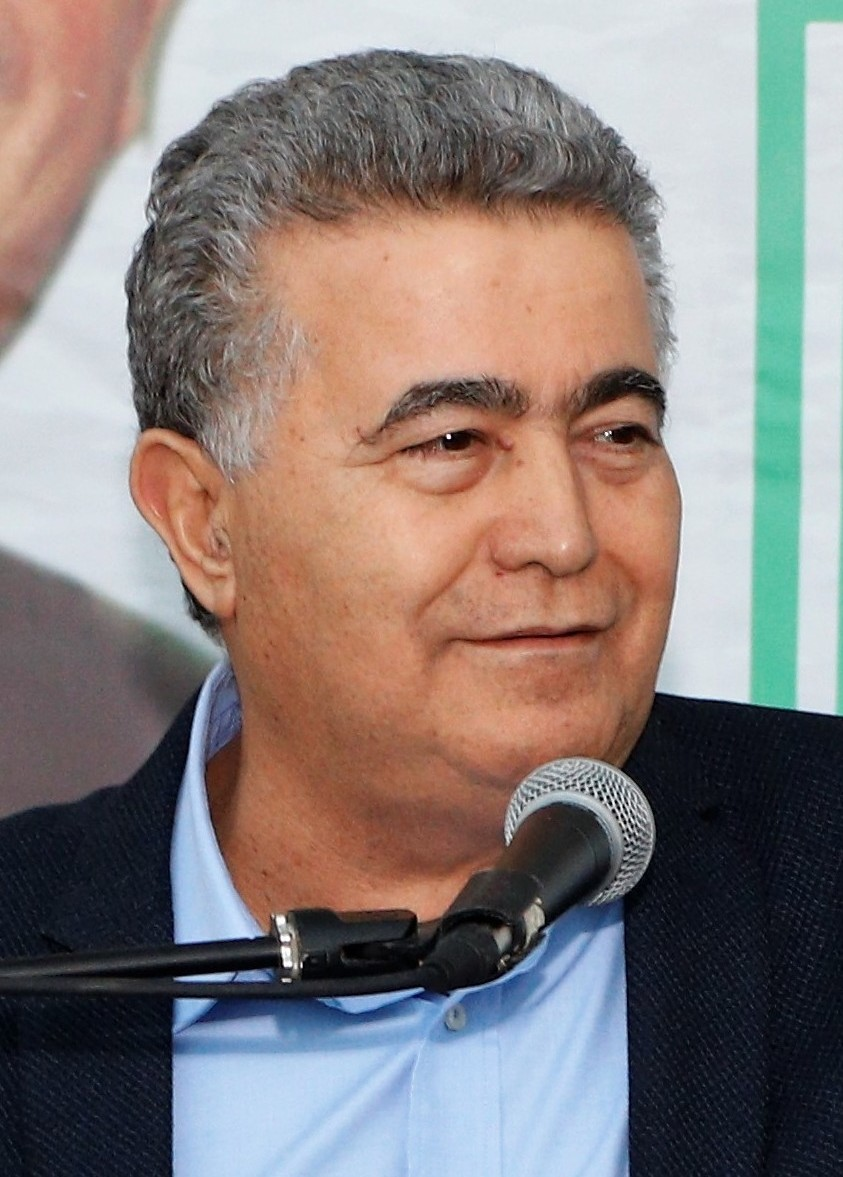
Amir Peretz

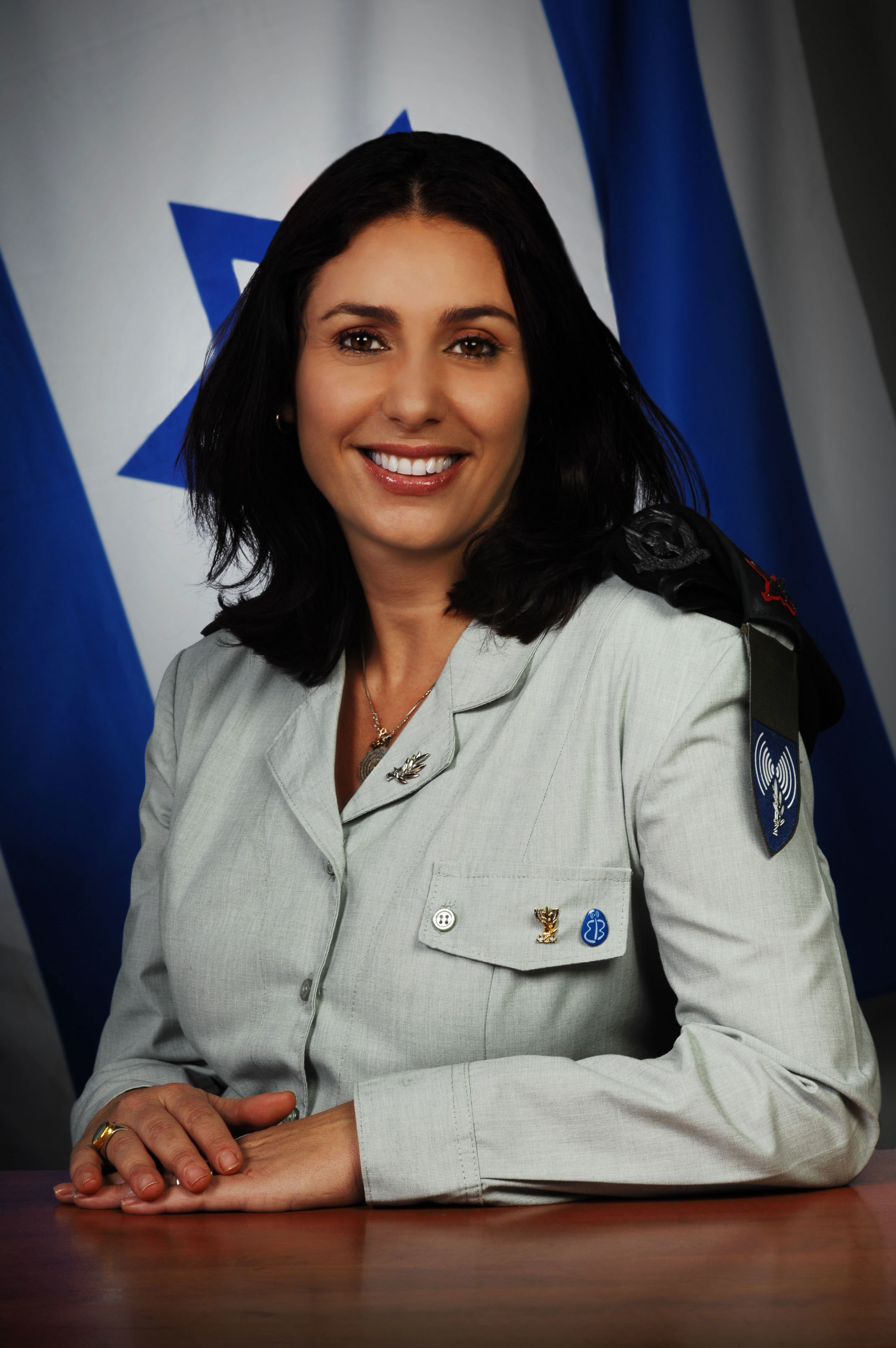
Miri Regev

- Shai Abuhatsira
- Aharon Abuhatzira
- Eli Aflalo, Moroccan-born Israeli politician
- Eli Alaluf, Moroccan-born Israeli politician
- Roni Alsheikh
- Jacques Amir
- Shaul Amor
- David Dudi Amsalem, Israeli politician
- Haim Amsalem, French Algerian-born Israeli politician
- Danny Atar
- Ariel Atias
- Shmuel Avital, Moroccan-born Israeli former politician who served as a minister responsible for social co-ordination from March 2001 to February 2002
- Yosef Azran
- Aryeh Azulai
- David Azulai
- Yinon Azulai, Israeli politician
- Eli Ben-Dahan
- Shlomo Benizri
- Daniel Benlulu, Moroccan-born Israeli former politician
- Daniel Ben-Simon, Moroccan-born Israeli politician
- Ya'akov Ben-Yezri (1927–2018), Moroccan-born Israeli politician. He served as Israel's Minister of Health between 2006 and 2009.
- David Bitan
- Shlomo Bohbot
- Yoni Chetboun
- Meir Cohen
- Yitzhak Cohen
- Meirav Cohen
- Nissim Dahan
- David Danino (1924–1990), Moroccan-born Israeli politician
- Yohanan Danino
- Danny Danon
- Eli Dayan
- Shlomo Dayan
- Aryeh Deri
- Rafael Edri
- Yaakov Edri
- Gadi Eizenkot
- Rafael Eldad, Moroccan-born Israeli diplomat
- Karin Elharar
- Mordechai Elgrably, Moroccan-born Israeli politician
- Rafi Elul
- Leah Fadida, Israeli politician
- Avraham "Avi" Gabbay, Israeli businessman and politician
- Sharren Haskel
- Tzachi Hanegbi
- Fleur Hassan-Nahoum, British-born Israeli politician and public servant
- Asher Hassin
- Avraham Kalfon
- Moshe Karadi
- Yehuda Lancry, Moroccan-born Israeli politician and previous ambassador to France and the United Nations
- Yehiel Lasri, Moroccan-born Israeli physician and politician who currently serves as mayor of Ashdod
- David Levy
- Daniel-Yitzhak Levy, Spanish-Moroccan born Israeli politician
- Jackie Levy
- Maxim Levy
- Orly Levy
- Yitzhak Levy
- David Magen
- Rahamim Malul, Moroccan-born Israeli politician
- Yoram Marciano
- Ya'akov Margi, Moroccan-born Israeli politician
- Eliyahu Moyal (1920–1991), Moroccan-born Israeli politician who served as a member of the Knesset for the Alignment between 1974 and 1981
- Shuli Mualem
- Aharon Nahmias
- Yitzhak Navon
- Amir Ohana
- Asher Ohana
- Shimon Ohayon
- Amir Peretz
- Rafael "Rafi" Peretz, Israeli Orthodox rabbi and politician
- Yair Peretz
- Yitzhak Peretz (politician born 1938)
- Yitzhak Peretz (politician born 1936)
- Zion Pinyan, Moroccan-born Israeli politician
- Elad Ratson, Israeli diplomat and a Digital Diplomacy expert
- Miri Regev (née Miriam Siboni), Israeli politician
- Uri Sebag, Moroccan-born Israeli politician
- Bechor-Shalom Sheetrit
- Yifat Shasha-Biton, Israeli educator and politician. She held the post of Minister of Construction and Housing from 2019 to 2020.
- Meir Sheetrit
- Shimon Shetreet
- Keti Shitrit, Moroccan-born Israeli politician
- Yoel Strick, Israeli General (Aluf) who commands the Ground Forces Command
- Eli Suissa, Moroccan-born Israeli politician
- Rafael Suissa, Moroccan-born Israeli politician
- Avraham Toledano
- Samuel Toledano (1929–1996), Moroccan-born Spanish Jewish community leader
- Shmuel Toledano
- Sami Turgeman (Shlomo "Sami" Turgeman), major general in the IDF and is the current commander of the IDF Southern Command
- Yitzhak Vaknin
- Yosef Vanunu, Moroccan-born Israeli economist and former politician who served as a member of the Knesset from 1992 until 1996
- Yehonatan Yifrah

=== Elsewhere ===
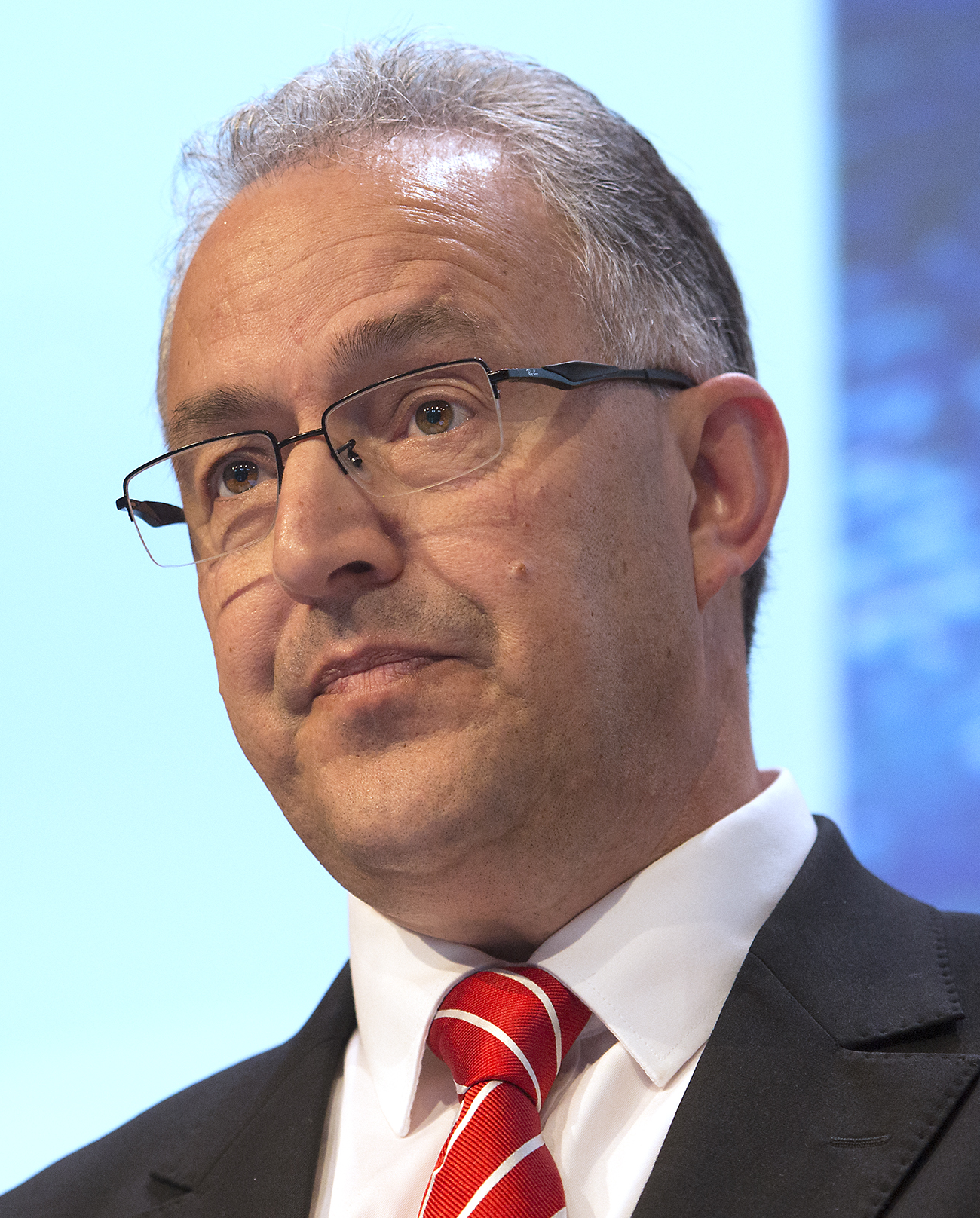
Ahmed Aboutaleb

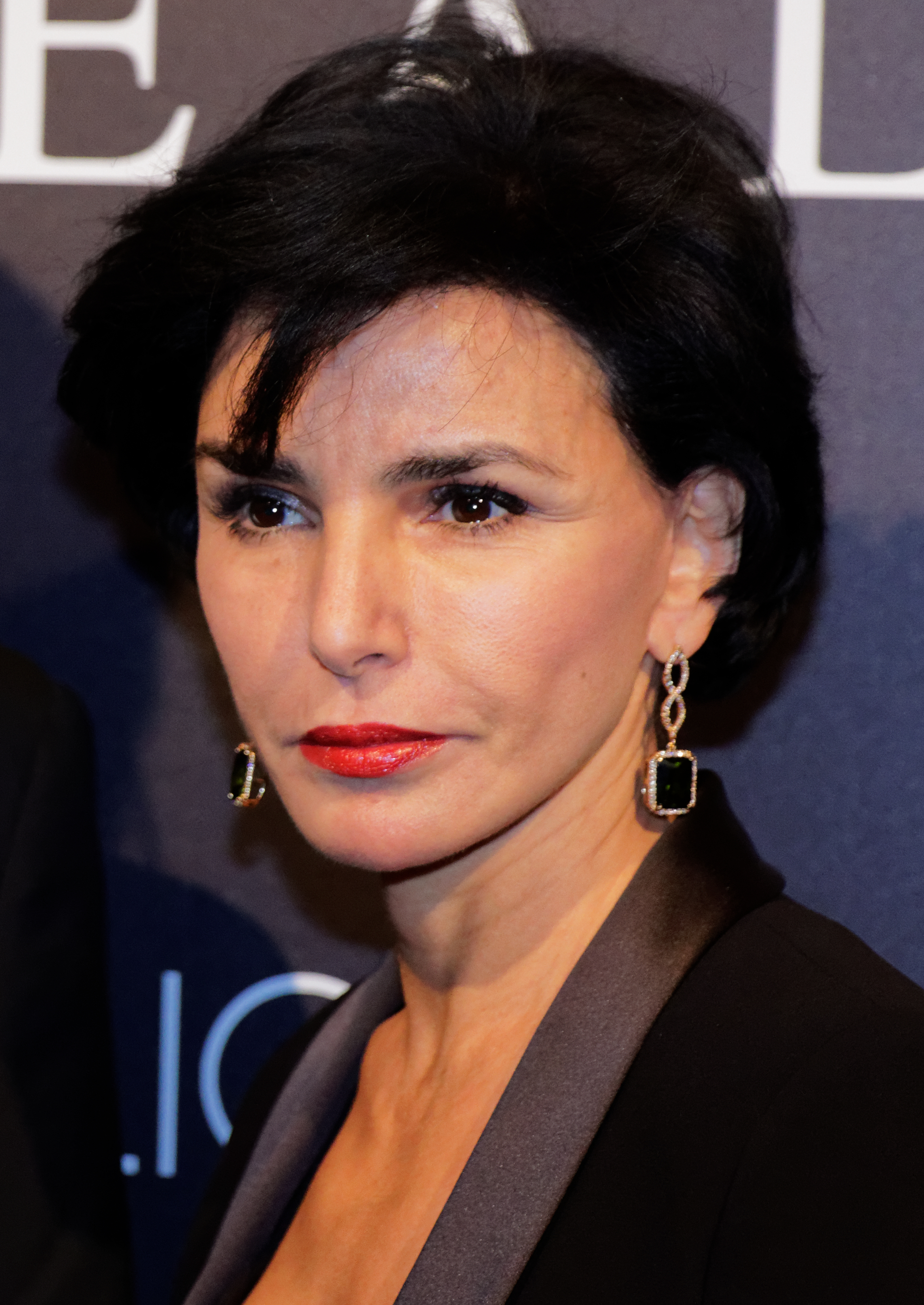
Rachida Dati

- Mustafa Aberchán, Spanish politician leader of the political organization Coalition for Melilla.
- Ahmed Aboutaleb, Moroccan-born Dutch politician, Mayor of Rotterdam
- Davi Alcolumbre, Brazilian politician
- Lolita Aniyar de Castro, Venezuelan teacher, lawyer, politician, and criminologist. She became the first Venezuelan woman to be elected as a senator to the National Congress of Venezuela.
- Khadija Arib, Dutch politician of the Labour Party serving as Speaker of the House of Representatives of the Netherlands since 2015.
- Dalya Attar, American politician
- Farid Azarkan, Dutch politician
- Audrey Azoulay, French politician Minister of Culture since February 2016
- Rachel Bendayan, Canadian politician
- Abraham Bentes, Brazilian Army commander
- Alima Boumediene-Thiery, French politician, member of the European Parliament (1999–2004), of the Senate of France (2004–2011), and member of the French Green party.
- Rachida Dati, first woman from a non-European immigrant background to occupy a key ministerial position in the French Cabinet
- Tofik Dibi, Dutch politician
- Kamal El-Hajji, British security official and civil servant, Serjeant-at-Arms of the House of Commons
- Saïd El Khadraoui, Belgian politician
- Myriam El Khomri, Moroccan-born French politician, current Minister of Labour
- Sari Essayah, Finnish member of the European Parliament
- John Fritchey, Democratic member of the Illinois House of Representatives, representing the 11th District (1996–present)
- Bernard Guetta, French politician and journalist.
- Sir Joshua Abraham Hassan (1915–1997), Gibraltarian politician, and the first mayor and Chief Minister of Gibraltar.
- Fatima Houda-Pepin, Canadian politician and a member of the National Assembly of Quebec
- Leslie Hore-Belisha
- Roger Karoutchi, French ambassador to the OECD and former secretary of state to the French prime minister
- Ahmed Lakhrif, Moroccan politician who held the position of secretary of state for foreign affairs (2007–2008)
- Waldemar Levy Cardoso
- Ahmed Marcouch, Moroccan-Dutch politician and former police officer, civil servant and educator serving as Mayor of Arnhem since 2017.
- Joël Mergui, Moroccan-born French Jewish dermatologist and community leader, serving as the president of the Israelite Central Consistory of France.
- Mohammed Moussaoui, president of the French Council of Muslim Faith
- Jorge Sampaio, Portuguese lawyer and politician who was the 18th president of Portugal (1996–2006) (Moroccan maternal grandmother)
- Najat Vallaud-Belkacem, Moroccan-born French politician, became the first French woman to be appointed Minister of Education, Higher Education, and Research
- Olga Zrihen, Moroccan-born Belgian politician

== Royal Family members ==
- Lalla Meryem, daughter of Hassan II
- Moulay Rachid, son of Hassan II
- Lalla Latifa Hammou, mother of king Mohammed VI
- Lalla Asma, daughter of Hassan II
- Lalla Hasna, daughter of Hassan II
- Moulay Abdallah, brother of Hassan II
- Moulay Hicham, son of Moulay Abdallah
- Lalla Zineb, daughter of Moulay Abdallah
- Lalla Abla bint Tahar, wife of Mohammed V and mother of Hassan II

== Sportspeople ==
=== Archery ===
- Jonathan Ohayon, Canadian archer

=== Athletics ===
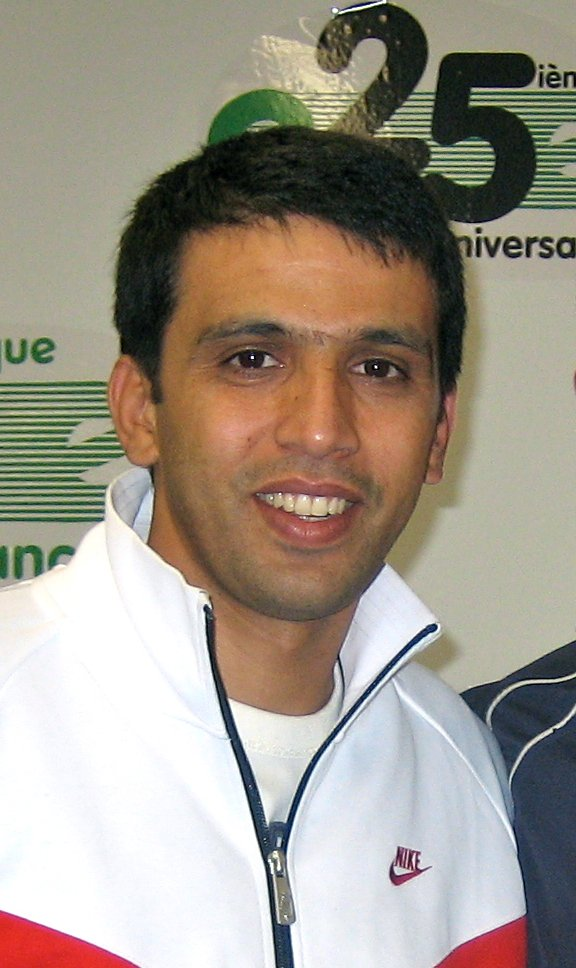
Hicham El Guerrouj

- Abderrahman Ait Khamouch, Spanish-Moroccan Paralympic athlete
- Saïd Aouita
- Hasna Benhassi
- Abdellah Béhar
- Nezha Bidouane
- Brahim Boulami
- Hind Dehiba
- Hicham El Guerrouj
- Driss El Himer
- Nawal El Moutawakel
- Yousef El Nasri, Spanish retired long-distance runner
- Sari Essayah, Finnish retired race walker
- Ilias Fifa, Spanish-Moroccan long-distance runner
- Jaouad Gharib
- Bouchra Ghezielle
- Salah Hissou
- Adil Kaouch
- Abderrahman Ait Khamouch, Spanish paralympic athlete
- Khalid Khannouchi, Moroccan American marathoner
- Brahim Lahlafi
- Driss Maazouzi
- Adel Mechaal, Spanish middle-distance runner
- Abdelaziz Merzougui, Spanish runner
- Mohamed Ouaadi
- Muncef Ouardi, Canadian speed skater
- Zahra Ouaziz
- Rashid Ramzi
- Ismaïl Sghyr
- Khalid Skah
- Achraf Tadili, Canadian runner competing over 800 meters
- Mounir Yemmouni
- Kamal Ziani, retired Spanish long-distance runner
- Bouchra Ghezielle, French-Moroccan track and field athlete

•

=== Basketball ===
- Omri Casspi, Israeli basketball player
- Yogev Ohayon, Israeli basketball player
- Sophian Rafai, French-Moroccan basketball player
- Amit Simhon, Israeli basketball player

=== Boxers ===
- Abdelhak Achik
- Mohammed Achik
- Najib Daho
- Yassine El maachi
- Ismael El Massoudi, French boxer
- Karim El Ouazghari, Spanish boxer
- Ali Hallab
- Driss Moussaid
- Mahdi Ouatine
- Nordine Oubaali, French-Moroccan boxer
- Mohammed Rabii, Moroccan boxer
- Khalid Rahilou, French former professional boxer
- Tahar Tamsamani
- Khadija Mardi, female Moroccan boxer
- Hassan Saada, Moroccan boxer

=== Chess ===
- Thal Abergel, French chess Grandmaster

=== Cycling ===
- Henry Ohayon, Israeli cyclist

=== Fencing ===
- Lydia Hatuel-Czuckermann, Moroccan-born Israeli Olympic fencer
- Ayelet Ohayon, Israeli Olympic fencer

=== Footballers ===
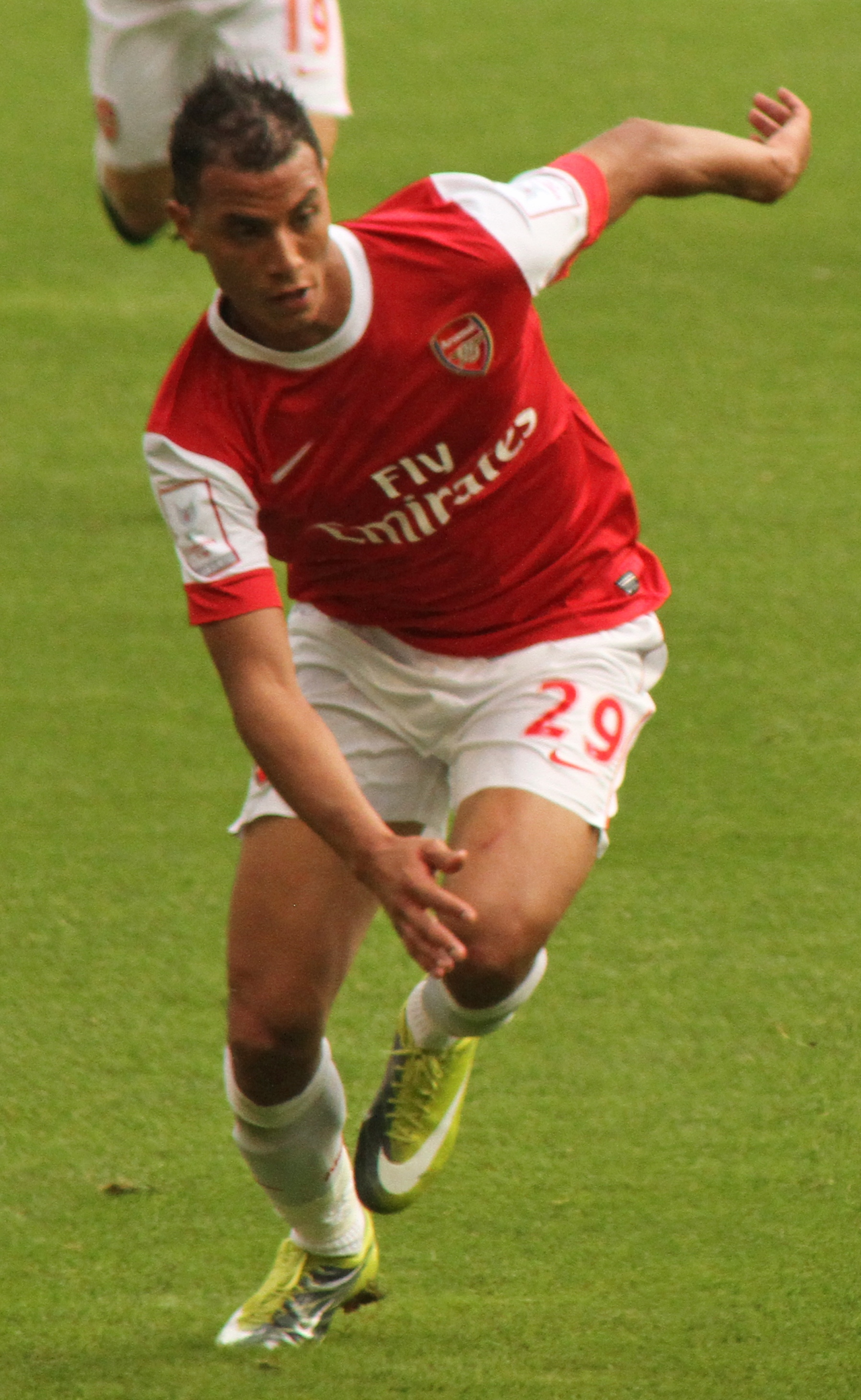
Marouane Chamakh

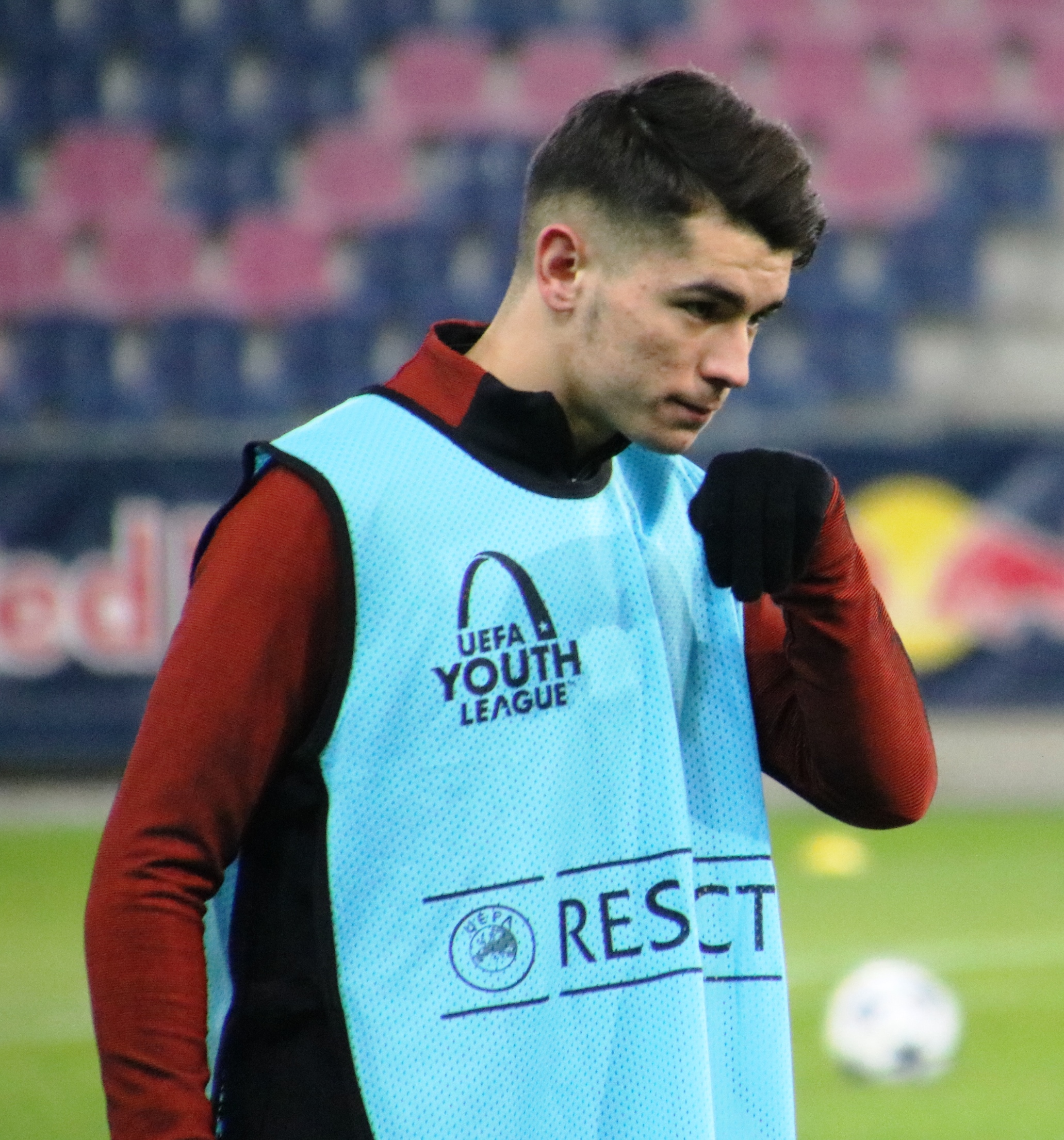
Brahim Diaz

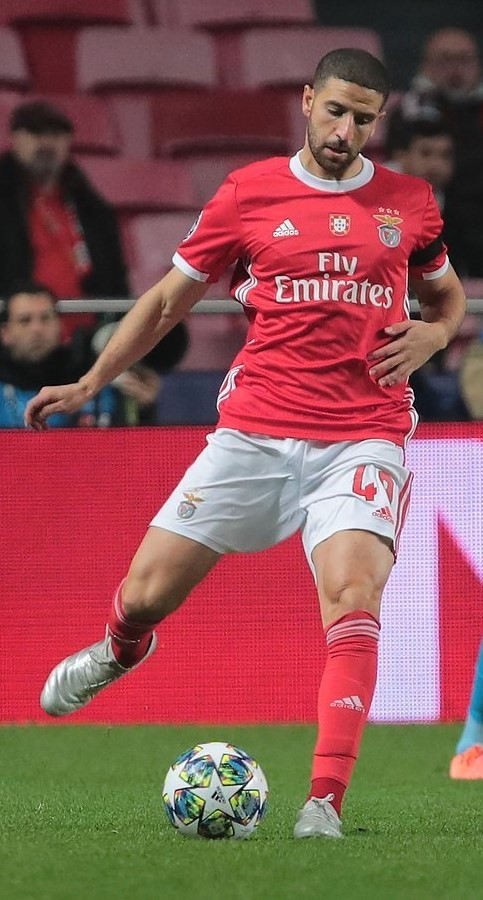
Adel Taarabt

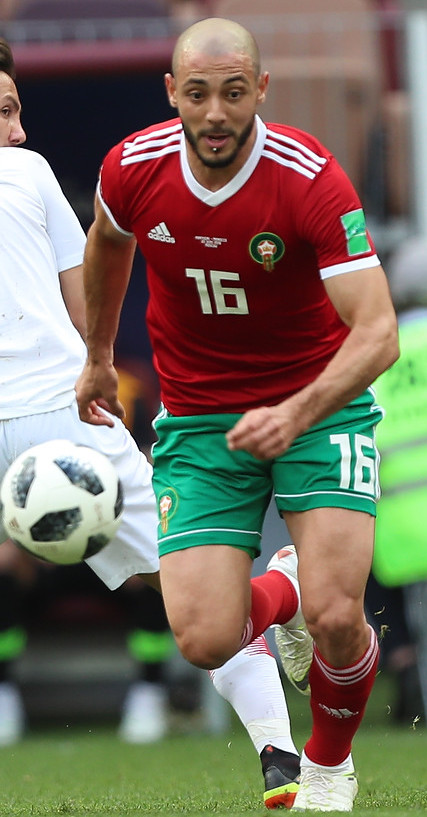
Nordin Amrabat

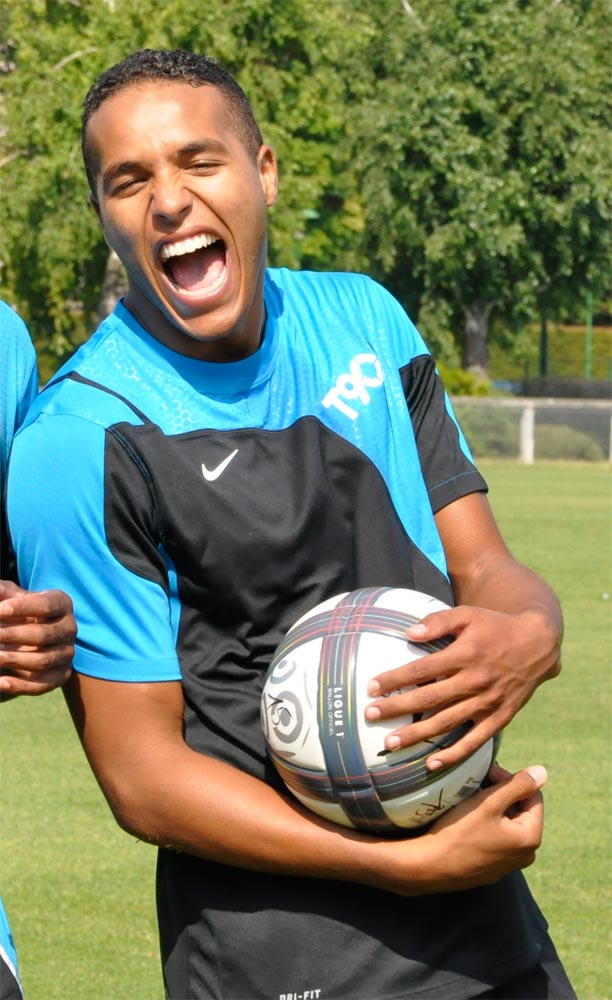
Youssef El-Arabi

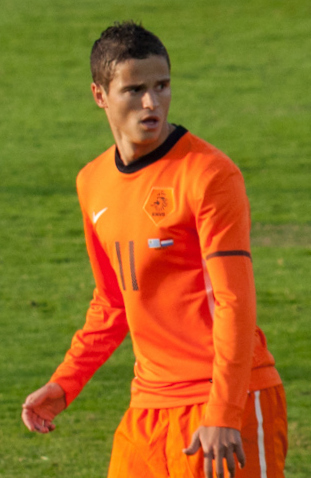
Ibrahim Affelay

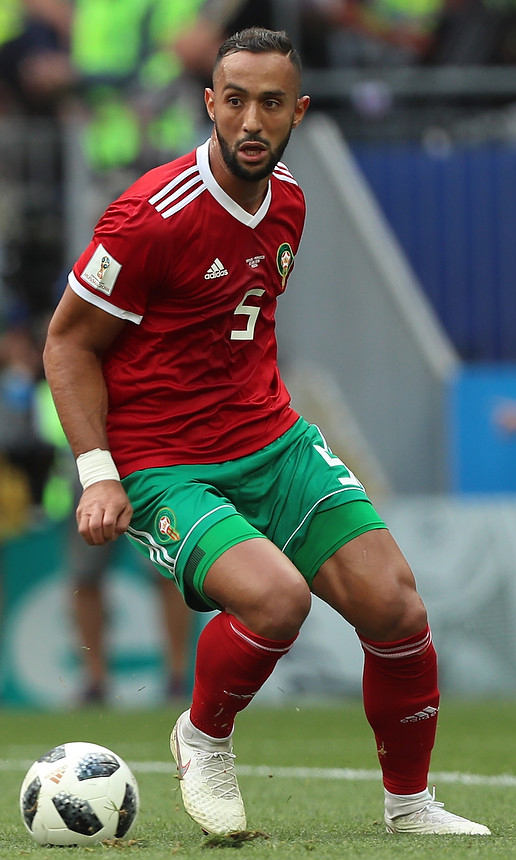
Medhi Benatia

- Zakariya Abarouai, French football player
- Bakr Abdellaoui, Finnish football player
- Yassine Abdellaoui, Dutch-Moroccan football player
- Yacine Abdessadki, French-Moroccan football player
- Brahim Diaz, Spanish-Moroccan football player
- Luciano Abecasis, Argentine football player
- Laurent Abergel, French football player
- Youssef Adnane, French-Moroccan football player
- Ibrahim Afellay, Dutch football player
- Achmed Ahahaoui, Dutch-Moroccan football player
- Ismail Aissati, Dutch-Moroccan football player
- Jamel Aït Ben Idir, French-Moroccan football player
- Karim Aït-Fana, French-Moroccan football player
- Jamal Akachar, Dutch-Moroccan football player
- Zakaria Alaoui, football player
- Rachid Alioui, French-Moroccan football player
- Mustapha Allaoui, football player
- Mohammed Alí Amar, Spanish football player
- Ahmed Ammi, Dutch-Moroccan football player
- Nordin Amrabat, Dutch football player
- Mohamed Amsif, German-born Moroccan football goalkeeper
- Jasin Assehnoun, Finnish football player
- Mimoun Azaouagh, Moroccan-born German footballer
- Karim Azizou, French-Moroccan football player
- Nabil Baha, French-Moroccan football player
- Otman Bakkal, Dutch-Moroccan football player
- Said Bakkati, Dutch-Moroccan football player
- Yacine Bammou, French-Moroccan football player
- Nacer Barazite, Dutch-Moroccan football player
- Abdelaziz Barrada, French-Moroccan football player
- Michaël Chrétien Basser
- Chahir Belghazouani, French-Moroccan football player
- Younès Belhanda, French-Moroccan football player
- Aziz Ben Askar, French football player
- Medhi Benatia, French-Moroccan football player
- Yossi Benayoun, Israeli football player
- Larbi Benbarek, Moroccan football player
- Ismaël Bennacer, French football player
- Younes Bnou Marzouk, French-Moroccan football player
- Rachid Bouaouzan, Dutch-Moroccan football player
- Elbekay Bouchiba, Dutch-Moroccan football player
- Aziz Bouderbala, football player
- Sofiane Boufal, French-Moroccan football player
- Kamel Boughanem, French-Moroccan football player
- Samir Boughanem, French-Moroccan football player
- Khalid Boulahrouz, Dutch-Moroccan football pla
- Nourdin Boukhari, Dutch-Moroccan football player
- Mourad Bounoua, French-Moroccan football player
- Ali Boussaboun, Dutch-Moroccan football player
- Dries Boussatta, Dutch-Moroccan football player
- Mbark Boussoufa, Dutch-Moroccan football player
- Khalid Boutaïb, French-Moroccan football player
- Said Boutahar, Dutch-Moroccan football player
- Ben Butbul, Israeli football player
- Mehdi Carcela-Gonzalez (Spanish father, Moroccan mother)
- Samir Carruthers, Israeli football player
- Kamel Chafni, French-Moroccan football player
- Aatif Chahechouhe, French-Moroccan football player
- Abdelhali Chaiat, Dutch-Moroccan football player
- Khalid Chalqi, Moroccan-born French football player
- Marouane Chamakh, French-Moroccan football player
- Mohammed Chaouch, football player
- Issam Chebake, football player
- Mehdi Courgnaud, French football player
- Manuel da Costa (footballer) (Portuguese father, Moroccan mother)
- Karim Dahou, French football player
- Kenza Dali
- Yassin Daoussi, Finnish football player
- Guy Dayan, Israeli football player
- Roei Dayan, Israeli football player
- Anouar Diba, Dutch-Moroccan football player
- Kieran Djilali, British football player
- Olivier Echouafni, French football player
- Issam El Adoua, football player
- Karim El Ahmadi, Dutch-Moroccan football player
- Youssef El Akchaoui, Dutch-Moroccan football player
- Ahmed El Aouad, French-Moroccan football player
- Youssef El-Arabi, French-born football player
- Yassin El-Azouzi, French-Moroccan football player
- Hakim El Bounadi, French-Moroccan football player
- Faouzi El Brazi, football player
- Samir El Gaaouiri, Dutch-Moroccan football player
- Mustafa El Haddaoui, football player
- Mounir El Haimour, French-Moroccan football player
- Oualid El Hajjam, French football player
- Mounir El Hamdaoui, Dutch-Moroccan football player
- Karim El Idrissi, French-Moroccan football player
- Faysal El Idrissi, French-Moroccan football player
- Shavit Elimelech, Israeli football player
- Alharbi El Jadeyaoui, French-Moroccan football player
- Moestafa El Kabir, Dutch-Moroccan football player
- Badr El Kaddouri
- Abdelhamid El Kaoutari, French football player
- Aziz El Khanchaf, French-Moroccan football player
- Ali El Khattabi, Dutch-Moroccan football player
- Abdou El-Kholti, French football player
- Bouchaib El Moubarki
- Karim El Mourabet, French-Moroccan football player
- Samir El Moussaoui, Dutch-Moroccan football player
- Ahmed Alami Elouali, Moroccan football player
- Ali El-Omari, French-Moroccan football player
- Moha
- Tarik Elyounoussi
- Nabil El Zhar, French football player
- Saïd Ennjimi, Moroccan-born French football player
- Hen Ezra, Israeli football player
- Karim Fachtali, Dutch-Moroccan football player
- Omer Fadida, Israeli football player
- Fayçal Fajr, French-Moroccan football player
- Mohammed Faouzi, Dutch-Moroccan football player
- Marouane Fellaini
- Rayan Frikeche, French-Moroccan football player
- Mustapha Hadji
- Youssef Hadji
- Youssouf Hadji, Moroccan football player
- Samir Hadji, French-Moroccan football player
- Anouar Hadouir, Dutch-Moroccan football player
- Achraf Hakimi, Spanish-Moroccan football player
- Adil Hermach, French-Moroccan football player
- Golan Hermon, Israeli football player
- Nora Heroum, Finnish football player
- Samy Houri, French-Moroccan football player
- Lyes Houri, French-Moroccan football player
- Youssef Idrissi, French-Moroccan football player
- Younès Kaabouni, French football player
- Younès Kaboul, French football player
- Abderrahman Kabous, French-Moroccan football player
- Ahmed Kantari, French-Moroccan football player
- Sakina Karchaoui, French female football player
- David Keltjens, Israeli football player
- Houssine Kharja, Moroccan football player
- Younes Khattabi, Moroccan rugby league player
- Avi Knafo, Israeli football player
- Zakaria Labyad
- Hoda Lattaf, French female football player
- Amine Lecomte, French football player
- Moshe Lugasi, Israeli football player
- Nassir Maachi, Dutch-Moroccan football player
- Mouaad Madri, French-Moroccan football player
- Zinédine Machach, French football player
- Riyad Mahrez, French-Moroccan football player
- Mehdi Messaoudi, French-Moroccan football player
- Mourad Mghizrat, Dutch-Moroccan football player
- Smail Morabit, French-Moroccan football player
- Yassin Moutaouakil, French football player
- Chafik Najih, French football player
- Lamine Yamal Nasraoui, Spanish football player
- Noureddine Naybet
- Mounir Obbadi, French-Moroccan football player
- Leila Ouahabi, Spanish-Moroccan football player
- Amine Oudrhiri, French football player
- Yacine Qasmi, French-Moroccan football player
- Adil Rami, French football player
- Adil Ramzi
- Adrien Regattin, French football player
- Walid Regragui, French-Moroccan football player and manager
- Hamid Rhanem, French football player
- Youssef Safri
- Karim Safsaf, French football player
- Romain Saïss, French football player
- Hamza Sakhi, French-Moroccan football player
- Victor Sarusi, Israeli football player
- Salaheddine Sbai, football player
- Youssef Sekour, French-Moroccan football player
- Tarik Sektioui, football player
- Khalid Sinouh, Dutch-Moroccan football player
- Hassan Souari, football player
- Mounir Soufiani, French football player
- Tomer Swisa, Israeli football player
- Adel Taarabt, Moroccan football player
- Idan Tal, Israeli football player
- Farid Talhaoui, French football player
- Mehdi Taouil, French football player
- Eitan Tibi, Israeli football player
- Karim Touzani, Dutch-Moroccan football player
- Yoann Touzghar, French football player
- Smahi Triki, football player
- Badou Zaki
- Merouane Zemmama
- Roei Zikri, Israeli football player
- Hakim Ziyech, Dutch-Moroccan football player
- Abdellah Zoubir, French football player
- Niv Zrihan, Israeli football player

=== Ice hockey ===
- Josh Tordjman, Canadian ice hockey goaltender
- David Ettedgui, Hockey Agent, Radio and TV Hockey analyst

=== Kickboxers ===
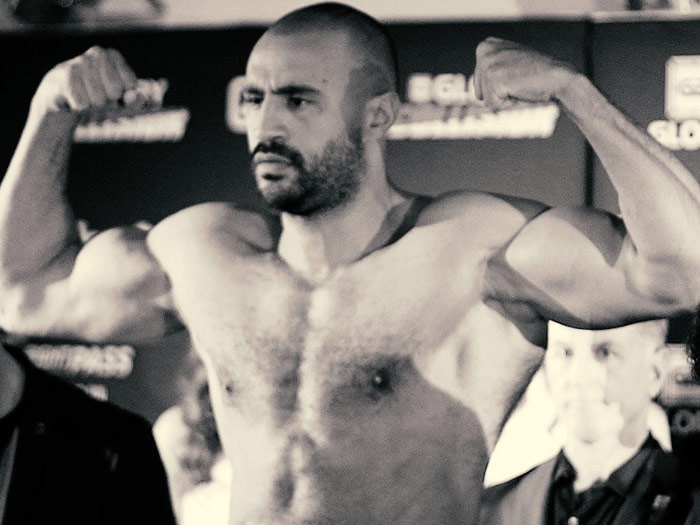
Badr Hari

- Cyril Abidi, Savate Champion and Muay Thai World Champion
- Badr Hari, K-1 Heavyweight champion and K-1 World GP 2008 finalist
- Chalid Arrab
- Faldir Chahbari
- Chahid Oulad El Hadj
- Aziz Jahjah

=== Martial artists ===
- Karim Ghajji, French kickboxer and B-boy
- Lee Lamrani Ibrahim "Lightning" Murray, cage fighter turned gangster (Moroccan father, English mother)
- Khalid Ismail, MMA-fighter
- Zakaria Moumni, Moroccan kickboxer
- Farid Villaume, French Muay Thai kickboxer

=== Rugby footballers ===
- Abdelatif Benazzi
- Abdellatif Boutaty, rugby union player
- Abderazak El Khalouki, French rugby league player
- Jamal Fakir, Moroccan-born French rugby league player
- Adel Fellous, French rugby league player
- Younes Khattabi
- Djalil Narjissi
- Fouad Yaha, French rugby league player

=== Racers ===
- Victor Soussan, Moroccan-born Australian Grand Prix motorcycle racing
- Michaël Benyahia, Moroccan-American Open Wheel Race Car Driver, 2017 Formula Renault NEC Champion 2017 Formula Renault Northern European Cup

=== Rowing ===
- Moe Sbihi

=== Ski ===
- Kenza Tazi, Moroccan-American alpine skier; Olympian
- Adam Lamhamedi, Moroccan-Canadian alpine skier; Olympian
- Samir Azzimani, Moroccan-French alpine skier; Olympian

=== Runners ===
- Abdelhakim Bagy, Moroccan-born French long-distance runner
- Abdellah Béhar, Moroccan-born runner specialized in the 5000 metres and cross-country running
- Fouad Chouki, French middle-distance runner, specialized in the 1500 metres
- Driss El Himer, Moroccan-born long-distance runner
- Abderrahim El Haouzy, Moroccan-born French sprinter
- Mustapha Essaïd, Moroccan-born French runner who specialized in the 5000 meters
- Mohamed Ezzher, Moroccan-born French long-distance runner
- Adam Gemili, British sprinter
- Brahim Lahlafi, Moroccan former long-distance runner
- Driss Maazouzi, Moroccan-born 1500 meters athlete runner
- Mohamed Ouaadi, Moroccan-born French long-distance runner who specialized in the marathon
- Yamna Oubouhou, Moroccan-born French long-distance runner
- Ismaïl Sghyr, French-Moroccan long-distance runner
- Mounir Yemmouni, Moroccan-born French middle-distance runner specialized in the 1500 meters
- Fatima Ezzahra Gardadi, Moroccan long-distance runner
- Fatima Birdaha, Moroccan middle-distance runner
- Soufiane El Bakkali, Moroccan middle-distance runner

=== Tennis players ===
- Karim Alami
- Hicham Arazi
- Younes El Aynaoui
- Yshai Oliel, Israeli junior tennis player
- Lina Qostal

=== Wrestlers ===
- Layla El

== Writers ==
=== Twentieth century ===
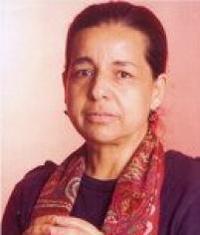
Leila Abouzeid

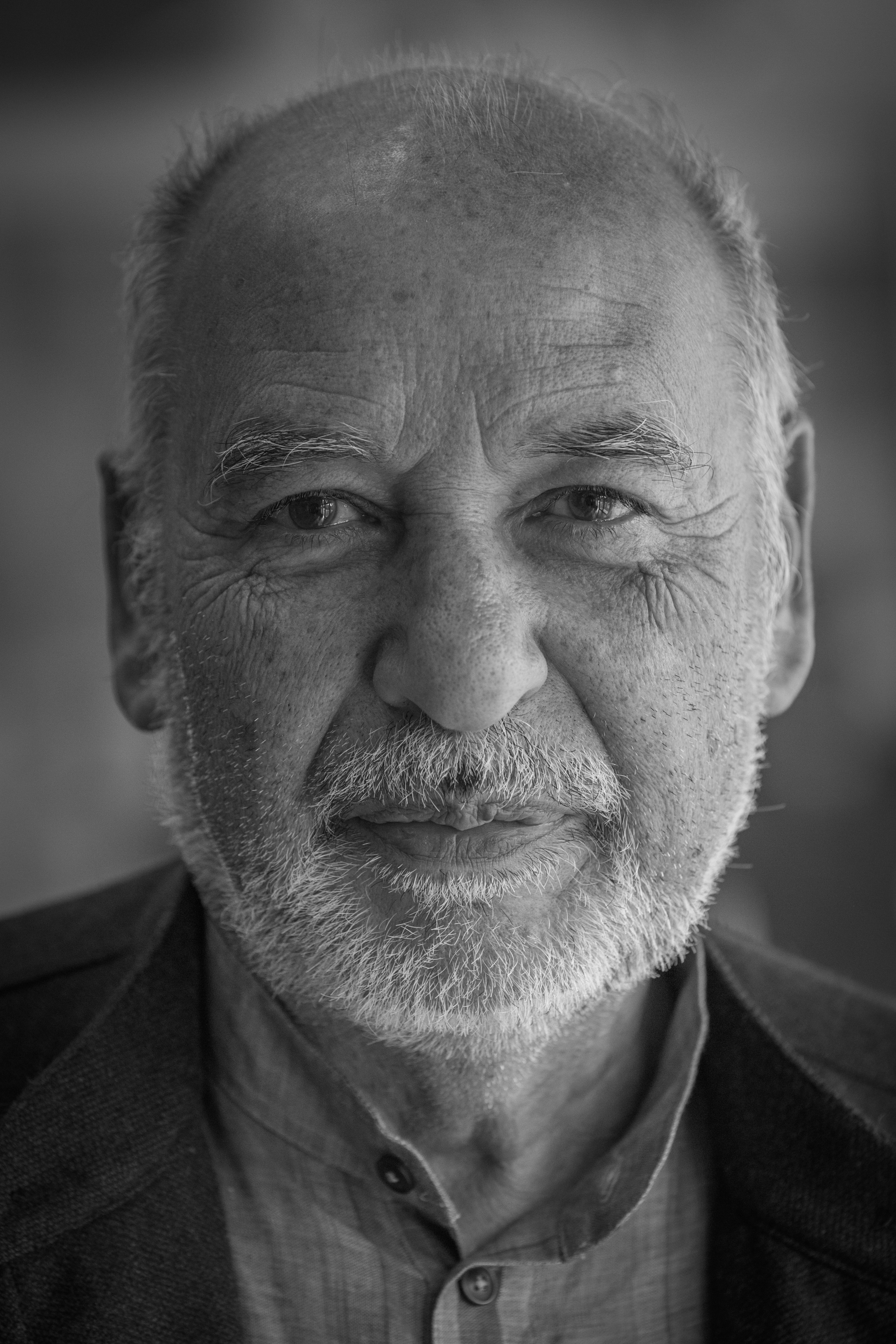
Tahar Ben Jelloun

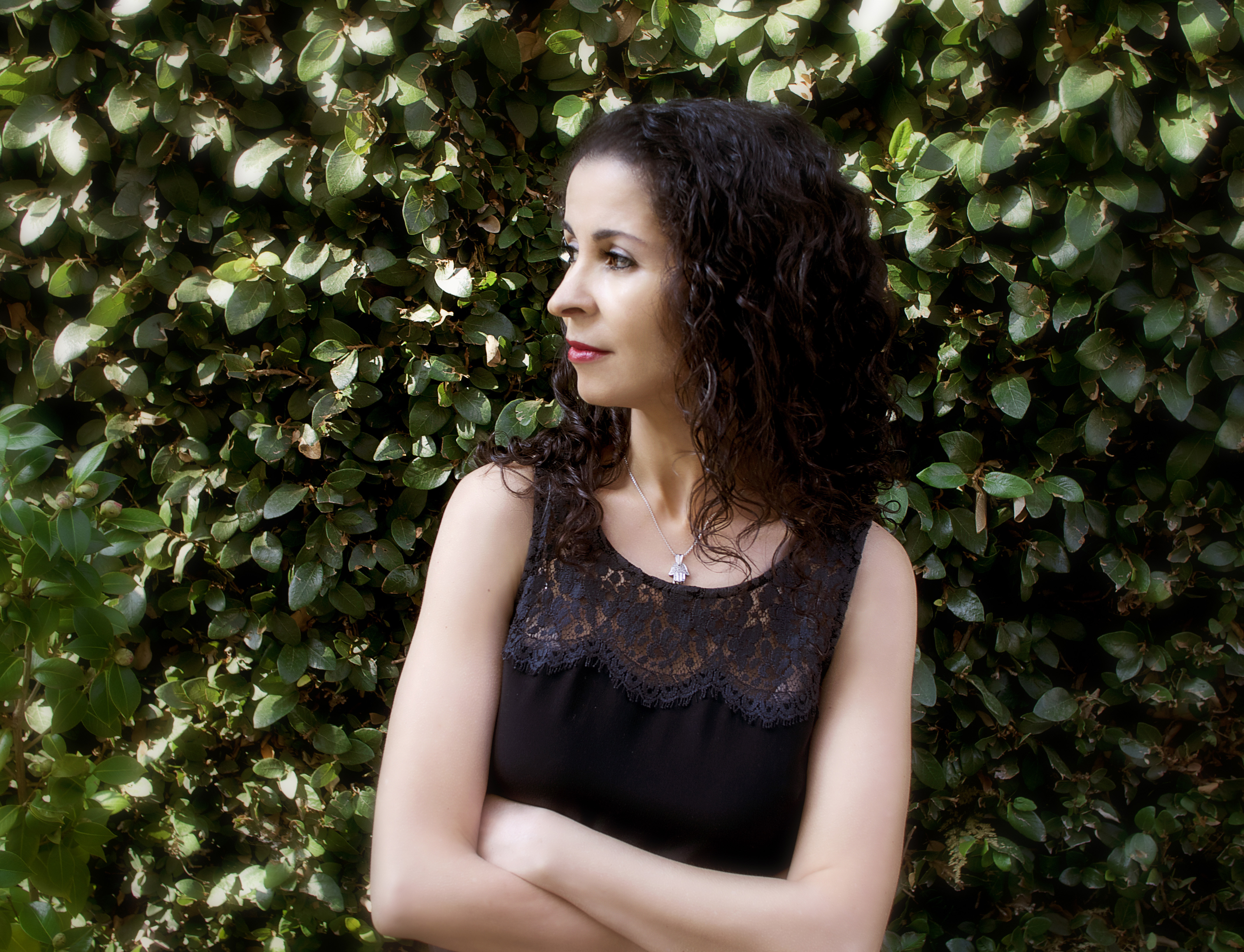
Laila Lalami

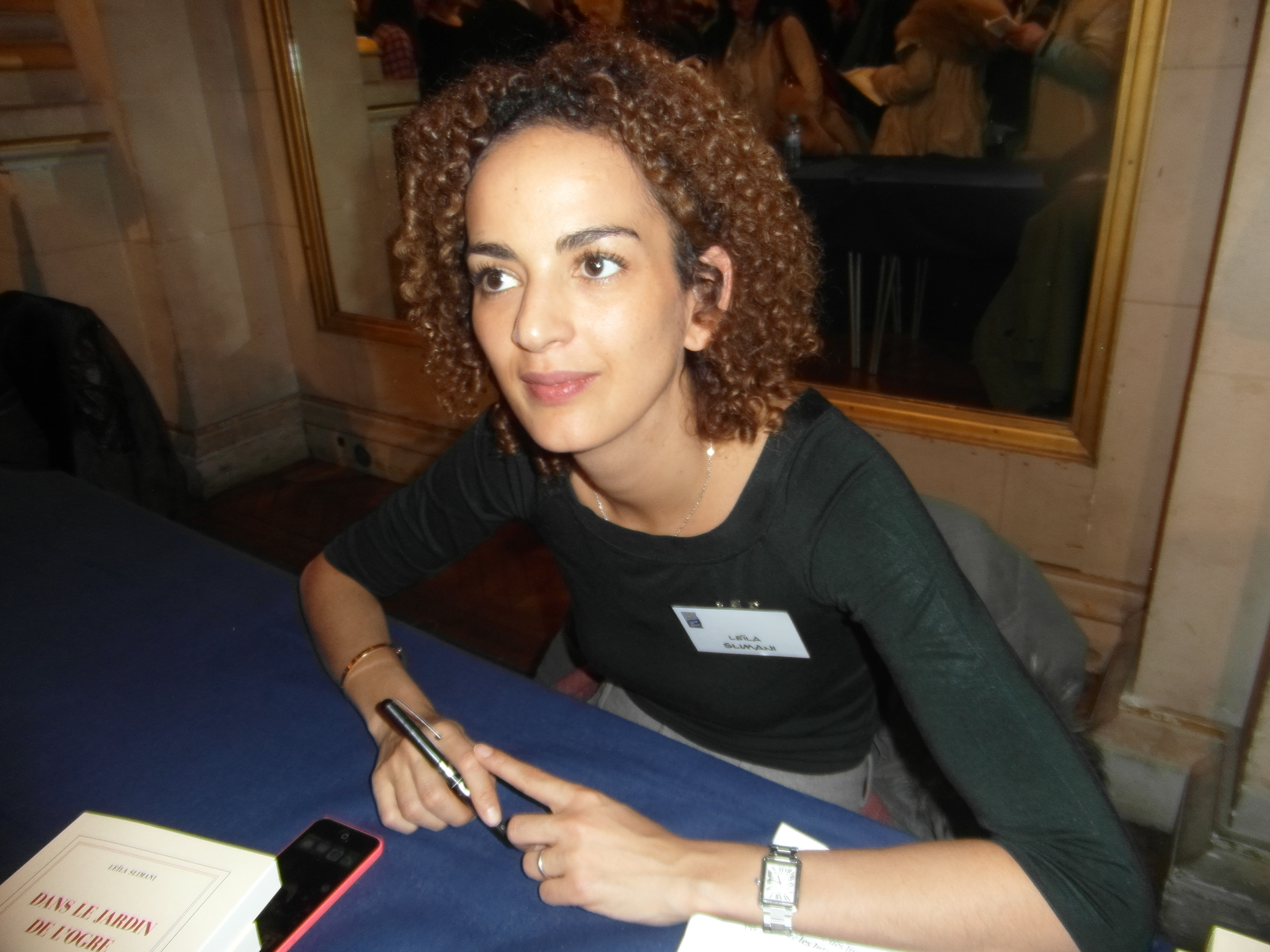
Leïla Slimani

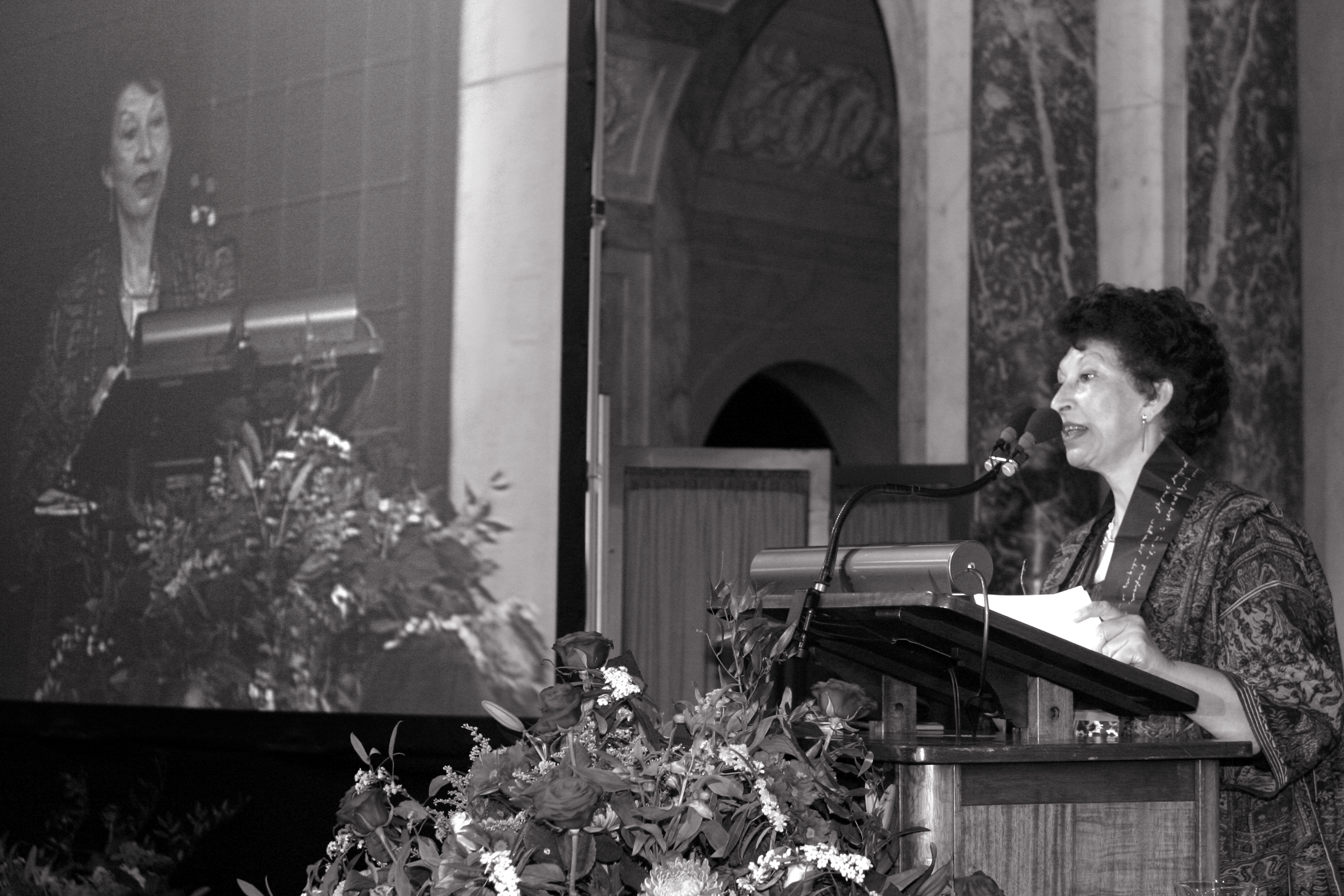
Fatema Mernissi

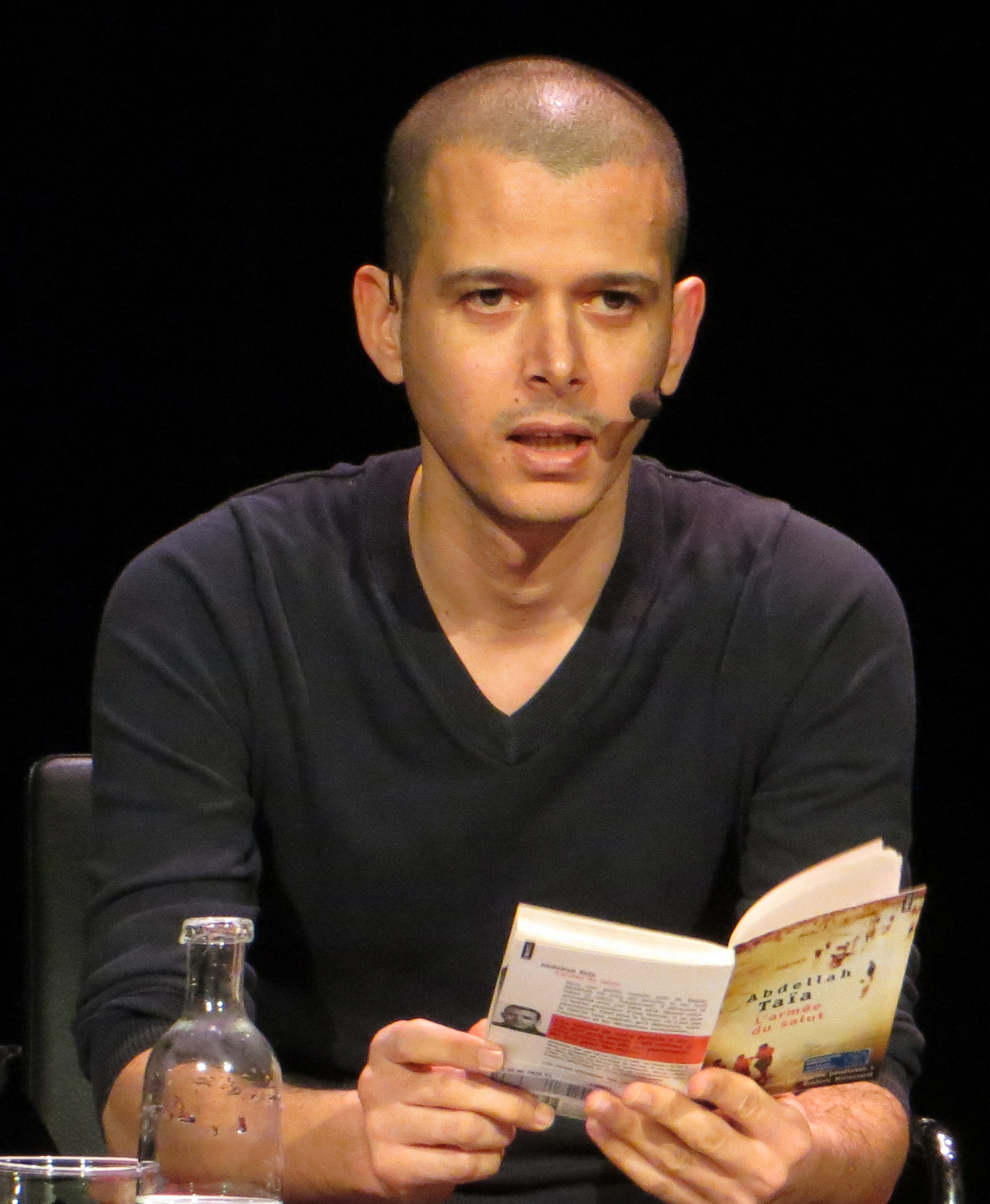
Abdellah Taïa

- Leila Abouzeid, Arabic-language novelist
- Mohammed Achaari, writer, poet and politician
- Said Achtouk, poet, musician and songwriter
- Mririda n'Ait Attik (c. 1900–c. 1930), Tashelhit-language poet
- Lotfi Akalay, writer and businessman
- Idriss ibn al-Hassan al-Alami (1925–2007)
- Mohammed ibn Mohammed Alami, poet
- Allal al-Fassi (1910–1974)
- Malika al-Fassi, journalist, playwright, novelist
- Mohammed al-Habib al-Fourkani (1922–2008)
- Abd al-Aziz al-Ghumari (1920–1997)
- Abdullah al-Ghumari (1910–1993)
- Ahmad al-Ghumari (1902–1961)
- Mohammed Abed al-Jabri (1936–2010)
- Ahmad al-Tayyeb Aldj (born 1928)
- Tewfik Allal (born 1947)
- Ahmed al-Madini (born 1949)
- Mohammed al-Makki al-Nasiri (1906–1994)
- Tuhami al-Wazzani (1903–1972)
- Ali ibn Qasim al-Zaqqaq (died 1506)
- Ali Azaykou (1942–2004)
- Hassan Bahara (born 1978), Moroccan-Dutch writer
- Latifa Baka, novelist, short story writer
- Hafsa Bekri, poet, short story writer, feminist writer
- Abdelmalek Belghiti (1906–2010)
- Abdelkader Benali (born 1975)
- Mehdi Ben Barka (1920–1965)
- Siham Benchekroun, novelist, poet, short story writer
- Rajae Benchemsi, poet, essayist, novelist
- Abdelmajid Benjelloun (1919–1981)
- Abdelmajid Benjelloun (born 1944)
- Tahar Ben Jelloun (born 1944)
- Abdelwahab Benmansour (1920–13 November 2008)
- Mohammed Suerte Bennani (born 1961)
- Mohammed Bennis (born 1948)
- Khnata Bennouna, novelist, short story writer
- Khnata bent Bakkar, dowager sultana, biographer, letter writer
- Mohammed Benzakour (born 1972)
- Mohammed Berrada (born 1938)
- Hafsa Bikri
- Mahi Binebine (born 1959)
- Ali Bourequat
- Ahmed Bouzfour (born 1954)
- Al-Yazid al-Buzidi Bujrafi (1925–2011)
- Mohamed Chafik (born 1926)
- Nadia Chafik, novelist, non-fiction writer, educator
- Driss Ben Hamed Charhadi (1937–1986)
- Mohamed Choukri (1935–2003)
- Driss Chraïbi (1926–2007)
- Mohammed Daoud (1901–1984)
- Zakya Daoud, French-born Moroccan journalist, magazine editor, non-fiction writer
- Farida Diouri, novelist
- Najat El Hachmi (born 1979)
- Youssouf Amine Elalamy (born 1961)
- Nicole Elgrissy, Moroccan writer and activist
- Mohammed Aziz El-Hababi (1922–1993)
- Najat El Hachmi, Spanish-Moroccan writer
- Allal El Hajjam (born 1948)
- Driss El Khouri
- Mahdi Elmandjra (1933–2014)
- Mohammed El-Moustaoui (born 1943)
- Youssef Fadel (born 1949)
- Halima Ferhat
- Abdelkrim Ghallab (1919–2006)
- Soumya Naâmane Guessous, best-selling non-fiction writer, sociologist, educator
- Abdallah Guennoun (1910–1989)
- Ali Haddani (1936–2007)
- Badia Hadj Nasser
- Ahmed Harrak Srifi (died 1925)
- Ben Salem Himmich (born 1947)
- Ali Squalli Houssaini (1932–2018)
- Salim Jay (born 1951)
- Abderrafi Jouahri (born 1943)
- Abdelkarim Jouiti (born 1962)
- Ahmed Joumari (1939–1995)
- Maati Kabbal
- Mohammed Kaghat (1942–2001)
- Mohammed Khammar Kanouni (1938–1991)
- Mohammed Khaïr-Eddine (1941–1995)
- Abdelkebir Khatibi (1938–2009)
- Rita El Khayat, psychiatrist, publisher, women's rights activist, non-fiction writer
- Abdelfattah Kilito (born 1945)
- Driss Ksikes
- Abdellatif Laabi (born 1942)
- Leila Lahlou, author of the novel Do Not Forget God (1987)
- Mohammed Aziz Lahbabi (1922–1993)
- Abdelrahim Lahbibi (born 1950)
- Laila Lalami, Moroccan-American novelist, essayist
- Wafaa Lamrani, poet
- Abdallah Laroui (born 1933)
- Fouad Laroui (born 1958), Moroccan economist and writer
- Mohammed Leftah (1946–2008)
- Ahmed Lemsih (born 1950)
- Ali Lmrabet (born 1959)
- Zahra Mansouri
- Ahmed Mejjati (1936–1995)
- Saida Menebhi, poet, Marxist activist
- Fatema Mernissi, feminist writer, sociologist
- Mohamed Mrabet (born 1936)
- Mostafa Nissaboury (born 1943)
- Rachid O (born 1970)
- Malika Oufkir, memoirist, author of Stolen Lives: Twenty Years in a Desert Jail
- Touria Oulehri, novelist, critic
- Bachir Qamari (1951–2021)
- Mubarak Rabi (born 1938)
- Mohamed Said Raihani (born 1968)
- Fouzia Rhissassi, educator, women's rights activist, non-fiction writer
- Najima Rhozali, non-fiction writer, politician
- Mohammed Sabila
- Abdelhadi Said (born 1974)
- Thouria Saqqat, children's writer
- Tayeb Seddiki (born 1938)
- Ahmed Sefrioui (1915–2004)
- Mohamed Serghini (born 1930)
- Abdelhak Serhane
- Mohamed Sibari (born 1945)
- Hourya Sinaceur, philosopher, non-fiction writer
- Mohammed Allal Sinaceur (born 1941)
- Ali Siqli (born 1932)
- Leïla Slimani, French-Moroccan writer
- Mohammed al-Mokhtar Soussi (1900–1963)
- Abdelkarim Tabbal (born 1931)
- Abdellah Taïa (born 1973)
- Abdelhadi Tazi (1921–2015)
- Mahjoub Tobji (born 1942)
- Abdelkhalek Torres (1910–1970)
- Houcine Toulali (1924–1998)
- Ahmed Toufiq (born 1943)
- Bahaa Trabelsi, novelist, journalist, magazine editor
- Said Yaktine (born 1955)
- Nadia Yassine (born 1958)
- Mohamed Zafzaf (1942–2001)
- Mohammed Zniber (1923–1993)
- Abdallah Zrika (born 1953)

=== Nineteenth century ===
- Mohammed ibn Abu al-Qasim al-Sijilmasi (died 1800)
- Mohammed ibn Abd as-Salam ibn Nasir (died 1824)
- Mohammed Ibn Amr (died 1827)
- Thami Mdaghri (died 1856)
- Idriss al-Amraoui (died 1879)
- Ahmad ibn Hamdun ibn al-Hajj (died 1898)
- Abd as-Salam al-Alami (1834–1895)
- Ahmad ibn Khalid al-Nasiri (1835–1897)
- Salomon Berdugo (1854–1906)
- Muhammad ibn al-Qasim al-Badisi (died 1922)
- Mohammed ibn Jaafar al-Kattani (1858–1927)
- Ibn Zaydan (1873–1946)
- Muhammad Ibn al-Habib (1876–1972)
- Ahmed Skirej (1878–1944)
- Abdelkrim al-Khattabi (1882–1963)
- Mohammed Boujendar (1889–1926)
- Mohammed Ben Brahim (1897–1955)

=== Eighteenth century ===
- Mohammed ibn abd al-Wahab al-Ghassani (died 1707)
- Mohammed ibn Qasim ibn Zakur (died 1708)
- Mohammed ibn al-Tayyib al-Alami (died 1722)
- Abd al-Qadir ibn Shaqrun (died after 1727/8)
- Mohammed ibn Zakri al-Fasi (died 1731)
- Ahmed ibn al-Mubarak al-Lamti al-Sijilmasi (died 1741)
- Khnata bent Bakkar (died 1754)
- Ibn al-Wannan (died 1773)
- Ahmed al-Ghazzal (died 1777)
- Abd Allah ibn Azzuz (died 1789)
- Mohammed al-Qadiri (1712–1773)
- David Hassine (1722–1792)
- Abu al-Qasim al-Zayyani (1734–1833)
- Kaddour El Alamy (1742–1850)
- Raphael Berdugo (1747–1821)
- Sulayman al-Hawwat (1747–1816)
- Ahmad ibn Ajiba (1747–1809)
- Mohammed al-Duayf (born 1752)
- Mohammed al-Tayyib ibn Kiran (1758–1812)
- Muhammad al-Arabi al-Darqawi (1760–1823)
- Hamdun ibn al-Hajj al-Fasi (1760–1817)
- Ahmad ibn Idris al-Fasi (1760–1837)
- Suleiman al-Alawi (1760–1822)
- Mohammed al-Harraq (1772–1845)
- Mohammed al-Haik (fl. 1790)
- Mohammed al-Tawdi ibn Suda (1790–1794/5)
- Ahmed al-Salawi (1791–1840)
- Mohammed ibn Idris al-Amrawi (1794–1847)
- Mohammed Akensus (1797–1877)
- Hemmou Talb (18th century)

=== Seventeenth century ===
- Abd al-Rahman al-Tamanarti (died 1650)
- Abu Abdallah Mohammed al-Murabit al-Dila'i (died 1678)
- Mohammed ibn Nasir (1603–1674)
- Mohammed al-Mahdi al-Fasi (1624–1698)
- Mohammed al-Rudani (c. 1627–1683)
- Abu Salim al-Ayyashi (1628–1679)
- Abd al-Rahman al-Fasi (1631–1685)
- Abu Ali al-Hassan al-Yusi (1631–1691)
- Ahmed ibn Nasir (1647–1717)
- Abd as-Salam al-Qadiri (1648–1698)
- Abd al-Wahhab Adarrak (1666–1746)
- Mohammed Awzal (1670–1749)
- Mohammed al-Ifrani (1670–1745)
- Ahmed ibn al-Mubarak al-Lamati (1679–1743)
- Mohammed ibn al-Tayyib (1698–1756)

=== Sixteenth century ===
- Abraham ben Solomon
- Ali ibn Qasim al-Zaqqaq (died 1506)
- Abdallah al-Ghazwani (died 1529)
- Abderrahman El Majdoub (died 1569)
- Abu-l-Hasan al-Tamgruti (died 1594/5)
- Ahmed al-Mandjur (1520–1587)
- Abu Abdallah ibn Askar (1529–1578)
- Abul Qasim ibn Mohammed al-Ghassani (1548–1610)
- Abd al-Aziz al-Fishtali (1549–1621)
- Ahmad Ibn al-Qadi (1553–1616)
- Ahmed ibn Abi Mahalli (1559–1613)
- Abraham Azulai (c. 1570–1643)
- Mohammed al-Arbi al-Fasi (1580–1642)
- Abdelaziz al-Maghrawi (c. 1580–1600)
- Ahmed Mohammed al-Maqqari (c. 1591–1632)
- Muhammad Mayyara (1591–1662)
- Abd al-Qadir al-Fasi (1599–1680)
- Al-Masfiwi (16th century)

=== Fifteenth century ===
- Abdarrahman al-Makudi (died 1405)
- Muhammad al-Jazuli (died 1465)
- Ibrahim ibn Hilal al-Sijilmasi (died c. 1498)
- Ibn Ghazi al-Miknasi (1437–1513)
- Ahmad Zarruq (1442–1493)
- Leo Africanus (1488–1554)

=== Fourteenth century ===
- Abu Mohammed al-Qasim al-Sijilmasi (died 1304)
- Ibn Abi Zar (died c. 1315)
- Abu al-Hassan Ali ibn Mohammed al-Zarwili (died 1319)
- Abd al-Haqq al-Badisi (died after 1322)
- Ibn Shuayb (died 1349)
- Ibn Idhari (beginning of the 14th century)
- Ibn Battuta (1304–1377)
- Mohammed al-Hazmiri (fl. 1320)
- Ibn Juzayy (1321–1357)
- Abu Muqri Mohammed al-Battiwi (fl. 1331)
- Ibn Abbad al-Rundi (1333–1390)
- Abu Yahya ibn al-Sakkak (1335–1415)
- Abd al-Rahman al-Jadiri (1375–1416)
- Ismail ibn al-Ahmar (1387–1406)
- Abu al-Hasan Ali al-Jaznai (14th century)

=== Thirteenth century ===
- Ibn al-Yasamin (died 1204)
- Ahmad ibn Munim al-Abdari (died 1228)
- Ibn al-Zayyat al-Tadili (died 1229/30)
- Abd al-Rahman al-Fazazi (died 1230)
- Ali ibn al-Qattan (died 1231)
- Ibn al-Khabbaza (died 1239)
- Abdelaziz al-Malzuzi (died 1298)
- Salih ben Sharif al-Rundi (1204–1285)
- Malik ibn al-Murahhal (1207–1289)
- Ibn abd al-Malik al-Marrakushi (1237–1303)
- Mohammed ibn Hajj al-Abdari al-Fasi (c. 1256–1336)
- Ibn al-Banna al-Marrakushi (1256–1321)
- Mohammed ibn Rushayd (1259–1321)
- Mohammed ibn Adjurrum (1273–1323)
- Abu Ali al-Hasan al-Marrakushi (fl. 1281/2)
- Mohammed al-Abdari al-Hihi (fl. c. 1289)
- Judah ben Nissim (13th century)
- Nahum Ma'arabi

=== Twelfth century ===
- Ibn Bajjah (died 1138)
- Abu Jafar ibn Atiyya (died 1158)
- Ali ibn Harzihim (died 1163)
- Al-Suhayli (1114–1185)
- Zechariah Aghmati (1120–1195)
- Abu al-Abbas as-Sabti (1129–1204)
- Abu al-Abbas al-Jarawi (1133–1212)
- Abd as-Salam ibn Mashish (1140–1227)
- Mohammed ibn Qasim al-Tamimi (1140/5–1207/8)
- Ibn Dihya al-Kalby (1149–1235)
- Mohammed al-Baydhaq (c. 1150)
- Abu Mohammed Salih (1153–1234)
- Joseph ben Judah of Ceuta (c. 1160–1226)
- Abu al-Abbas al-Azafi (1162–1236)
- Abdelwahid al-Marrakushi (born 1185)
- Abu-l-Hassan ash-Shadhili (1196–1258)
- Abu Bakr al-Hassar (12th century)

=== Eleventh century ===
- Abu Imran al-Fasi (died 1038)
- Isaac Alfasi (1013–1103)
- Mohammed ibn Tumart (c. 1080–1130)
- Qadi Ayyad ben Moussa (1083–1149)
- Mohammed al-Idrisi (1099–1165)

=== Tenth century ===
- Dunash ben Labrat (920–990), medieval Jewish commentator, poet, and grammarian
- Judah ben David Hayyuj (945–1000)
- David ben Abraham al-Fasi (c. 950–1000)

== Crime, offenders or victims ==
- Ridouan Taghi, Dutch-moroccan drug lord
- Hamed Abderrahaman Ahmad, Spanish suspected terrorist
- Mohamed Taieb Ahmed, Spanish drug lord trafficking hashish across the Strait of Gibraltar
- Samir Azzouz
- Said Bahaji
- Lalla Batoul, imprisoned and tortured under Sultan Abdelhafid
- Racid Belkacem
- Nordin Benallal, self-styled "escape king"
- Ibrahim Bin Shakaran
- Ahmed Bouchiki
- Mohammed Bouyeri
- Adil Charkaoui, Moroccan-born Canadian citizen arrested under security certificate in 2003
- Tarek Dergoul
- Malika El Aroud
- Nathan Elbaz
- Nouredine el Fahtni
- Farid Essebar
- Zakariya Essabar
- Younis Mohammad Ibrahim al-Hayyari
- Mounir El Motassadeq
- Khalil el-Moumni
- Ilan Halimi
- Jamila M'Barek
- Zacarias Moussaoui
- Lee Murray
- Abdelghani Mzoudi
- Abdellah Ouzghar, Moroccan suspected of ties to terrorist organizations
- Younes Tsouli, Moroccan-British convicted of incitement of terrorism

== See also ==
- Moroccans
- List of Morocco-related topics
- List of Dutch people of Moroccan descent
- List of German people of Moroccan descent
- People born in Casablanca
- Pallache family
