= Rafael Edri =

Israeli businessman and politician (1937–2024)

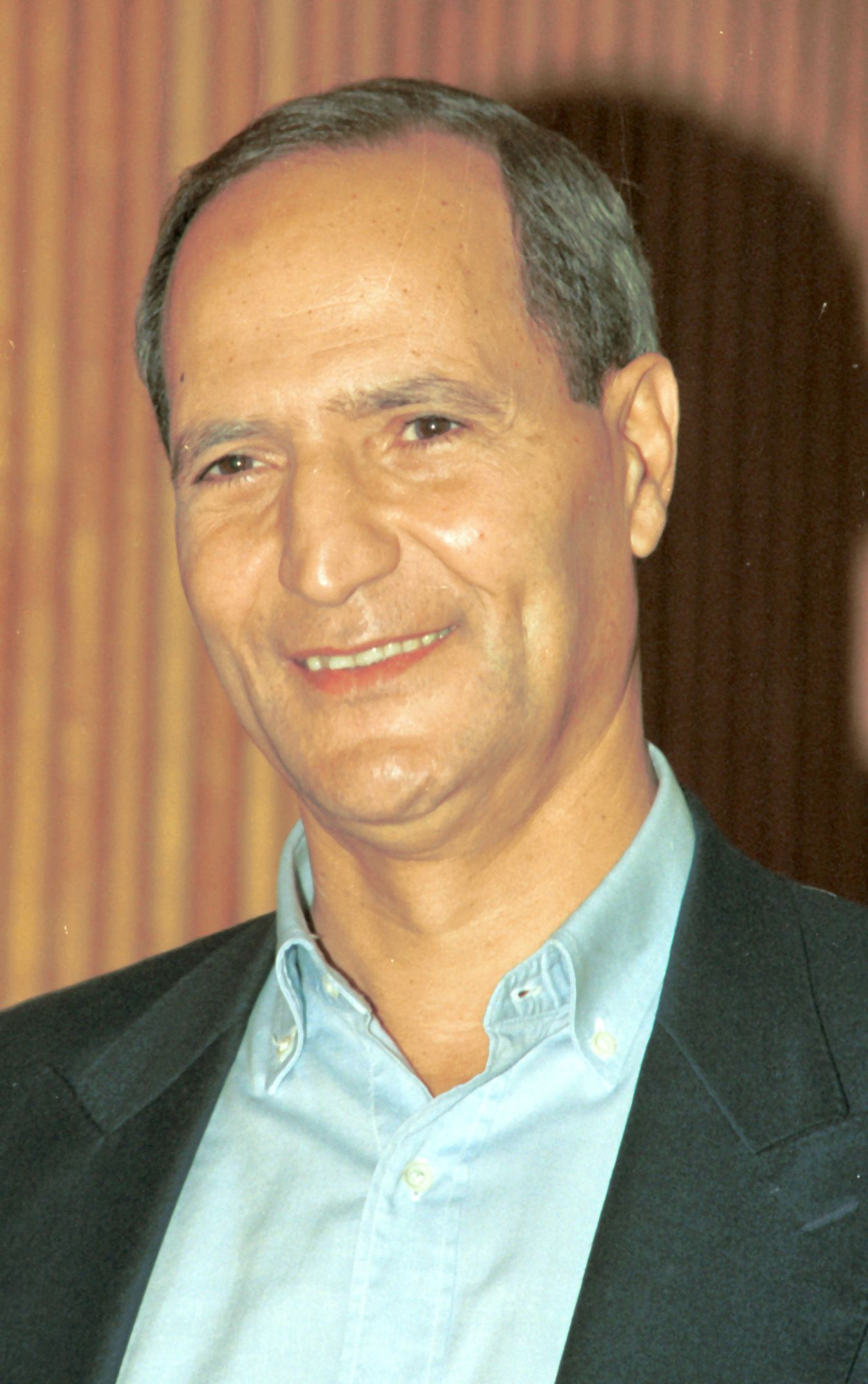
- Edri in 1991

Ministerial roles
- 1988–1990: Minister without Portfolio
- 1990: Minister of the Environment

Faction represented in the Knesset
- 1981–1991: Alignment
- 1991–1999: Labor Party

Personal details
- Born: 10 September 1937 Casablanca, French Morocco
- Died: 22 June 2024 (aged 86)

Rafael Edri (Hebrew: רפאל אדרי; 10 September 1937 – 22 June 2024) was an Israeli businessman and politician who served as a Member of the Knesset for the Alignment and Labor Party from 1981 to 1999. He also served as Minister without Portfolio between 1988 and 1990 and briefly as Minister of the Environment in 1990.

== Life and career ==
Born in Casablanca in Morocco, Edri emigrated to Israel in 1956. In 1957, Edri became an aide to the head of the Hatzor HaGlilit local council, serving at various times as a clerk, secretary and treasurer. In 1960, Edri was conscripted into service in the Israel Defense Forces, serving for a short time near Tel Hai in the Upper Galilee.

Edri led Mapai and subsequently the Israeli Labor Party in Hazor HaGlilit through three municipal elections in 1965, 1969 and 1973. Edri lost all three elections to a coalition between Mafdal and Gahal (later Likud), but formed successive coalitions in the middle of each term, the first from March 1968 to December 1969, with support from a councillor who left Gahal, and the following two terms, from October 1972 to March 1973 and from February to May 1974, through coalitions with Mafdal and Gahal respectively. The first coalition ended after the election, while the latter two ended in the middle of the term, with Edri's coalition replaced by one between Mafdal and Gahal. Edri was not re-elected to the council in 1978, and moved to Herzliya Pituah that year.

Edri was first elected to the Knesset in 1981, and was continuously re-elected as a member of Alignment and Labor until 1999. (Note: Edri was assigned the following slots on the Alignment and Labor Party's electoral lists: 7th in 1981, 13th in 1984, 19th in 1988, 33rd in 1992 and 14th in 1996, per the Israel Democracy Institute) After the 1984 election, he became the Chairman of the Alignment parliamentary group. He also became the Chairman of the Coalition in October 1986 as part of a rotation agreement between Prime Ministers Shimon Peres and Yitzhak Shamir. Edri held the role until the 1988 election, after which he became a Minister without Portfolio in the national unity government. On 7 March 1990, Edri was appointed Minister of Environmental Protection. He resigned the post a week later after the Alignment left the coalition as a result of the dirty trick, during which Edri participated in negotiations with Shas and United Torah Judaism. He then served as a deputy Speaker of the Knesset between 1992 and 1999. Throughout his career, Edri served as a person of contact between the Israeli Government and King Hassan II of Morocco.

Edri also served in several corporate roles. He served as Chairman of the Kiryat Shmona development company for several years beginning in 1970. The company's shares were bought up by Shikun Ovdim and the Kiryat Shmona Local Council in 1973, and in early 1977, Edri became the CEO of Shikun Ovdim. In 1984, He resigned as CEO and became Chairman of the Board. In 1988, Shikun Ovdim began the process of merging with Solel Boneh, and both companies became subsidiaries of a new parent company headed by Edri. Later that year, Shikun Ovdim acquired Solel Boneh. In early 1989, after joining the Israeli Cabinet, Edri stepped down as chairman of Shikun Ovdim's board.

Edri did not seek re-election in 1999. After leaving the Knesset, he advised Togoan presidents Gnassingbé Eyadéma and Faure Gnassingbé on economic and mining affairs. In April 2005, he was nominated to chair the board of Bezeq, then a state-owned corporation. Edri was appointed to the board, but didn't become its chairman due to Bezeq's privatiztion in May.

Edri first married a Danish Jewish immigrant named Joanne. The two divorced in 1987 after it was discovered that Edri had an affair with Annie-Claude Amar, the daughter of Moroccan Jewish businessman David Amar. Edri Married Annie-Claude in 1988, and she died on 6 August 1993. Edri died on 22 June 2024, at the age of 86.
