= 1978 Israeli municipal elections =

Local elections in several municipalities and councils in Israel

Municipal elections took place in Israel on 7 November 1978 and were the first Municipal in which Mayors and Council heads, and the Councils themselves, were elected in separate elections. These were also the first elections not to occur on the same date as a legislative election, and the first elections to take place after the 1977 election, which resulted in the Likud winning a plurality of seats and forming a government for the first time.

The 1978 election was also the first in which Mayors were directly elected.

== Elections by municipality ==
In Jerusalem, Incumbent Mayor Teddy Kollek ran under an Independent list, One Jerusalem, rather than the Alignment with which he ran in 1973. He was re-elected with 62% of the vote. In the City Council, Kollek's list won 16 seats, the Likud won 5, Agudat Yisrael won 5, Mafdal won 3, and the Religious List won 2.

In Tel Aviv, Likud candidate Shlomo Lahat was elected with 58% of the vote. In the City Council, the Likud won 15 seats, the Alignment won 10, the United Religious Front (a joint list of Mafdal and Agudat Yisrael) won 6 seats and the Independent Liberal List won 2.

In Haifa, the number of seats in the City Council grew from 25 seats to 27, and Alignment candidate Aryeh Gur'el was elected Mayor, winning around half of the vote. In the City Council, Gurel's list won 11 seats, Mafdal won 3, Hadash won one, and the remaining 12 seats were divided amongst 5 local parties.

In Eilat, incumbent Mayor Gad Katz was re-elected with 58.5% of the vote. In the City Council, the Alignment won 7 seats, the Likud won 5 and Mafdal won one.

In Beersheba, incumbent Mayor Eliyahu Nawi ran under an Independent list, rather than with the Alignment, for the first time. He was re-elected with 52% of the vote, and his list won 9 out of 21 seats on the City Council.

In Givatayim, Alignment candidate Yitzhak Yaron was elected with 48% of the vote. His party won 7 out of 15 seats on the City Council.

In Herzliya, incumbent Alignment Mayor Yosef Navo was re-elected with almost 50% of the vote, while the Likud elected mayors in Kiryat Gat (with incumbent David Magen), Ramat Gan (Yisrael Peled), and Lod.

In Holon, incumbent Mayor Pinhas Eylon was re-elected with approximately two thirds of the vote. In the City Council, Eylon's list won 14 seats, the Likud won 7 seats, and Mafdal won 2.

In Kfar Saba, Alignment candidate Ze'ev Geler was elected with 67.8% of the vote. In the City Council, Geler's list won 9 seats, while the Likud and Mafdal won 3 seats each.

In Nahariya, Alignment candidate Ephraim Shrir was elected with 54% of the vote. Alignment candidates were also elected as Mayors and Heads of local councils in Nazareth-Illit (Menachem Ariev), Acre (Israel Doron), Kiryat Yam (Binyamin Avraham), Safed (Aharon Nahmias), and Petah Tikva (Dov Tavori).

In Afula, Alignment candidate Shimshon Sahuri was elected. In the City Council, Sahuri's list won 5 seats, the Likud won 4 and the United Religious List (a joint list of Mafdal and Agudat Yisrael) won 2.

In Rishon LeZion, incumbent Head of the Local Council Hananya Gibstein was re-elected.

In Ofakim, Mafdal candidate Avraham Ravivo defeated incumbent Head of the Local Council Yehiel Bentov by a 7% vote margin.

In Beit Shemesh, Likud candidate Yehuda Ben defeated incumbent Alignment Head of the Council Amram Luuk.

In Omer, incumbent Head of the Local Council Bezalel Gever was re-elected under the "Omer is Ours" list.
