= Safi, Morocco =

City in Marrakesh-Safi, Morocco

Safi آسفي (Arabic) ⴰⵙⴼⵉ (Standard Moroccan Tamazight) Asfi
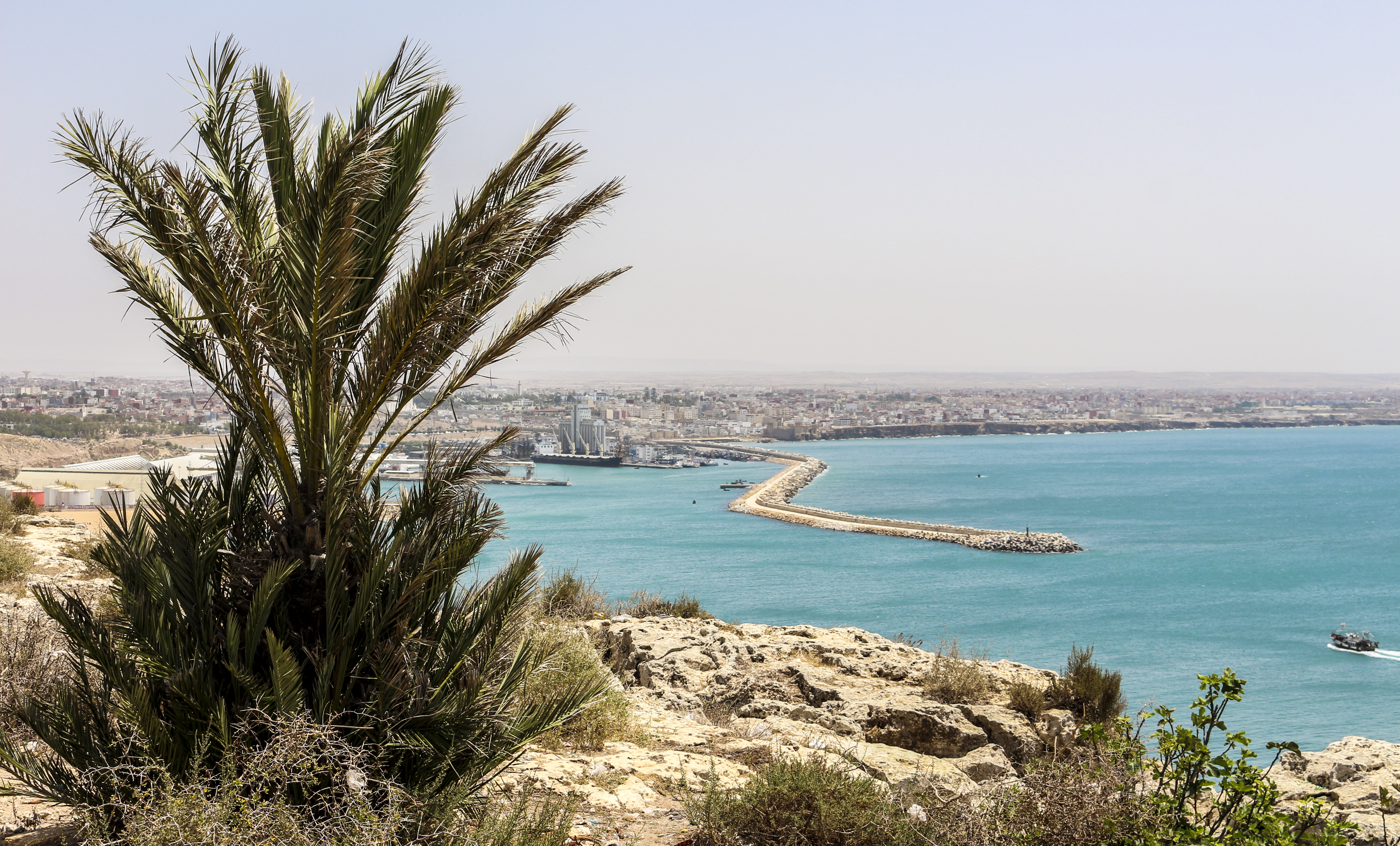
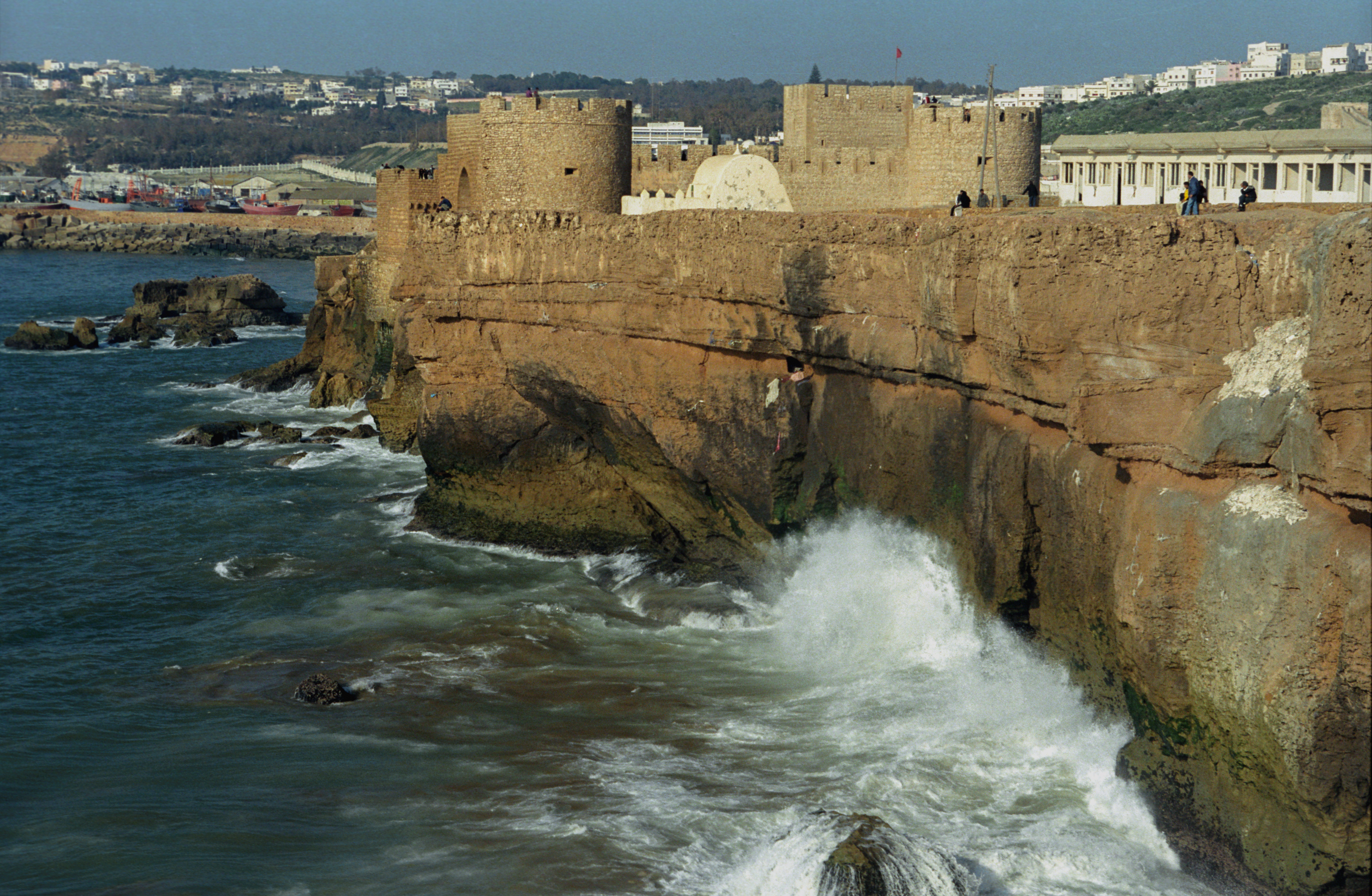

- Coat of arms
- Interactive map of Safi
- Coordinates: 32°17′N 9°14′W
- Country: Morocco
- Region: Marrakesh-Safi
- Province: Safi

Government
  - Mayor: Nourredine Kammouch (Istiqlal)

Area
  - Total: 34 km^{2} (13 sq mi)

Population (2024)
  - Total: 346,888
  - Rank: 12th in Morocco
- Demonym: Mesfioui

Safi, (Note: Arabic: آسفي, romanized: ʾāsafī; Standard Moroccan Tamazight: ⴰⵙⴼⵉ, romanized: asfi) commonly known as Asfi, is a city in western Morocco on the Atlantic Ocean. It is the capital and namesake of Safi Province. It recorded a population of 346,888 as of 2024.

Safi has some of the busiest ports in the country, handling heavy bulk cargo and energy logistics, and also serves in exporting phosphate fertilizers. The city is also known for its textile and ceramic industries.

The city was occupied by the Portuguese Empire from 1488 to 1541 and became a fortaleza of the Portuguese Crown in 1508. During the Second World War, Safi was the site of Operation Blackstone, one of the landing sites for Operation Torch.

== Etymology ==
The origin of the name Safi is likely derived from the Berber language. According to the scholar and historian Muhammad bin Ahmad al-Abdi al-Kanuni, the earliest mention of the city of Safi was in the book Geography by Claudius Ptolemy in the first section of the second part of the known world, referred to as "Taisapha." It appears that the name has Berber roots from the word "Asfo," pronounced by some as "Asfi," meaning light or bright. The city may have been named due to the lighthouses built on the shores to guide ships in their navigation.

The first mention of the city in Islamic sources is found in the book Roads and Realms by the geographer al-Bakri. He explicitly states that the name of the city Safi is derived from the Berber word "Asif," meaning a temporary watercourse. Indeed, a stream known as Wadi Shaaba still runs through the city and flows into it. Ahmad Toufiq similarly states that the name is Berber, meaning river mouth, and in the Mozabite dialect, a water basin filled by a waterwheel is called "Asfi."

Geographer Muhammad al-Idrisi records a legend of the origin of Safi's name in his book Nuzhat al-Mushtaq, also known as the Tabula Rogeriana. The story involves a group of young adventures from Lisbon called the Mugharrirûn who set out on a voyage through the Atlantic Ocean that ended with them marooned in Morocco. When local Berbers found them and explained they were a two-month voyage from home, the leader of the Mugharrirûn exclaimed "wa asfi!" ("alas!"; "oh my regret!"), and as a result the place became known as Safi.

== History ==
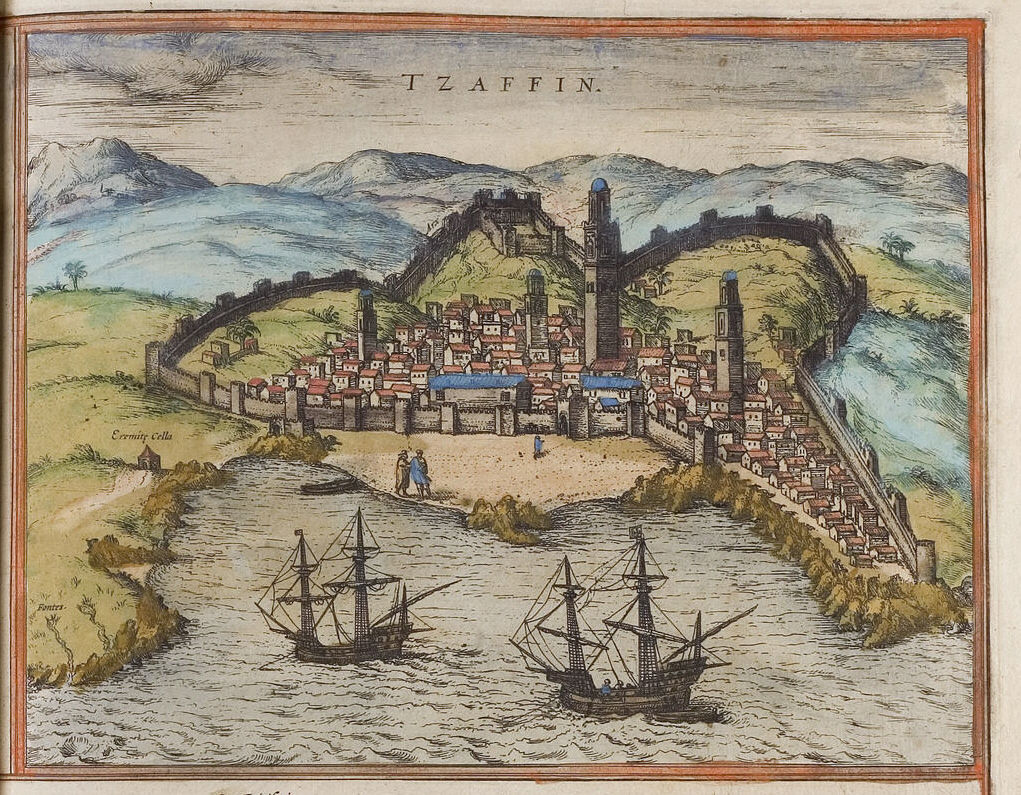
Safi (Tzaffin) in the 16th century

Kechla Fortress

Sea Castle

According to historians Henri Basset and Robert Ricard, Safi was not a very ancient city. It was mentioned in the writings of al-Bakri in the 11th century and of al-Idrisi in the 12th century. According to Moroccan historian Mohammed al-Kanuni, Safi can be identified with the ancient Thymiaterium or Carcunticus that was founded by the Carthaginian admiral Hanno during his Periplus, as related by Pliny the Elder.

Al-Idrisi mentions Safi as a busy port in the 12th century. At this time it served as a port for Marrakesh, the capital of the Almoravids and the subsequent Almohads, replacing the port of Ribat Kuz (present-day Souira Kedima) that had served as the main port for Aghmat in the previous century.

Safi was part of the Barghawata state, a confederation of Berber tribes with a distinct religious and political structure. This influential group in the region, resisted multiple invasions before eventually succumbing first to the Almoravids and then being definitively eliminated by the Almohads by 1149.

The city came under Portuguese control in 1488 and remained under Portuguese rule until 1541. The Portuguese military occupation of Safi began in 1508, and King John III decided to abandon the fortified strongholds of Safi and Azemmour in 1541 because of the pressure of the Saadian sharifs and the shortage of financial and human resources needed to defend Portuguese positions in Morocco. Surviving Portuguese-era fortifications in Safi include the Ksar el-Bahr, also known as the Sea Castle, and the Kechla Fortress..

After the Portuguese evacuation in 1541, Safi remained an important Moroccan Atlantic port. A modern historical study describes Safi in the following period as one of Morocco's safest and most easily usable ports. Its role was linked to Marrakesh, for which Safi had long served as the main port and as a point of contact for European ambassadors and traders.

Louis de Chénier, who resided in Safi in 1767 after the Franco-Moroccan peace treaty, wrote that the city had long been a centre of regular commerce with Europe and had a roadstead where ships could anchor safely, although vessels had to leave it in winter during southerly or south-westerly winds.

Bidé de Maurville a French Navy later published his account of the 1765 Larache expedition, Relation de l'affaire de Larache, in 1775. Mid-eighteenth-century sources show Safi's continuing role in European trade: a French consular letter cited in Archives marocaines stated that English and Dutch merchants carried out almost all the trade of Sainte-Croix and much of that of Safi and Salé, while French merchants did little trade there. The same survey states that the monopoly of trade in Safi and Sainte-Croix had been granted to the Danes in 1751.

After Sultan Mohammed ben Abdallah founded Mogador in 1765 as a port intended to open Morocco to foreign commerce, the new city assumed a major commercial and fiscal role. To control maritime trade, the sultan closed the southern coast to European traders and obliged European consuls at Safi, Agadir and Rabat to move to Mogador, where southern mercantile activities were concentrated. This policy reduced Safi's former role as one of Morocco's leading Atlantic trade ports.

Safi's patron saint is Abu Mohammed Salih.

During Operation Torch in World War II, American forces landed at Safi on 8 November 1942 as part of Operation Blackstone. Safi was selected because its port could receive tank-carrying vessels for the advance on Casablanca. The French garrison surrendered that afternoon, and American forces controlled the city and port eleven hours after landing.

The OCP Group, a cornerstone of Morocco's phosphate industry, established its Safi chemical complex in 1965. This site, one of the earliest in OCP’s expansion into chemical processing, significantly contributes to the local economy by processing phosphate rock sourced from Benguerir. Equipped with facilities for fertilizer production, phosphoric acid manufacturing, phosphate washing, and a sulfuric acid plant, the Safi complex is a major industrial hub. In 2016, it achieved record production levels, producing 1.5 million tonnes of phosphoric acid and 832,600 tonnes of triple superphosphate TSP fertilizer., catering to both domestic and international markets. Founded in 1920, OCP is now the world's largest fertilizer manufacturer, controlling over 70% of global phosphate reserves. It employs 23,000 people and generated $5.884 billion in 2018 revenue, emphasizing the Safi complex's significant role The company holds a 31% market share of the world phosphate product market.

== Infrastructure ==
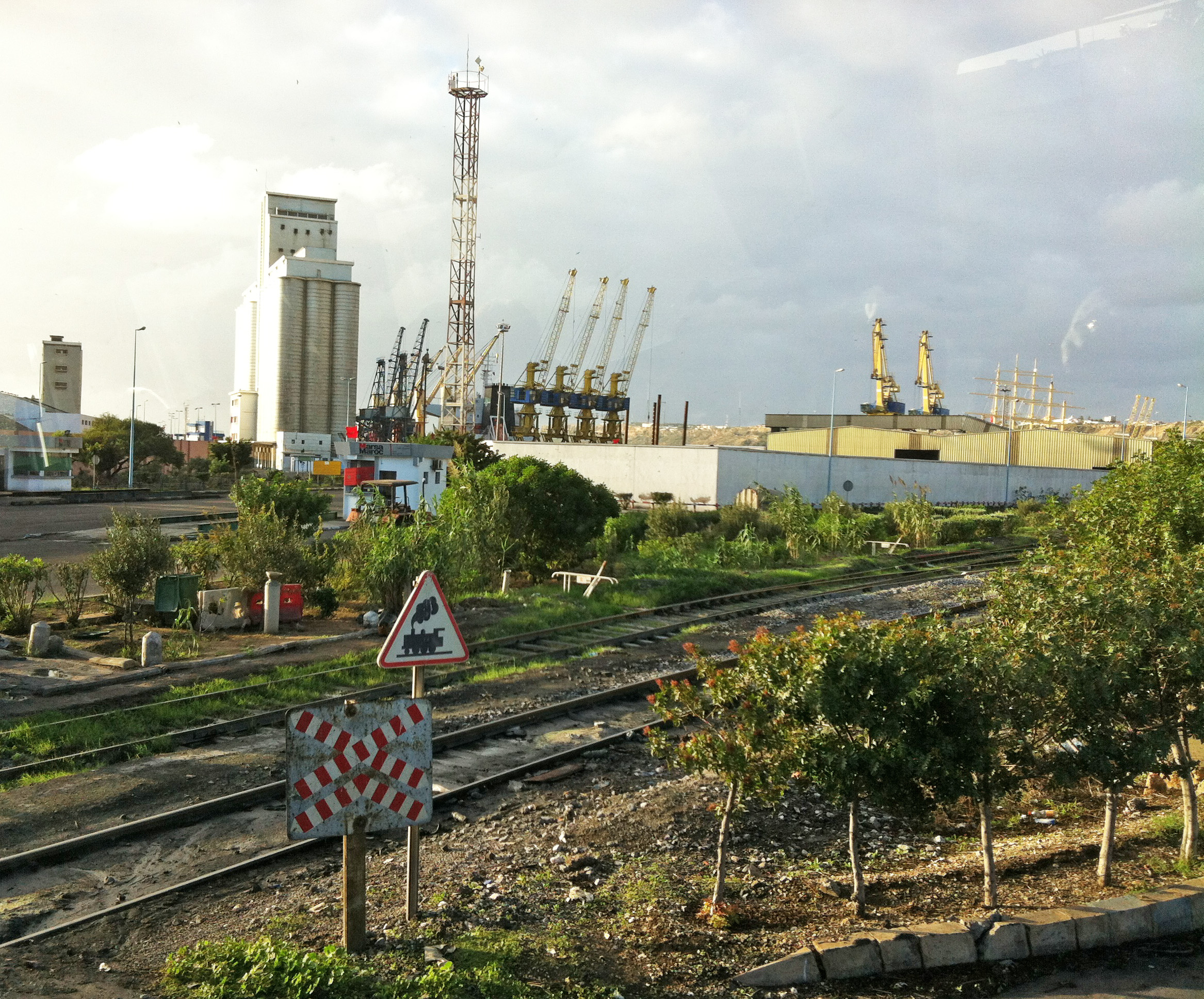
Harbour access

Safi has seen significant advancements in its infrastructure aimed at supporting its economic growth and sustainability. The Safi Industrial Port, one of the key developments, has undergone substantial expansion as part of the national port strategy to enhance Morocco's infrastructure by 2030. This expansion, which began in 2014 and was completed in 2017 by SGTM-STFA, a construction firm, included enhancements to the port's dock facilities. These improvements are essential for the new thermal power plant, which relies on coal to meet the energy demands of OCP Group. Ciments du Maroc, a subsidiary of Heidelberg Materials, supplied approximately 210,000 tonnes of marine cement for this project, underscoring its scale and impact on the local economy, particularly in the energy and chemical sectors. In addition to port development, the OCP Group is spearheading the construction of new modular seawater desalination plants. These facilities are designed to significantly increase the supply of clean drinking water to Safi and the surrounding areas. Once operational, the plants will have a total annual capacity of 110 million cubic meters, with Safi benefiting from up to 75 million cubic meters. This project is critical in providing a sustainable source of unconventional water, catering to the growing demands of the area's industrial sites and improving water availability for over 1.5 million local residents and workers.

== Climate ==
Safi has a hot semi-arid climate according to the Köppen-Geiger climate classification system, classified as BSh.

Climate data for Safi (1991–2020)
Month	Jan	Feb	Mar	Apr	May	Jun	Jul	Aug	Sep	Oct	Nov	Dec	Year
Record high °C (°F)	30.3 (86.5)	32.0 (89.6)	36.0 (96.8)	37.7 (99.9)	40.5 (104.9)	45.8 (114.4)	46.4 (115.5)	46.5 (115.7)	42.6 (108.7)	39.5 (103.1)	34.2 (93.6)	27.4 (81.3)	46.5 (115.7)
Mean daily maximum °C (°F)	18.7 (65.7)	19.6 (67.3)	21.5 (70.7)	22.5 (72.5)	24.3 (75.7)	26.1 (79.0)	29.1 (84.4)	29.3 (84.7)	27.5 (81.5)	25.5 (77.9)	22.2 (72.0)	19.9 (67.8)	23.8 (74.8)
Daily mean °C (°F)	13.3 (55.9)	14.3 (57.7)	16.2 (61.2)	17.5 (63.5)	19.7 (67.5)	22.0 (71.6)	24.5 (76.1)	24.8 (76.6)	23.0 (73.4)	20.9 (69.6)	17.2 (63.0)	14.8 (58.6)	19.0 (66.2)
Mean daily minimum °C (°F)	7.9 (46.2)	8.9 (48.0)	10.9 (51.6)	12.6 (54.7)	15.1 (59.2)	17.8 (64.0)	19.7 (67.5)	20.2 (68.4)	18.6 (65.5)	16.3 (61.3)	12.2 (54.0)	9.8 (49.6)	14.2 (57.6)
Record low °C (°F)	−2.2 (28.0)	−0.1 (31.8)	2.9 (37.2)	5.8 (42.4)	6.0 (42.8)	11.6 (52.9)	14.7 (58.5)	15.1 (59.2)	11.1 (52.0)	8.9 (48.0)	2.3 (36.1)	2.2 (36.0)	−2.2 (28.0)
Average precipitation mm (inches)	55.8 (2.20)	48.2 (1.90)	41.2 (1.62)	24.5 (0.96)	14.8 (0.58)	3.2 (0.13)	0.6 (0.02)	0.2 (0.01)	5.0 (0.20)	41.6 (1.64)	68.7 (2.70)	62.2 (2.45)	366.0 (14.41)
Average precipitation days (≥ 1.0 mm)	5.7	5.0	5.2	3.7	2.0	0.6	0.2	0.0	1.0	4.0	5.7	5.4	38.5
Mean monthly sunshine hours	219.3	211.7	258.0	284.7	318.8	303.9	320.3	306.2	267.6	246.0	220.3	208.9	3,165.7
Source 1: NCEI (sun, 1981-2010)
Source 2: NOAA

== Demographics ==
=== Languages ===
Languages spoken in Safi (2024 census)
Native languages	Percent
Arabic	98.9%
Berber languages	1.0%
Other	0.1%

According to the 2024 Moroccan census, 98.9% of the population of Safi spoke Arabic as their native language, whereas 1% spoke Berber languages natively.

=== Population ===
Historically, the population of the Safi region included both Amazigh and Arab tribal groups. Historian Yassir Benhima describes the medieval population of the region as originally Amazigh, and notes the gradual settlement of Arab tribal groups from the late 12th century. Early 16th-century Portuguese records also mention the Arabs of the Abda in Safi's hinterland.

Safi also had an important Jewish community. On the eve of World War I, the city had approximately 2,500 Jewish inhabitants out of no more than 25,000 people. The community numbered more than 3,600 in 1936 and about 4,500 in 1951, before declining after Moroccan independence because of emigration to Europe, Canada and Israel.

== Economy ==
Lalla Fatna beach

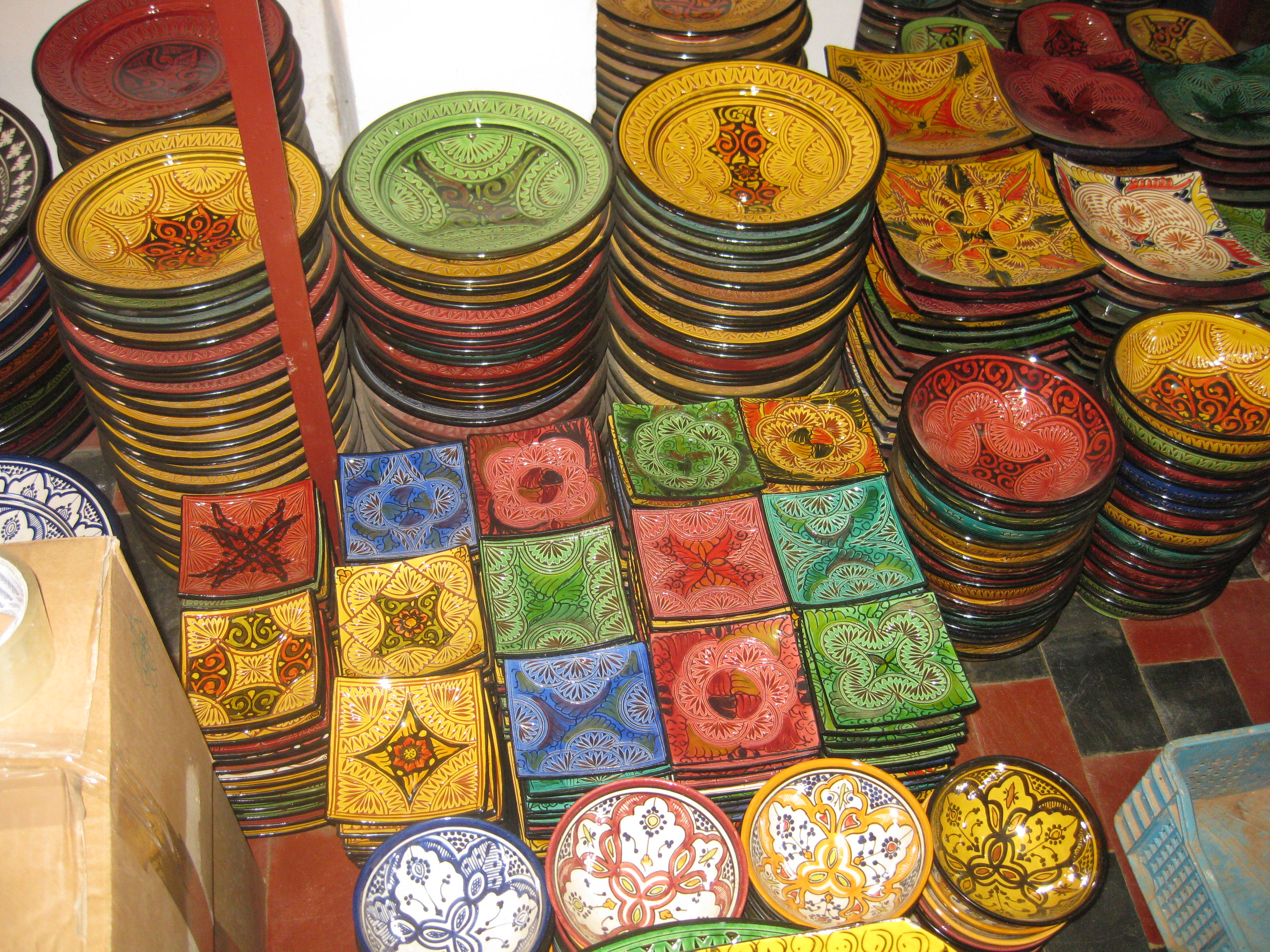
Pottery from Safi

Typical Asfi Ka'ak

Safi serves as a key maritime and industrial logistics hub in Morocco, operating through two main facilities: the historic port of Safi, Safi Ville, and the newer deep-water port, Safi Atlantique. In 2025, the combined traffic across both ports reached 10.593 million tonnes, a 6% overall increase compared to 2024, accounting for approximately 10.3% of the total volume handled by the National Ports Agency (ANP). While Safi Ville handles the majority of regional traffic (7.549 million tonnes in 2025), Safi Atlantique has experienced accelerated growth, handling 3.044 million tonnes (+13.9% year-on-year) as heavy industrial and bulk shipping increasingly shift toward newer deep-water facilities. The port complex mainly serves regional industrial activities, including minerals, energy products, construction materials, and industrial exports.

Morocco is the world's top exporter of Canned Sardines, with Safi, alongside Agadir and Laayoune making up the bulk of production. Key initiatives to modernize the city's fishing and industrial infrastructure include upgrading the local fleet with modern detection technologies to optimize catch volumes while limiting overfishing, as well as expanding social and healthcare coverage for local fishermen. To increase value addition, processing plants expanded to produce secondary derivatives such as fish oils and fishmeal alongside traditional canning. Further initiatives emphasize resource conservation through strict compliance with biological resting periods, enhanced oversight against illegal fishing, specialized technical training centers, and commercial promotion under a protected Sardine d'Asfi regional label.

In the early 20th century, the Moroccan potter Boujemâa Lamali established a pottery school in Safi, supported by the colonial administration. Since then pottery has been a mainstay of Safi's economy. Prior to the COVID-19 pandemic there were 2,000 registered artisans working in the city's 212 workshops, and thousands more unregistered artisans.

== Sport ==
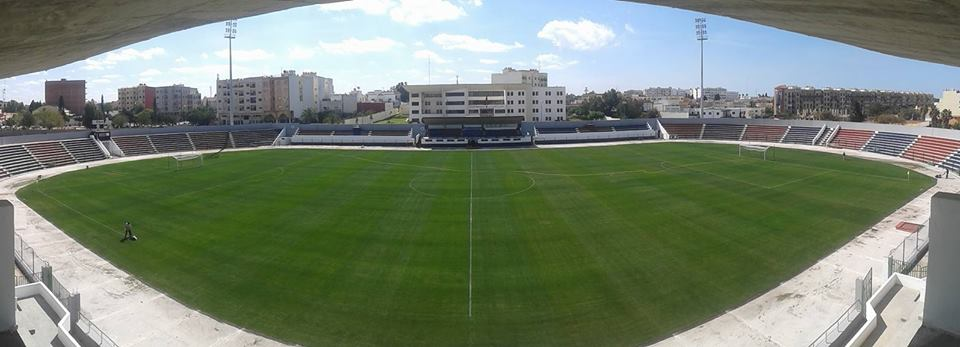
El Massira Stadium

Football, rugby union and tennis are represented in Safi. The city's main football club is Olympic Club Safi, which returned to Morocco's top division for the 2004–05 season after winning promotion in 2004. The city's rugby side, Olympique de Safi, has won the Moroccan rugby Coupe du Trône more than once, including the 2005–06 title; Le Matin also noted that the club had won both the cup and the national championship the previous season. Safi also has an affiliated tennis club, the Tennis Association de Safi, listed by the Royal Moroccan Tennis Federation.

== Notable people ==
- Meir Ben-Shabbat, Israel's National Security Adviser and Chief of Staff for National Security
- Edmond Amran El Maleh, writer
- Mohamed Bajeddoub, Andalusian classical music singer
- Mohamed Benhima, politician, former Prime Minister of Morocco
- Brahim Boulami, athlete
- Khalid Boulami, athlete
- Driss Benhima, CEO of Royal Air Maroc and president of Hawd Assafi, Safi-based non-profit organization
- Samy Elmaghribi, Moroccan musician
- Shayfeen, hip-hop duo
- Michel Galabru, French actor
- Abderrahim Goumri, long-distance runner
- Zakaria El Masbahi, basketball player
- Haja Hamounia, traditional chanteuse of Bedouin song
- Mohamed Mjid, former longtime president of the Royal Moroccan Tennis Federation
- Aharon Nahmias, Israeli politician
- Abu Mohammed Salih, 12th century religious leader
- Mohamed Reggab, film director
- Uri Sebag, Israeli politician
- Abraham Ben Zmirro, 15th century rabbi
- Abderrazak Hamdallah, footballer
- Yahia Attiyat Allah, footballer
- Yassin Adnan, writer and broadcaster
- Ihab Amir, singer, songwriter and actor
- Sion Assidon, human rights activist
- Monique Barbut, French public servant and former Executive Secretary of the United Nations Convention to Combat Desertification
- Ahmed Boukhari, former Moroccan intelligence officer and author
- Esther Galil, Israeli-French singer-songwriter and painter
- Abderrahim Elkhassar, poet
- Rashid Ramzi, middle-distance runner
- Soulaima Gourani, Danish-Moroccan business executive and writer
- Shobee, rapper, songwriter and music producer

== Gallery ==
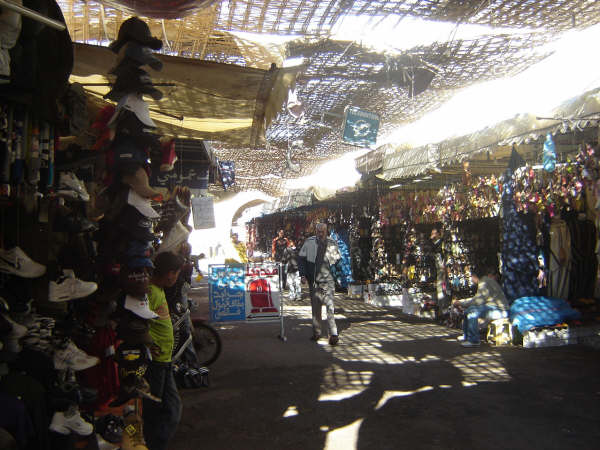

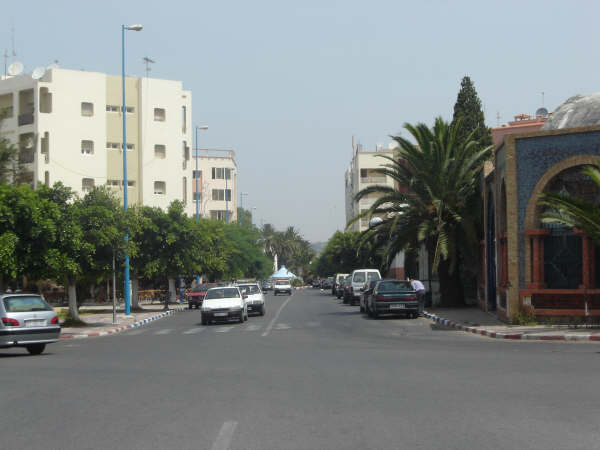

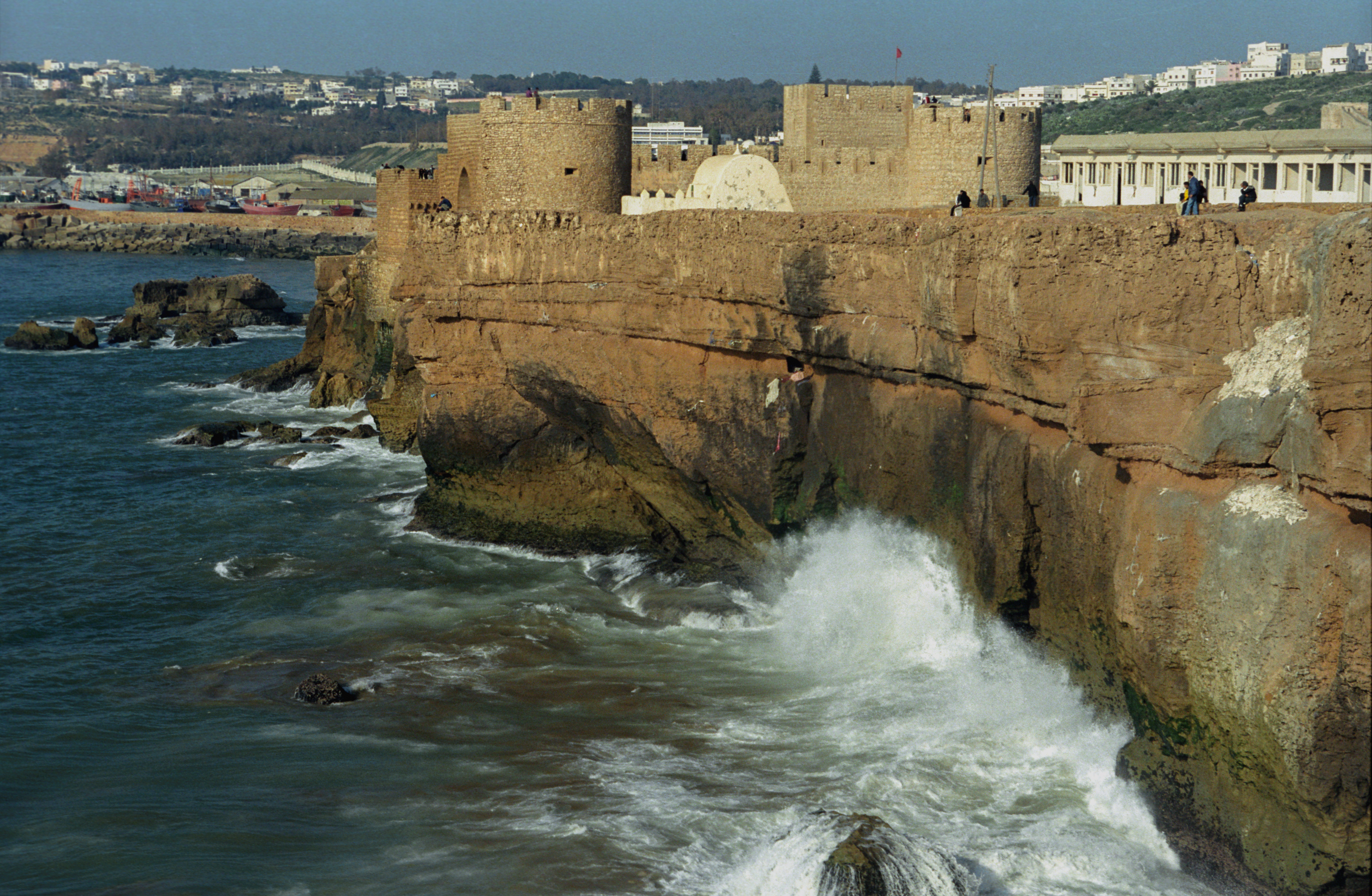
Sea Castle (Safi)

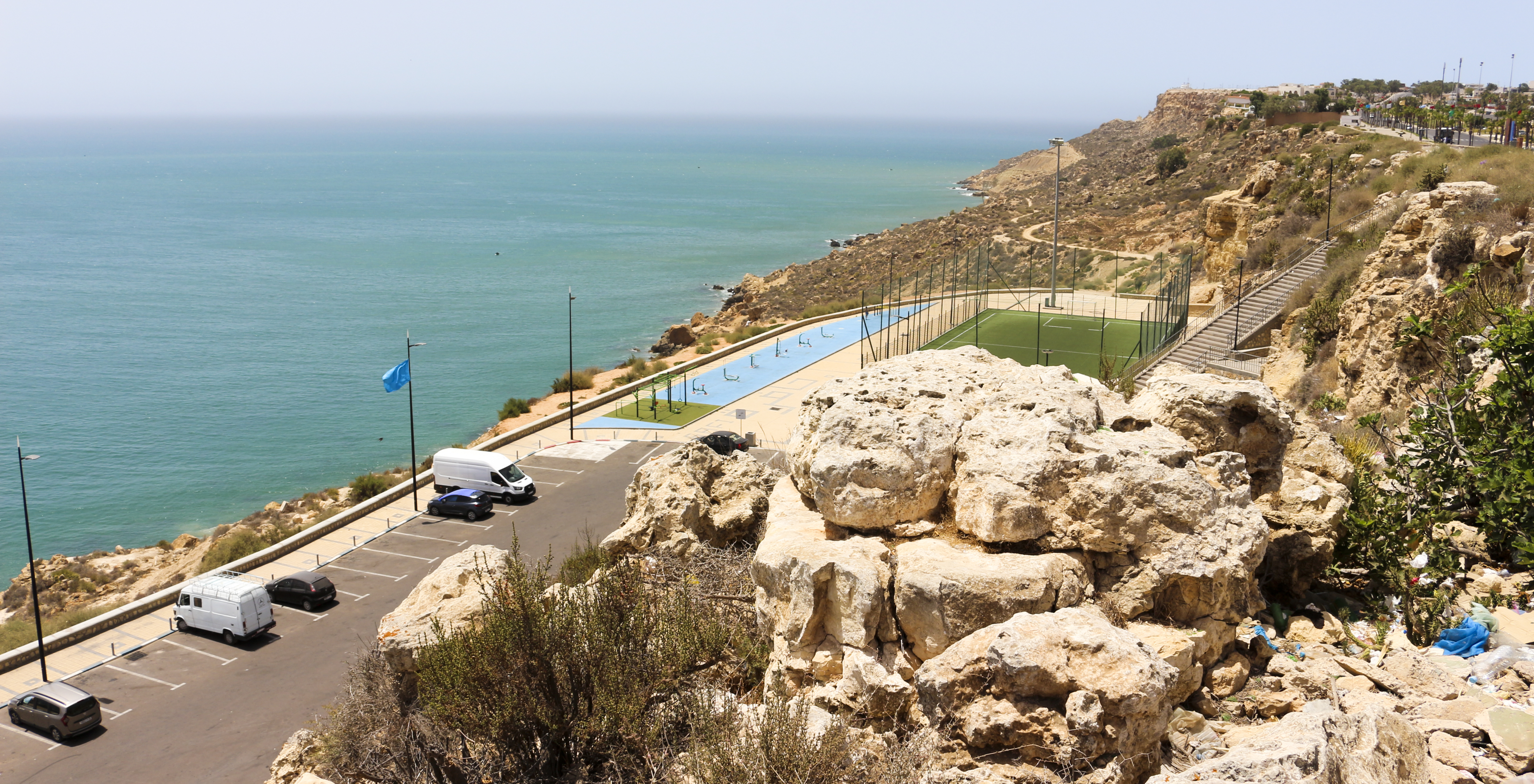

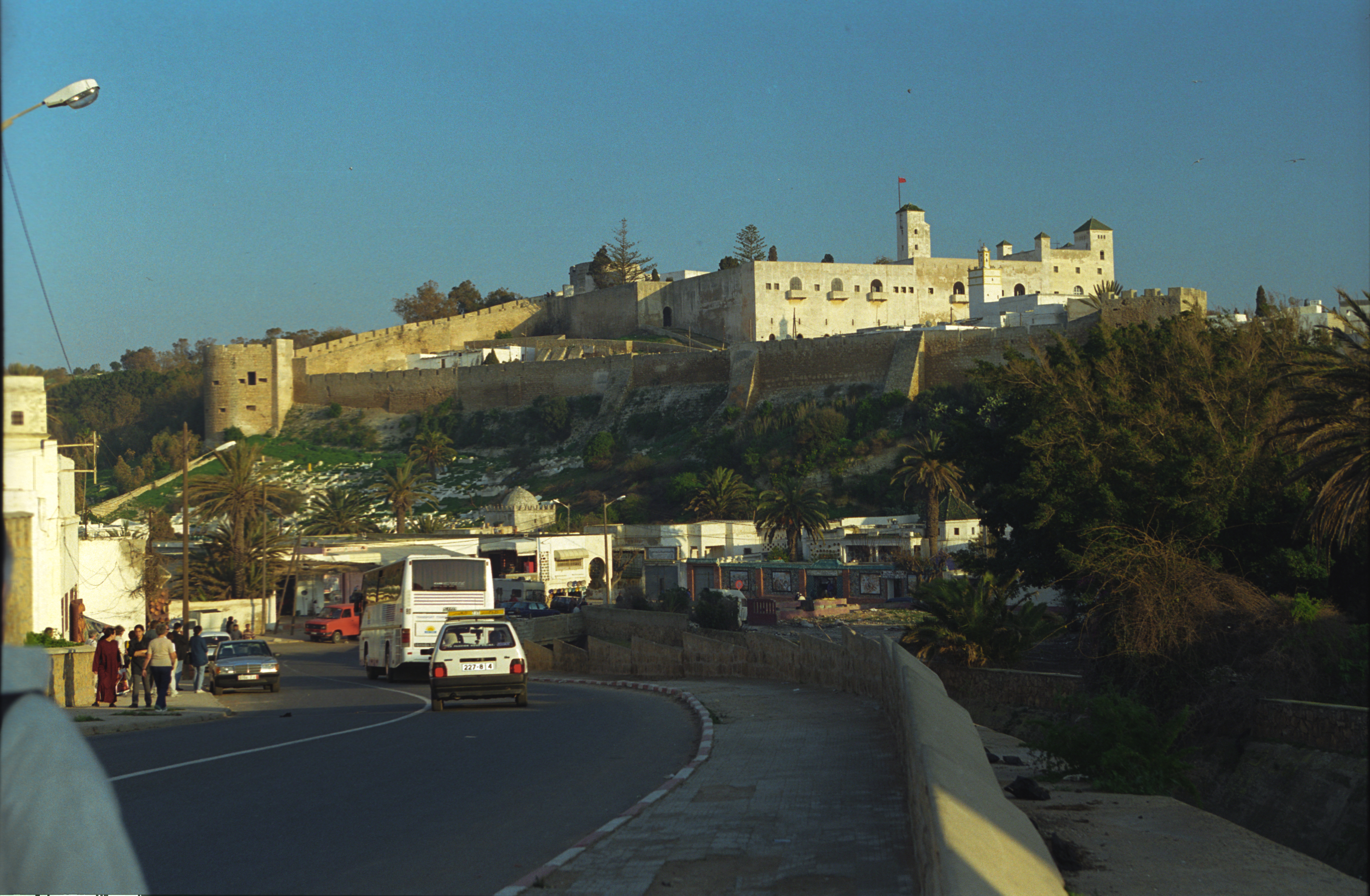

Tajine memorial
