= Tzuf Dvash Synagogue =

Sephardic synagogue in Jerusalem

- Location of the synagogue in Old Jerusalem

Religion
- Affiliation: Judaism
- Rite: Nusach Sefard
- Ecclesiastical or organizational status: Synagogue
- Status: Active

Location
- Location: 15 Plugat ha-Kotel Street, Jewish Quarter, Old City of Jerusalem
- Interactive map of Tzuf Dvash Synagogue
- Coordinates: 31°46′34″N 35°13′54″E

Architecture
- Type: Synagogue architecture
- Style: Traditional Spanish North-African
- Completed: 1860

The Tzuf Dvash Synagogue is a synagogue, located at 15 Plugat ha-Kotel Street in the Jewish Quarter of the Old City of Jerusalem. The congregation was founded in 1860 under Ottoman Empire rule and worships in the Sephardic rite.

== History ==
The synagogue is named after Rabbi David ben Shimon, (acronym D-b-Sh, Hebrew: דבש), who arrived in the Land of Israel from Morocco in 1854 and founded Machane Yisrael, one of the first neighborhoods outside of the Old City walls.

During the 19th century, a greater number of Jews arrived in Jerusalem from the North African countries. Through Ben Shimon's influence, the group broke off from the greater Sephardic community of Jerusalem and established the Westerners' Synagogue (as opposed to the Eastern Mizrahi Jews) in 1860. The building also contained the community's Talmud Torah and an old age home.

The community's property register, which was written after Ben Shimon's death in 1879, listed a yard with two synagogues, with the Ben Tzuf synagogue described as the "large and special one." The register adds that people would rise each midnight to study at the synagogue. The upper floor contained the Talmud Torah, which consisted of three rooms. The lower floor housed the meeting room of the community council, as well as two small rooms in which lived the widows who cleaned the yard.

After the 1948 war, the building was under Jordanian rule, along with the entire Old City of Jerusalem. Though the building was looted, it remained standing. After the Six-Day War, the building was refurbished and in 1980 it was restored as a house of prayer.

The domed rooms were rededicated in 1988 by the French community. The building also serves as a yeshiva.

== See also ==
- History of the Jews in Israel
- List of synagogues in Israel
- Synagogues of Jerusalem
- Yosef Yitzchak Shloush
