= Kechla Fortress =

Fortress in Safi

Coordinates: 32°17′56.9″N 9°14′13.1″W

- Dar Sultan
- Part of Safi's Old Medina
- Safi, Morocco
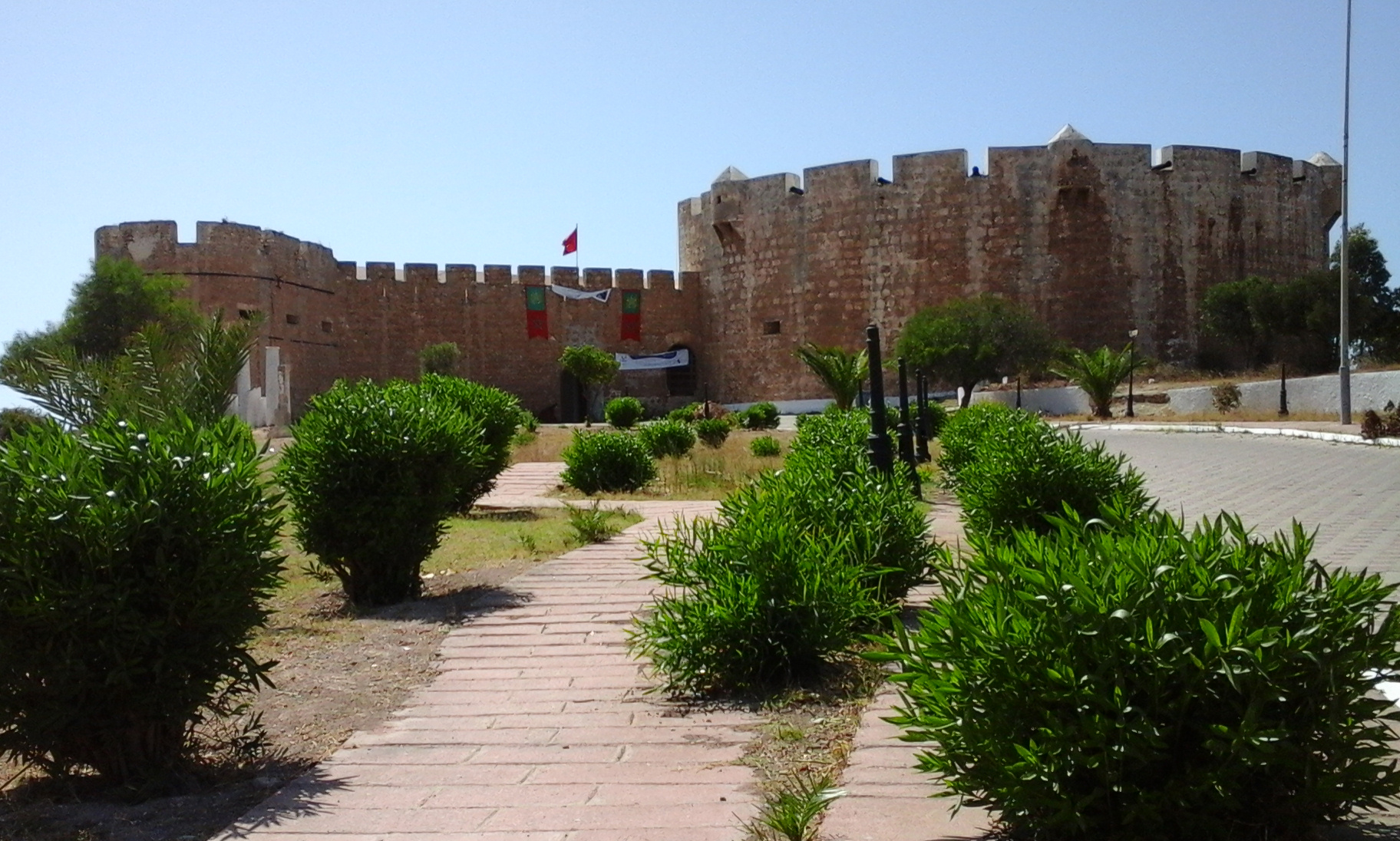

Site information
- Type: Fortress
- Controlled by: Almohad Caliphate (12th century); Portuguese Empire (16 century); Alaouite Dynasty (after 18th century)

Site history
- Built: 12th and 16th century

The Kechla Fortress, also known as Dar Sultan, is a 12th and 16th century fortress in Safi, Morocco. It is integrated into the landward side of Safi's old medina, and it historically defended Safi's inland approaches. The Kechla Fortress and Safi's seaward fortress form a system of fortifications in Safi.

== Description ==
Fortifications around Safi's medina date to the 12th century of the Almohad Caliphate. In 1488, the Portuguese Empire arrived and began to consolidate power in the city by the early 16th century. The Portuguese reinforced the medina and landward facing defences, notably by adding a large casemate for cannons. These fortifications feature carved Portuguese arms and resemble elements of the fortifications in Tangier. By the 18th century, Hisham bin Mohammed of the Alaouite Dynasty took control of the fortress. The Kechla fortress contains palatial residences that date to the 18th century.

== Gallery ==
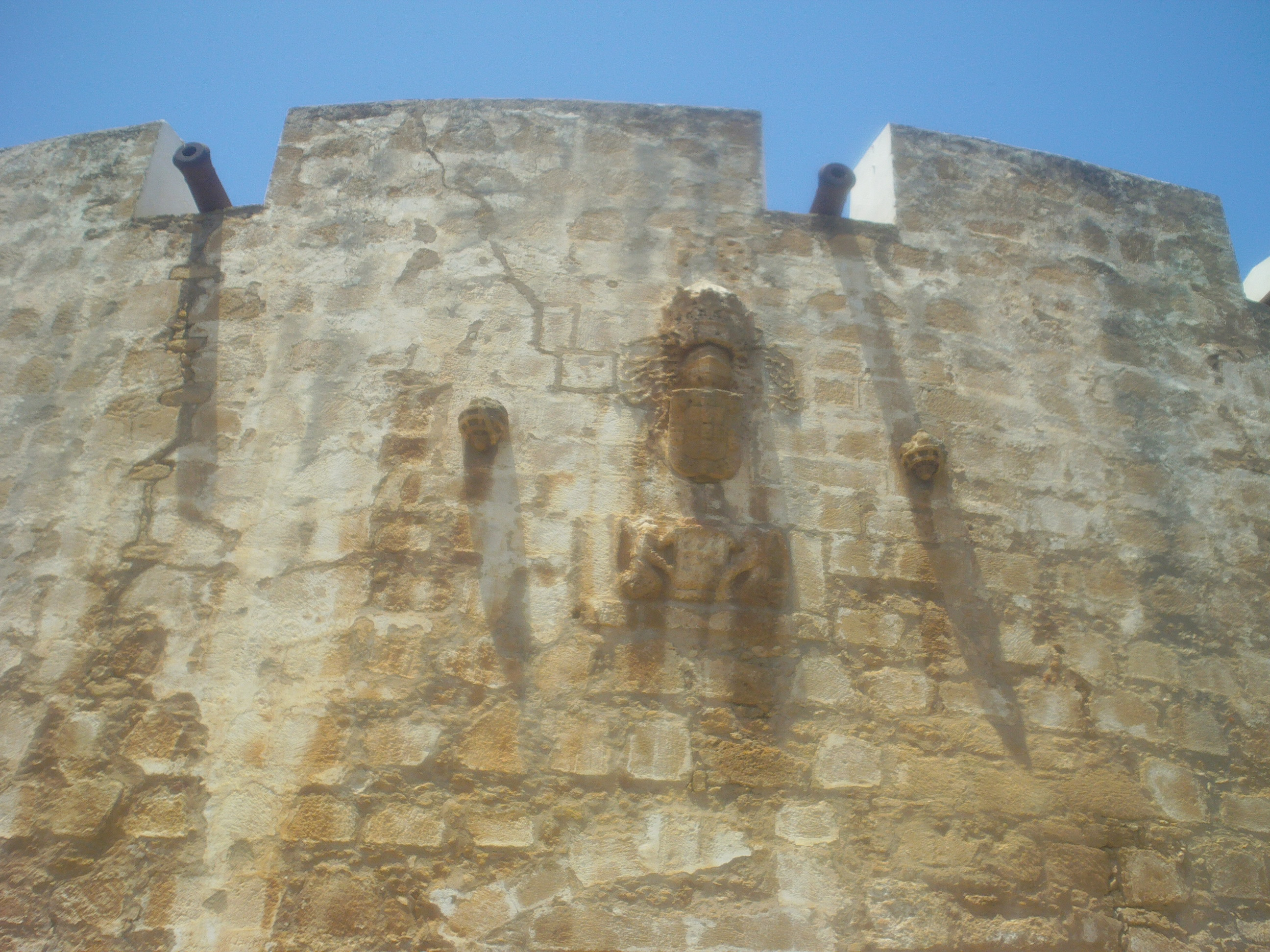
Heraldic arms

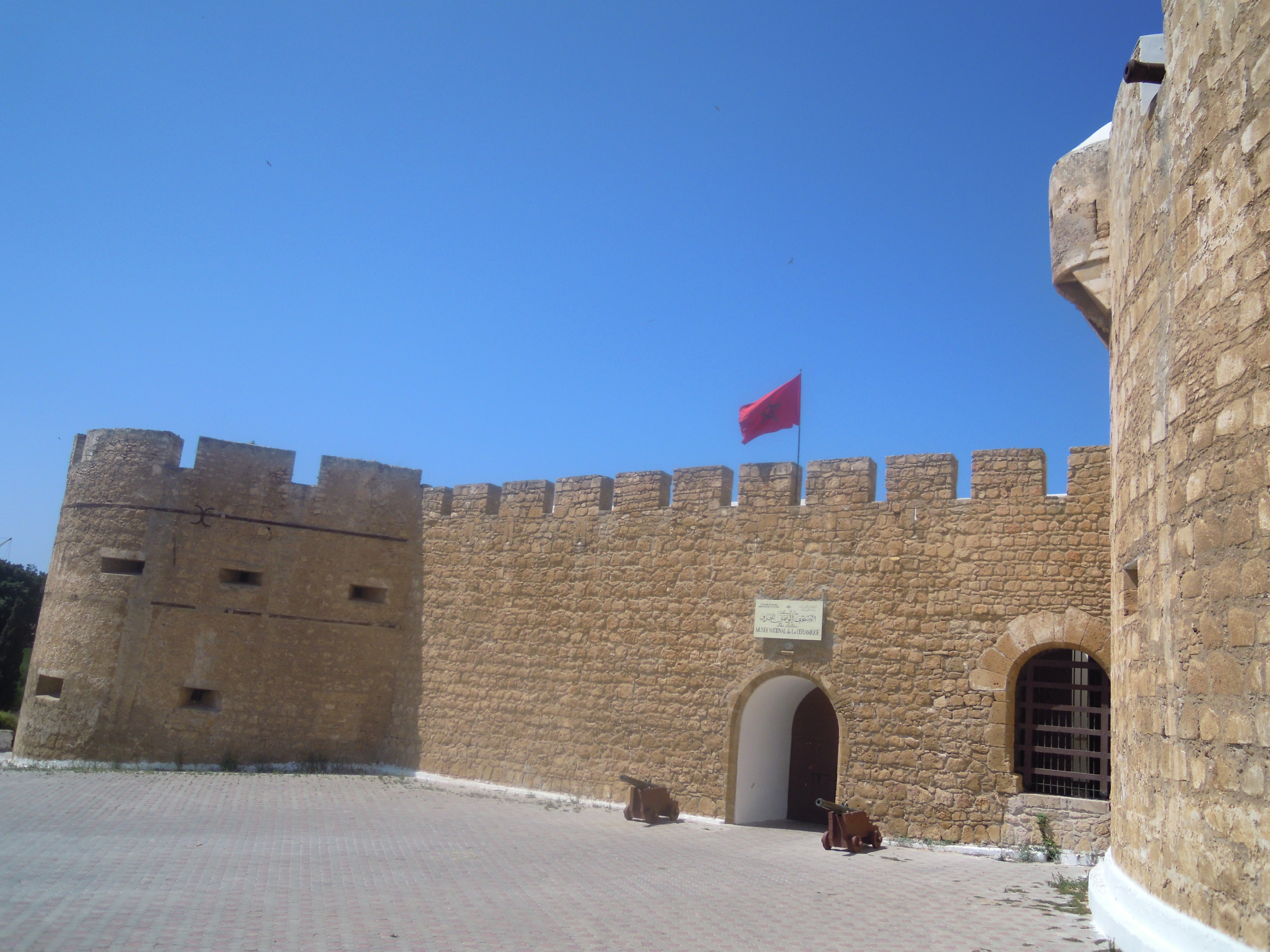
Entryway with old museum signage

== See also ==
- Portuguese colonial architecture
