= David ben Shimon =

Moroccan rabbi (1826–1879)

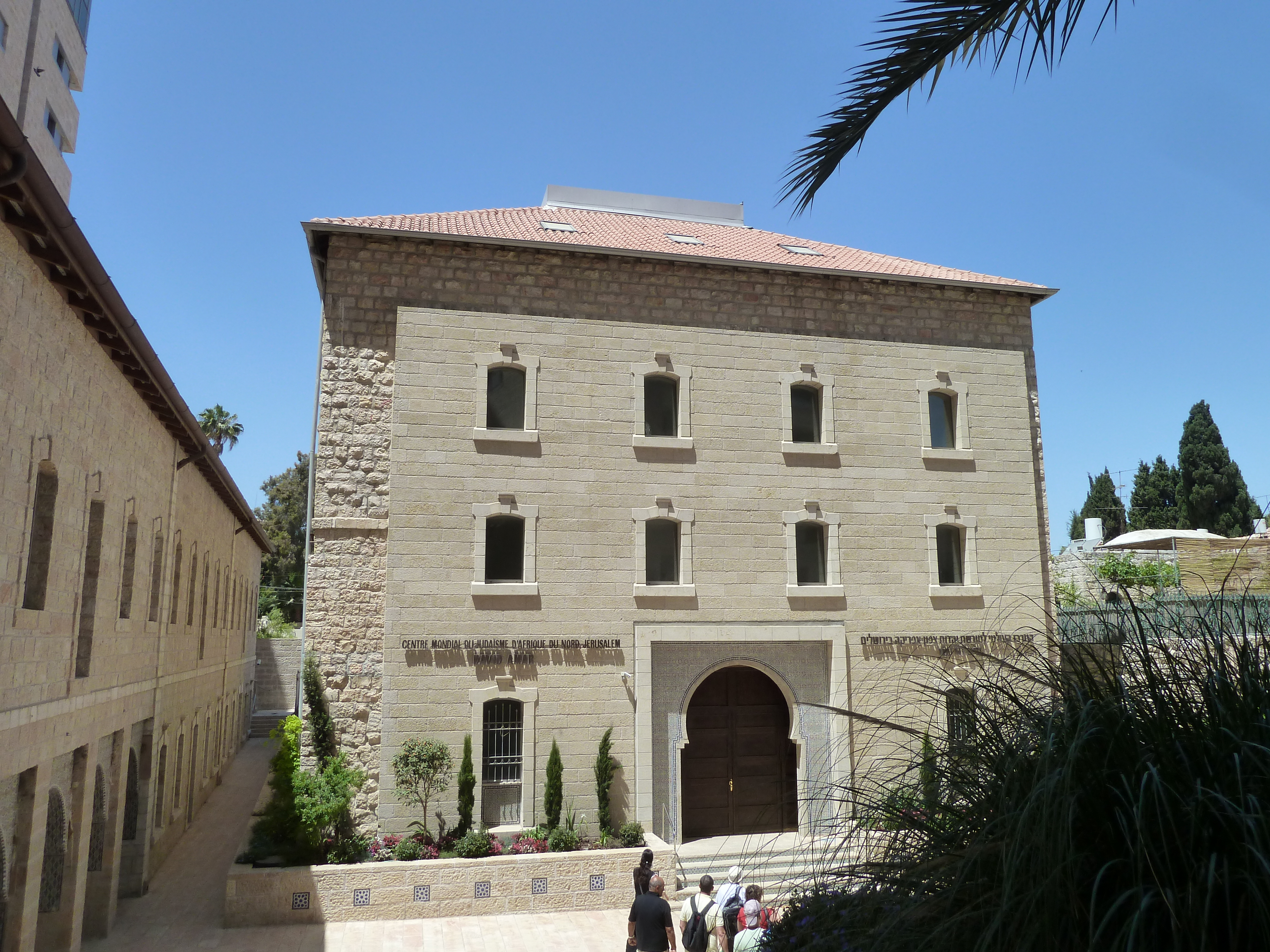
- Building in Mahane Israel, now the North Africa Jewish Heritage Center.

Personal life
- Born: 1826 Rabat, Morocco
- Died: 5 December 1879 (aged 52–53) Jerusalem, Ottoman Empire
- Children: Raphael Harun ben Shimon (1848–1928); Mas'ud ben Shimon (1869–1925).

Religious life
- Religion: Judaism

David ben Shimon (Hebrew: דוד בן שמעון, Arabic: داود بن شمعون) also known as Tzuf Devash and the Radvash (1826 – 5 December 1879) was a rabbi who headed the North African Jewish community of Jerusalem in the Old Yishuv. Ben Shimon established Mahane Israel, one of the early neighborhoods outside the Old City walls.

== Biography ==
David ben Shimon was the son of a wealthy merchant in Morocco. He married Rachel, the daughter of Rabbi Masoud Tsabbach, and one of their children was Rabbi Rafael Aharon. In 1854, at the age of twenty-eight, he moved to Jerusalem with several of his disciples and soon became a leader of the Moroccan Jewish community.

== Rabbinic career ==
In Jerusalem, he attracted increasing numbers of followers. He established the Tzuf Dvash Synagogue in 1860, and participated in the establishment of Mishkenot Shaananim. Relations with the Sephardi community, which ruled Jerusalem, became strained, as he felt they tried to master him. He decided to establish a community of his own, "Edah HaMaaravit B'Yerushalayim". Together with his followers, he settled in 1867 on a lot he had purchased outside the walls of the Old City, Mahane Israel. Two synagogues, several Batei Medrash (houses of study), and other institutions were built there. His Moroccan followers were soon followed by Jews from other North African countries, who wished to break away from the Sephardi yoke. The community was the first to break off from the direct supervision of the Sephardic umbrella organization "Ha'Edah HaSfaradit B'Yerushalayim".

He sent meshulachim (fundraisers for charity in the Holy land) to Jewish communities in Islamic countries, and used the money to aid the needy, as well as to build the institutions of his community. He opened a meat store where he would distribute meat to the poor, and he took care of widows and orphans. He reported all donations and expenses in the newsletter Havatzelet.

Ben Shimon served as Rosh Yeshiva, rabbi and posek, and gave halachic rulings in his Beth Din. His reputation drew crowds from outside his community to hear him and study with him. The first six years, he was the leader at large for his community; thereafter he appointed a committee of seven rabbis who would assist him in leading the community. Sir Moses Montefiore also greatly assisted the community.

== Descendants ==
His son Raphael Harun ben Shimon (רפאל אהרן בן שמעון, روفائيل هارون بن شمعون, 1848–1928) was Hakham Bashi of the Jewish Community in Egypt, as was another son of his Mas'ud ben Shimon (מסעוד חי בן שמעון, مسعود حاي بن شمعون, 1869–1925).

== Published works ==
Ben Shimon planned a series of books about the Holy Land by the name of Shaarei Tzedek. In 1862 he published the first volume, Shaar Hachatzer a collection of commentaries of the Sages regarding the Holy Land, supplemented with his own commentaries. The second volume was published posthumously: Shaar Hamatarah on the laws of the land. The third book, Shaar Hakadim, with introductions about matters pertaining to Eretz Yisrael, was never printed. Shaar Hamifkad on the special traditions of the land was edited by the author's son Rabbi Rafael Aharon and was published in Egypt in 1908. Shaar Takdim is about the commandments of the land and Shaarei Tehilah contains prayers and songs for special occasions. Rabbi David's responsa were included in a book by his son named Umitzur Devash. The divorce cases in which Rabbi David was involved are summarized in the book Shem Chadash, by his youngest son Rabbi Masoud. This book also includes the poetry written by Rabbi David, under the name "Shir Chadash."
