= Babylonian Jewry Heritage Center =

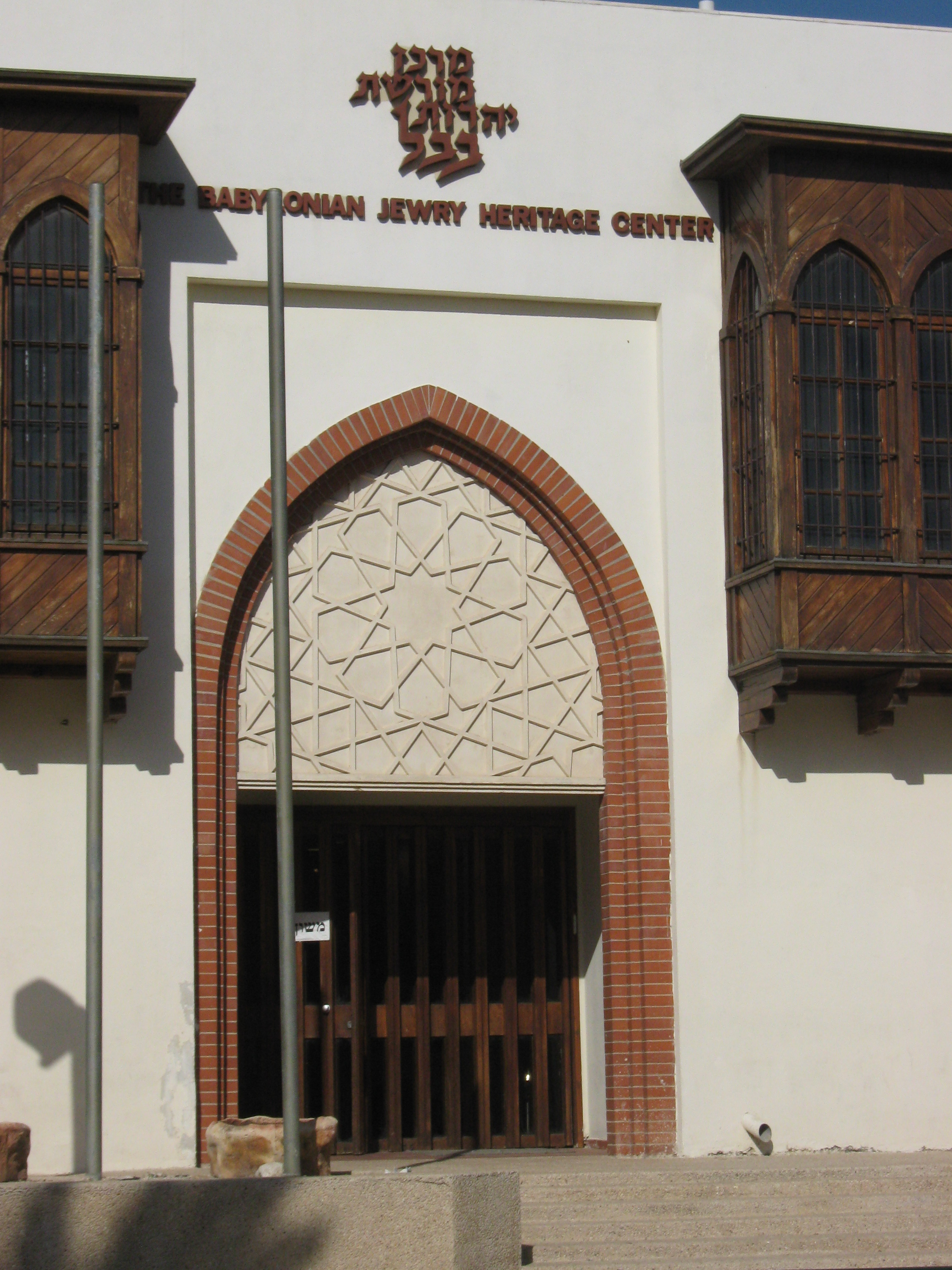
Babylonian Jewry Heritage Center, Or Yehuda Israel

Babylonian Jewry Heritage Center (Hebrew: מרכז מורשת יהדות בבל) is a museum and research center in Or Yehuda, Israel.

== History ==
The Babylonian Jewry Heritage Center was founded in 1973 as a non-profit institution for the purpose of collecting, preserving and commemorating the heritage of Babylonian Jewry. The center operates a research institute, publishing house, library and archives.

The center's Museum of Babylonian Jewry opened to the public in 1988. It presents permanent and changing exhibitions.

== Center's divisions ==
The historic wing shows the history of Babylonian Jewry. The Ethnographic Division presents the way of life, the customs, and material culture. This division also collects items and clothes of Iraqi Jewry for preservation and documentation purposes. The Plastic Arts Gallery displays changing exhibitions that present the heritage and culture of the Jews of Babylon (present-day Iraq).

== Museum of Babylonian Jewry ==
The center also has the Babylonian Jewry Museum which was opened to the public in 1988. The museum presents various artifacts, ranging from pictures to historical artefacts of Iraqi immigrants to Israel. The museum visitors are able to learn the chapters of the history of the Babylonian Jewry and their generations of over 2600 years.

Through the permanent exhibitions, the contribution of the spiritual leadership of the great yeshivas and the physical leadership of the Exilarchs' leadership to the existence of the Jewish people, as well as the community's relations with the government and the surrounding society during the different periods, are shown. The museum's exhibits draw a spotlight on the various communities that make up Babylonian Jewry and the transformations that have taken place over the past centuries, as well as on the independent institutions they established.

The museum has estimated that, in addition to the 180 Jews listed as victims of the antisemitic Farhud pogrom in Iraq in June 1941, there were another 600 Jewish victims buried in a mass grave.

The museum has special exhibitions dedicated to the major events in the lives of Iraqi Jews in the 20th century; 1941 Farhud, The establishment of the Zionist movement openly and in underground and the mass immigration and integration into the State of Israel.

The museum also organizes classes for the youth on poetry and dance of the heritage of Babylonian Jewry in order to endow the younger generation the values of the Babylonian Jewry's heritage.

The museum's structure was designed around the traditional Jewish home motif in Iraq, with its inner courtyard at its heart. In addition, an alleyway in the Jewish Quarter and the Great Synagogue in Baghdad were restored.

== See also ==
- North Africa Jewish Heritage Center
