= Mohamed Mjid =

Moroccan activist

Mohamed Mjid محمد امجيد

President of the Royal Moroccan Tennis Federation
- In office 1964–2009
- Succeeded by: Fayçal Laraichi

Safi MP
- In office 1977–1992

Personal details
- Born: April 14, 1916 Safi, Morocco
- Died: 20 March 2014 (aged 97) Rabat
- Political party: National Rally of Independents

Mohamed Mjid (Arabic: محمد امجيد; 1916–20 March 2014) was a Moroccan politician and president of the Royal Moroccan Tennis Federation.

== Life ==
In his youth, Mohamed Mjid was a militant in the national movement for the independence of Morocco, activities for which he was arrested and imprisoned. After Morocco gained independence, Mjid became active in politics and NGOs. In 1964, he was appointed as the president of the national Tennis Federation, a position he held until 2009. He was also elected as an MP for Safi as part of the National Rally of Independents.

On 20 March 2014, Mjid died in a hospital in Rabat and was buried in Casablanca. His funerals were attended by high-profile personalities such as Fouad Ali El Himma and Prince Rachid, the brother of Mohammed VI.
