= Yitzhak Yaakov =

Israeli general (1926–2013)

Brigadier General Yitzhak Yaakov
- יצחק (יצה) יעקב
- Yitzhak Yaakov in 1948
- Born: Yitzhak Jacobson (יצחק יעקובסון); 24 March 1926; Tel Aviv, Palestine (Eretz Israel), British Empire
- Died: 25 March 2013 (aged 87); Tel Aviv-Yafo, Israel
- Other name: Yicha / Ya'tza (יצה)
- Notable work: 2011 memoir
- Military career
- Allegiance: Palmach (until 1948); State of Israel
- Service years: Palmach: c. 1944–1948 (Note: From age 18 until shortly after the War of Independence.); Sixth Battalion; (Israel) IDF: 1955–1974; Sayeret Matkal
- Rank: Brigadier General
- Conflicts: Pre-state actions; Night of the Bridges; Israeli War of Independence; The Convoy of Ten; Six-Day War; Operation Doomsday
- Prosecution
- Citizenship: Israeli
- Occupation: Retired brigadier general
- Penalty: Suspended sentence
- Accomplice: Ronen Bergman

Details
- Date apprehended: 28 March 2001

Brigadier General Yitzhak Yaakov (Hebrew: יצחק יעקב, nicknamed Hebrew: יצה, romanized: Yicha or Ya'tza) (Note: Hebrew: יצחק (יצה) יעקב is Romanised: 'Yitzhak "Yicha" Yaakov' by Haaretz, 'Yitzhak "Ya'tza" Ya'akov' by the Wilson Center, and 'Itzhak Yaakov' by the The New York Times.)

== Early life ==
Yitzhak Yaakov was born on 24 March 1926 in Tel Aviv in British-controlled Palestine. He joined the Palmach at age 18 in 1944. On the Night of the Bridges he was a machine gunner at the Gaza Bridge. During the Israeli War of Independence he took part in the The Convoy of Ten. In 1961 the IDF sent him for advanced studies abroad.

Military parade at Mahane Israel, left to right: Yitzhak Yaakov, Zvika Zamir, and Yaakov Hefetz.

Harel Brigade - Sixth Battalion, left to right: Yaakov Hefetz, Yitzhak Yaakov, Giora Zibner, Eliezer Lusik Henn, and Zvi Zamir.

== Six-Day War ==
Yaakov was involved in the first deployment of Israel's nuclear weapons. Israel is believed to have begun full-scale production of nuclear weapons following the 1967 Six-Day War, although it had built its first operational nuclear weapon by December 1966. A Central Intelligence Agency (CIA) report from early 1967 stated that Israel had the materials to construct a bomb in six to eight weeks and some authors suggest that Israel had two crude bombs ready for use during the war. According to US journalist Seymour Hersh, everything was ready for production at this time save an official order to do so. Israel crossed the nuclear threshold on the eve of the Six-Day War in May 1967. "[Prime Minister] Eshkol, according to a number of Israeli sources, secretly ordered the Dimona [nuclear reactor] scientists to assemble two crude nuclear devices. He placed them under the command of Brigadier General Yitzhak Yaakov, the chief of research and development in Israel's Defense Ministry. The crude atomic bombs were readied for deployment on trucks that could race to the Egyptian border for detonation in the event Arab forces overwhelmed Israeli defenses". Spider (Hebrew: עכביש) was the name for the devices. The name for the plan was Operation Shimshon (Hebrew: מבצע שמשון), named after the death of Samson in Judges 16:30. It was also referred to as Operation Samson, codename "Samson" (Hebrew: שם הקוד "שמשון"), or (Hebrew: מבצע שמשון, romanized: Mivtza Shimshon). General Yaakov also sometimes called the plan Operation Doomsday. (Hebrew: מבצע יום הדין, romanized: Mivtza Yum Hadin).

In an article titled "Last Secret of the Six-Day War" The New York Times reported that in the days before the 1967 Six-Day War Israel planned to insert a team of paratroopers by helicopter into the Sinai. Their mission was to set up and remotely detonate a nuclear bomb on a mountaintop as a warning to belligerent surrounding states. While outnumbered, Israel effectively eliminated the Egyptian Air Force and occupied the Sinai, winning the war before the test could even be set up. Yaakov referred to this operation as the Israeli Samson Option.

== Disclosure and prosecution ==
On 28 March 2001, Yaakov was arrested at Ben Gurion Airport.

== Autobiography ==
In 2011, Yaakov published a rewritten memoir in Israel, after discarding an earlier attempt to write about his experiences.

== Death ==
Yitzhak Yaakov's grave in Kfar Saba.

Yaakov lived in Tel Aviv until his death. He died on 25 March 2013, a day after his 87th birthday, in Tel Aviv-Yafo.

== See also ==
- 1967 Operation Doomsday
- Arie Amit
- Eliezer Ben-Ami – another pre-state militant who later worked in weapons development.
- USS Liberty incident – another controversial event from the Six-Day War.
