= Gush Etzion Convoy =

The Convoy of Ten was a convoy of four vehicles intended to deliver supplies from Jerusalem to the settlements of Gush Etzion on the 28 Kislev 5708 (December 11, 1947). At the 15th kilometer from Jerusalem, the convoy was attacked by an ambush set by Arab forces. During the attack, ten members of the convoy were killed.

== Background ==
The UN Partition Plan, approved on November 29, 1947, left about 30 settlements outside the borders of the Jewish state, including the four kibbutzim of Gush Etzion: Kfar Etzion, Masu'ot Yitzhak, Ein Tzurim, and Revadim. These four kibbutzim had a combined population of approximately 450 people, including 69 children. The settlements were isolated, and the nearest Jewish point (about 20 kilometers away) was Jerusalem, though the road to it passed through a hostile Arab area, including the city of Bethlehem.

After the Arabs rejected the UN partition plan, they began harassing Jewish vehicles on the roads. On December 8, 1947, an attack was carried out on a vehicle traveling from Gush Etzion to Jerusalem. From that time onwards, the bus service of "Egged" between Gush Etzion and Jerusalem ceased, and transportation was conducted solely in convoys that departed from Jerusalem daily to bring supplies to Gush Etzion. The leadership of the Yishuv decided not to abandon the residents of Gush Etzion. Reinforcements were sent to the area, including a reserve unit of the Palmach, a mobile guard unit of the Notrim, and trainees from the officer course of the Haganah Field Corps in Jerusalem.

The Palestine Police Force had mandated that required that Haganah convoys travel in pickup tracks, under the belief that armored vehicles would provoke a stronger Arab response, though the ultimate devastating ambush of the four trucks indicated that the approach was a failure.

== Departure and attack on the convoy ==
On Thursday, 11 December, the eve of the fifth night of Hanukkah, at around 3:30 PM, a convoy departed from Jerusalem towards Gush Etzion. It consisted of four vehicles with 26 passengers, including eight guards. Among the passengers were the commander of the Etzion Bloc, Dani Mass, his deputy, who was also the commander of the Palmach platoon, Yitzhak Yaakov (Itza), and Yair Mondlack, secretary of Kibbutz Revadim, along with his wife, a nurse named Yaffa. The convoy was on its way to deliver supplies to the residents of the Etzion Bloc, including food, water, gas canisters for cooking, kitchen utensils, and sacks of flour. The journey from Jerusalem to Gush Etzion usually took about 30 minutes, and the convoy was supposed to split at the Gush Etzion Junction. The convoy had no appointed commander (despite Dani Mass being among the passengers), it was not organized as a military operation, and there was no communication between the vehicles.

As the convoy departed, one of the members noticed a soldier from the Arab Legion on Azza Street signaling towards Bethlehem, possibly alerting others of the convoy’s departure. After driving for about 15 to 20 minutes towards Gush Etzion, the convoy reached the area near the British police station in Bethlehem. After passing the police station, they saw a motorcyclist speeding ahead, overtaking the convoy, and disappearing. Five to ten minutes later, at the 15-kilometer mark, the convoy reached a sharp turn that forced the vehicles to slow down as they ascended the hill. During the ascent, fire suddenly opened on the convoy from an automatic machine gun stationed behind a terrace on the side of Jerusalem-Hebron Road, and soon after, fire erupted from all directions. The bullets hit the radiator of the lead vehicle and the face of its driver, causing it to stop, blocking the path of the rest of the convoy. The convoy members jumped from the vehicles, took cover, and returned fire with the six rifles they had. The last vehicle in the convoy, carrying Dani Mass, Yitzhak Yaakov, and the other Palmach members, reversed back to the Bethlehem police station to call for help. According to Uri Milstein, following this event, Mass had to leave his command over Gush Etzion and the bloc itself, as he had abandoned his men during the battle. Due to the narrow, mountainous road, the driver had to reverse for about two kilometers, carrying several wounded, before he could turn around. One of the guards, Yaakov Herling, jumped from the vehicle and joined the group returning fire.

About 15 minutes after the attack began, two British traffic police officers arrived from Hebron and ordered the Arabs to cease fire. When the Arabs did not comply, one British officer drove his vehicle through the front line while the other took cover in a trench about 40 meters from the battle. Only when a British military jeep arrived from Bethlehem did the Arabs stop firing. The head of the Notrim, Eliyahu Bar Hama, used the pause to request that the British soldiers take him back to Bethlehem with them to summon help. This left the convoy’s guards without commanders. The soldiers agreed to his request, and as the jeep began to drive, the Arabs opened fire on it, but none of the passengers were hit. Upon arriving at the Bethlehem police station, the Notrim commander contacted Jerusalem, requested assistance and ambulances, and demanded that the British officer on-site dispatch troops to the scene of the attack. The officer hesitated for nearly half an hour before finally setting out with a platoon of soldiers.

Most of the convoy’s remaining members had already been killed, and their bodies were scattered on the road. The Arab gangs descended from the ridge shouting "Inzil! Jihad wa Allah ala al-Yahud" (Come down! Holy war and death to the Jews), followed by a large crowd of cheering women and children. The Arabs mutilated the bodies of the fallen, stabbing them with knives, stripping them of their clothes, and setting the vehicles on fire. As the cars ignited, the gas canisters exploded, causing the attackers to flee. The convoy was only about six to seven kilometers from Gush Junction, and around 10 kilometers from Kibbutz Kfar Etzion.

After some delay, three British armored vehicles arrived with a British commander. They refused to evacuate the wounded, and it was only about twenty minutes later that the Notrim and ambulances from Jerusalem arrived to collect the injured and dead. The bodies of the fallen were taken to "Bikur Holim Hospital" in Jerusalem (Yaakov Herling’s body was retrieved from the scene the following day), and the six wounded were transferred to Hadassah Medical Center on Mount Scopus.

After the attack, it became clear that intelligence had been received about the Arab attackers’ plans at the Haganah headquarters in Jerusalem, but the information arrived too late, after the convoy was already en route to Gush Etzion.

Heavy mourning descended on the residents of Jerusalem and the members of Gush Etzion. This attack signaled to the bloc’s settlements that they were in the midst of a war and under a partial siege that periodically tightened into a full blockade. The residents conducted patrols, searched Arabs moving through the area, and accelerated the digging of fortifications around the settlements of Gush Etzion. On December 27, the British deputy commander of the Bethlehem police explained to Gush representatives that the situation in the area was dire and offered the assistance of the police in evacuating them to Jerusalem. The offer was immediately rejected.

== Casualties of the Convoy of Ten ==
These are the names of the fallen from the Convoy of Ten:

From Kibbutz Kfar Etzion: Shlomo Kalpholtz, Shalom Karniel, Shmuel Konigsberg, Menachem Wald.
From Kibbutz Masu'ot Yitzhak: Moshe Weinberger.
From Kibbutz Ein Tzurim: Raphael Heymann.
From Jerusalem: Zeev Safrai, Yaakov Herling, David Rifman.
From Ein Ganim: Yitzhak Poches.

Most of the fallen were buried in Mount Herzl on November 17, 1949, along with the rest of the fallen from the Battle of Gush Etzion.

The memory of the fallen of the convoy is commemorated on "Mevo HaAsarah Street" in the French Hill neighborhood of Jerusalem.
