= Yosef Yitzchak Shloush =

Rabbi

Yosef Yitzchak Shloush (Chelouche) (Hebrew: יוסף יצחק שלוּש; 1890–1960), known to his community as "Rebbi Yosef", was an Israeli rabbi. He lived in the old city of Jerusalem until 1938 when he moved to Machane Yehuda. He was the head of the Chevrah Kadisha and the Av bet din (rabbinical court head) of the Sephardic community of Jerusalem.

== Family ==
Shloush and his wife Sa'ada had two sons, David Chaim Shloush the Chief Rabbi of Netanya, Avraham Shloush the Chief Rabbi of Kfar Saba and a daughter, Avigayil.

His father, Rabbi David Shloush was a Rosh Yeshiva (dean of a yeshiva) in Marrakesh, Morocco.

== See also ==
- Tzuf Dvash Synagogue
- Maghrebim
