= David Amar =

Moroccan businessman

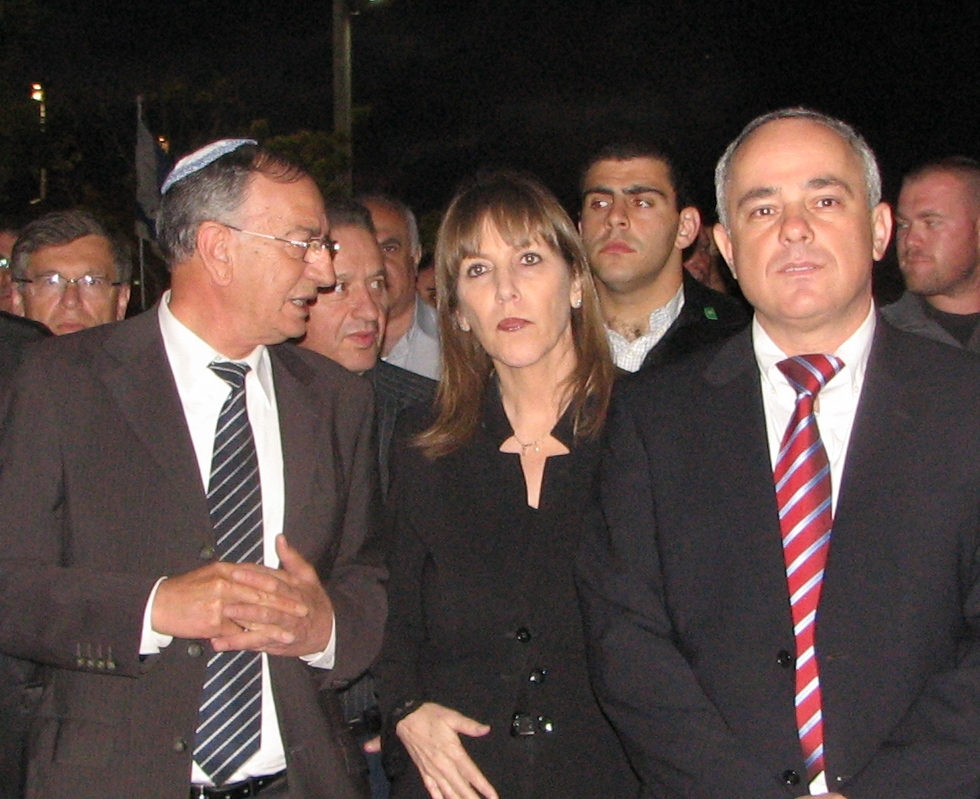
- David Amar (left) with Limor Livnat (center) & Yuval Steinitz (right)
- Born: 1920; Settat, Morocco
- Died: 2000 (aged 79–80)
- Occupation: Businessman
- Known for: David Amar Worldwide North Africa Jewish Heritage Center
- Children: 3
- Relatives: Raphael Edery (son-in-law); Paul J. Fribourg (son-in-law)

David Amar (1920–2000) was a Moroccan businessman, leader of the Moroccan Jewish community, politician, and philanthropist.

== Early life ==
David Amar was born in Settat, Morocco.

== Business career ==
Amar was the head of Omnium Nord-Africain, Morocco's largest conglomerate, until he resigned in January 1986, and was replaced by King Hassan's son-in-law Fouad Felalli. The circumstances of this were unclear and may have been due to retirement, or to a loss of influence, and Amar sold all of his shares in the company.

== Political career ==
Amar was president of the Jewish community in Kenitra, which was where he started his business career. He established connections with Moroccan nationalists, which helped him obtain the position of secretary general of the Conseil des Communautés Israélites du Maroc (CCIM) after Moroccan independence in 1956.

Amar was involved in Operation Yachin, in which 97,000 Moroccan Jews emigrated to Israel in 1961 to 1964.

For 26 years, from 1965 to 1986 (at least), Amar was president of the Council of Moroccan Jewish Communities. He was also president of the World Assembly of Moroccan Jewry.

In 1965, Amar was a member of the Chamber of Moroccan Counselors.

At the time of the 1971 coup attempt, Amar briefly fled abroad due to his closeness to King Hassan II. In 1984, Amar was made an Officer in the Order of the Throne by King Hassan.

== Philanthropy ==
He funded the restoration of the North Africa Jewish Heritage Center in Jerusalem, which was named the David Amar Worldwide North Africa Jewish Heritage Center in his honour.

== Personal life ==
In 1965, his daughter Annie-Claude Amar (died 6 August 1993) married Raphael Cohen (later known as Raphael Edery, a member of the Knesset from 1981 to 1999 and a government minister), an oil company engineer, in the presence of two members of the Moroccan Cabinet, several former Ministers and the National Police Chief.

His son Daniel Amar is a French-Jewish businessman, who owns stakes in Israel Salt Industries and Bank Hapoalim.

Amar lived in a villa in "Casablanca's wealthiest district".
