= North Africa Jewish Heritage Center =

Cultural centre and museum in Israel

Coordinates: 31.7763°N 35.2215°E

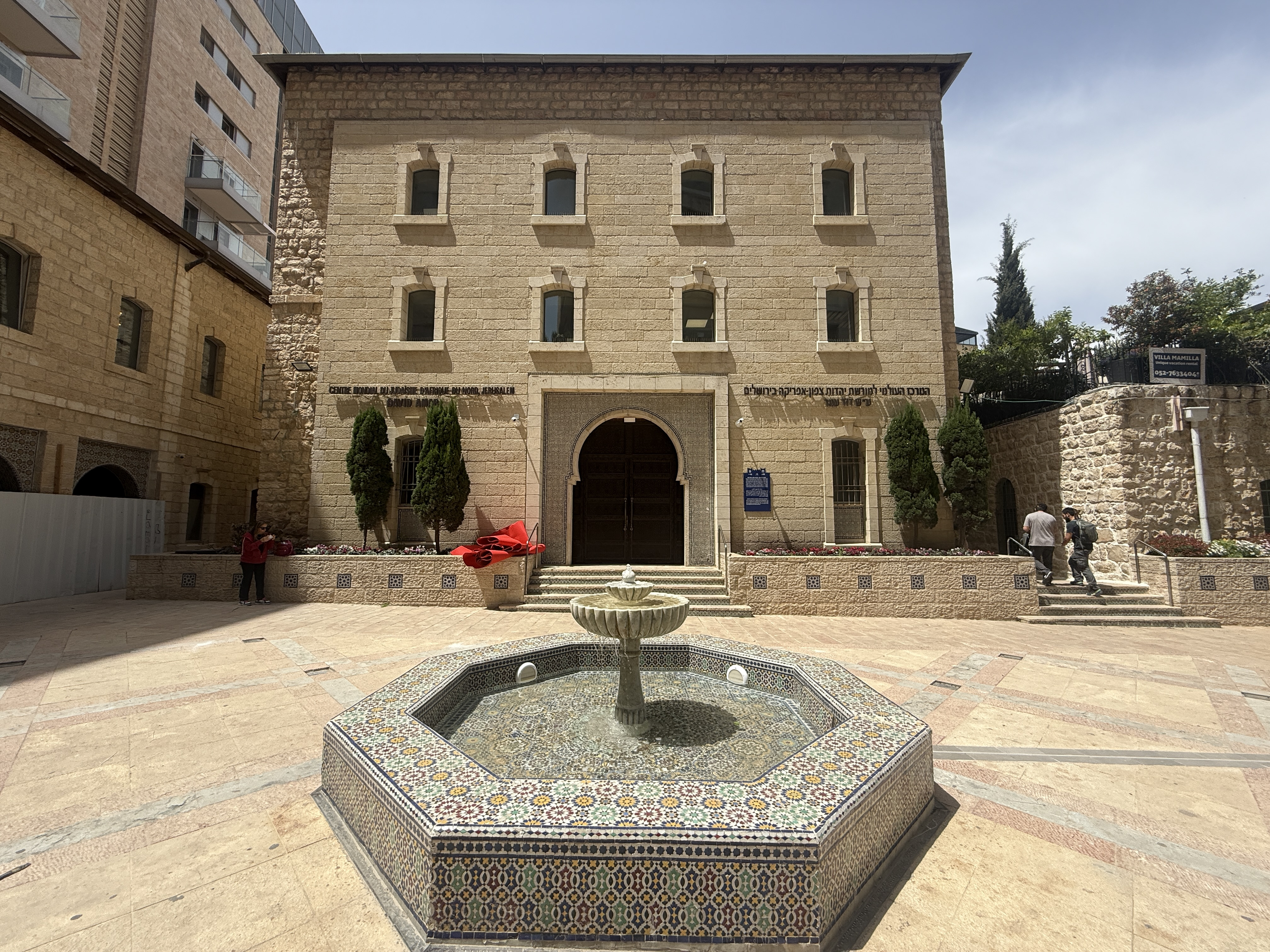
North Africa Jewish Heritage Center

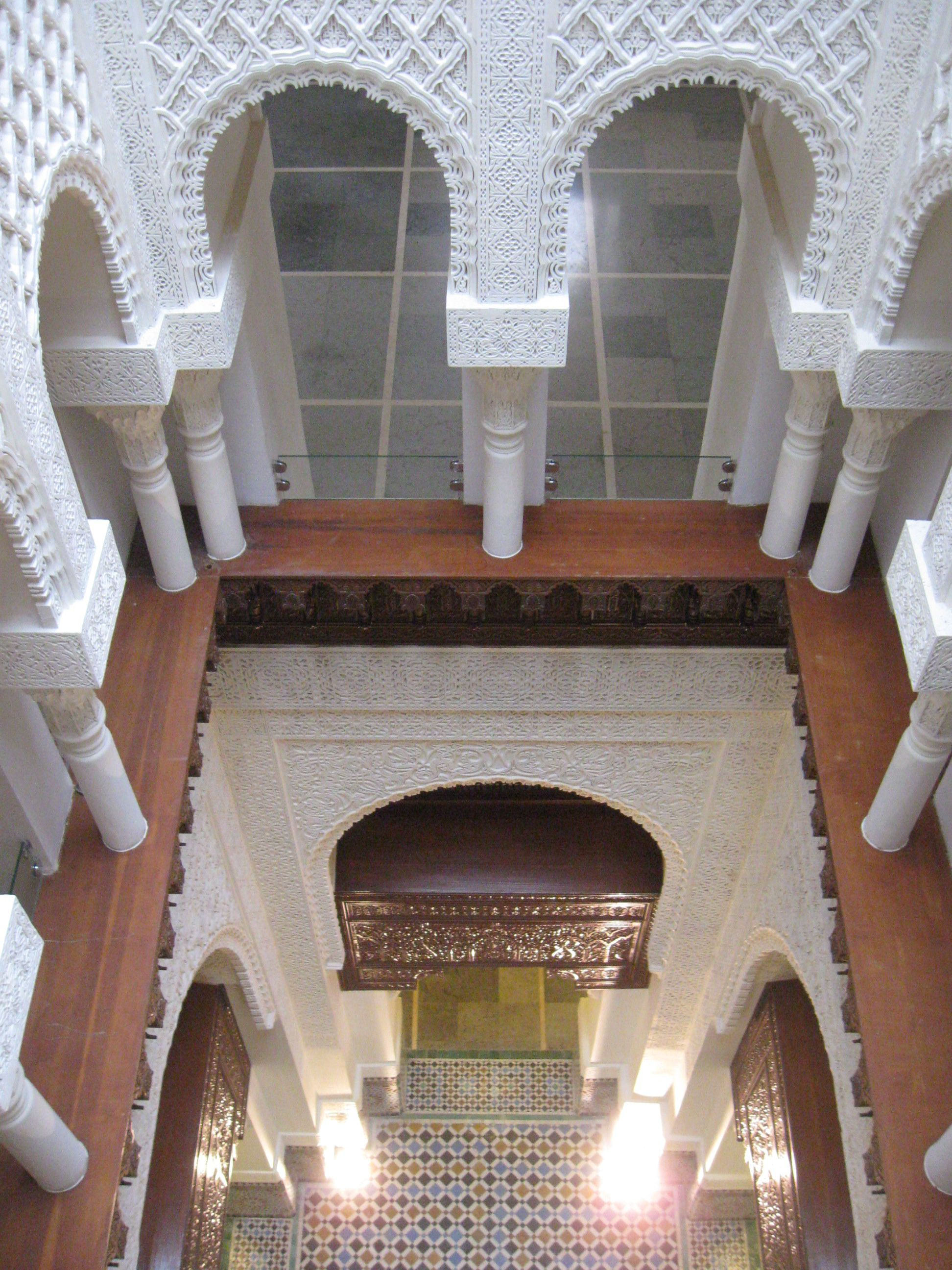
Interior

David Amar Worldwide North Africa Jewish Heritage Center is a cultural centre and museum in Jerusalem that opened in 2011.

== History ==
The North Africa Jewish Heritage Center is located in the heart of Jerusalem's Mahane Israel neighborhood, which was established in 1865.The house was built in the mid-19th century by David ben Shimon, who founded the community of North African Jews in Jerusalem.Then a two-story building, it served as the home of the rabbi and a number of other families, in addition to housing a synagogue and a school.

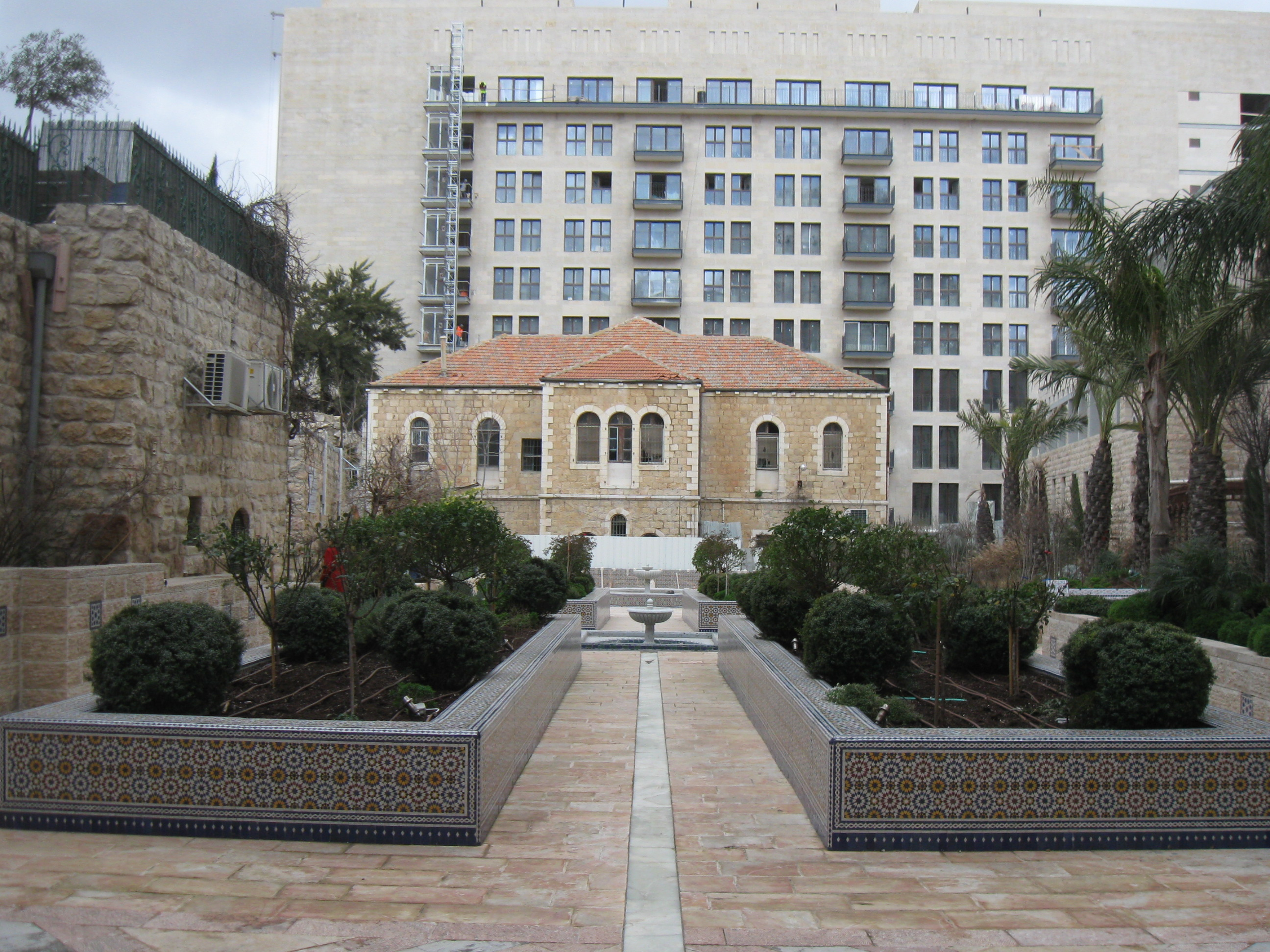
Museum courtyard

The museum has permanent and temporary exhibitions focused on the history and heritage of the Jewish communities of North Africa, particularly Morocco, Algeria and Tunisia.

The restoration was funded by the Casablanca, Morocco-based businessman David Amar, and was renamed in his honour. Work took four years and required a team of Moroccan craftsmen to create the intricate zellige mosaic tile work.

Reconstructing the building in an authentic Moroccan style was controversial, as some saw it as "importing foreign architecture and damaging a historic building", but it was envisaged as an important tourist site.

The center opened in June 2011 in the presence of President Shimon Peres and former President Yitzhak Navon.

== See also ==
- Babylonian Jewry Heritage Center
