= Abraham ibn Zimra =

Spanish rabbi

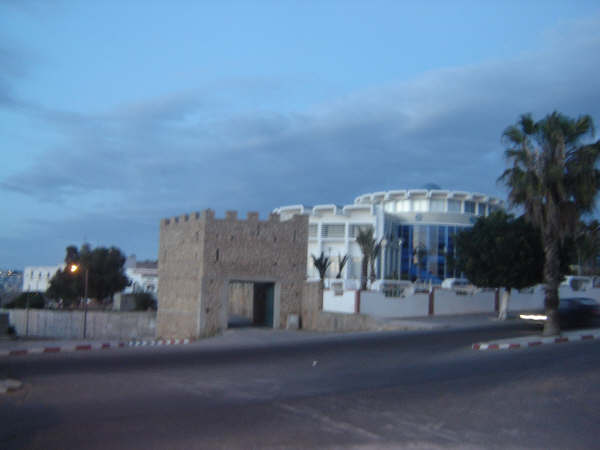
The shrine of Abraham ben Zmirro and his six sons in Safi, Morocco

Abraham ibn Zimra (French: Abraham Benzamiro) was a Spanish rabbi, physician and diplomat who fled to Morocco following the Spanish Inquisition.

Descended from a well-known and respected Sephardi family, ibn Zimra settled in Safi, Morocco following the expulsion from Spain in 1492. He was a talented calligrapher and composed poetry in Hebrew and Arabic.

He is buried in Safi with his six siblings and his tomb is the site of an annual pilgrimage.
