= Royal Moroccan Tennis Federation =

The Royal Moroccan Tennis Federation (Arabic: الجامعة الملكية للتنس, often shortened as FRMT for its French acronym Fédération Royale Marocaine de Tennis) is the national governing body of tennis in Morocco. It was founded in 1957. It is currently presided by Fayçal Laraichi, a close collaborator of Mohammed VI and the chairman of the state-owned television and radio SNRT.

== Presidents ==
- Ahmed Djibli (1957–1964)
- Mohamed Mjid (1964–2009)
- Fayçal Laraichi (2009–)
