= Mahane Israel =

Jewish neighborhood built outside the walls of the Old City of Jerusalem

Coordinates: 31°46′35.93″N 35°13′17.57″E

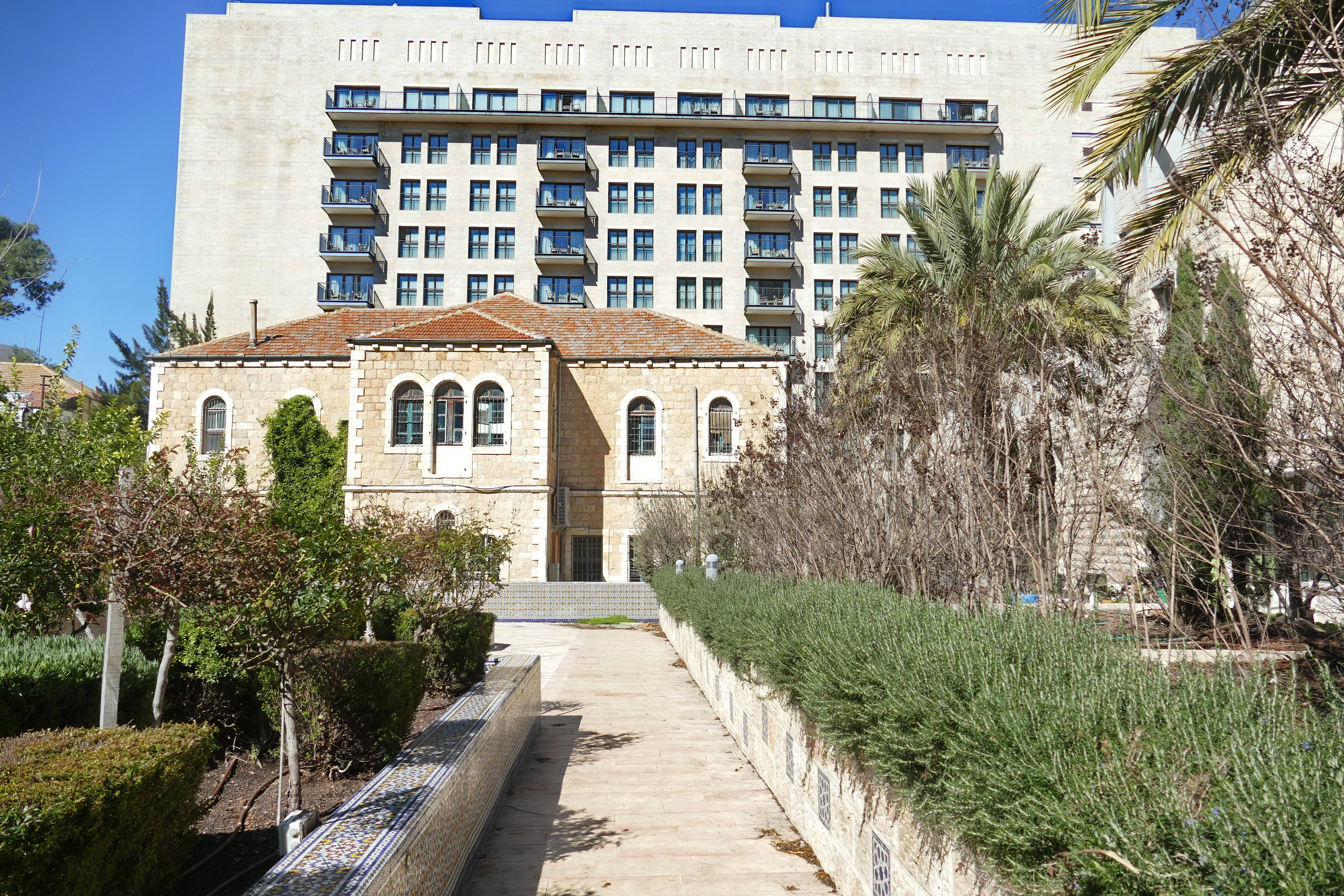
Mahane Israel

Mahane Israel (Hebrew: מחנה ישראל, Mahaneh Yisra'el) is the second Jewish neighborhood built outside the walls of the Old City of Jerusalem after Mishkenot Shaananim.

== History ==
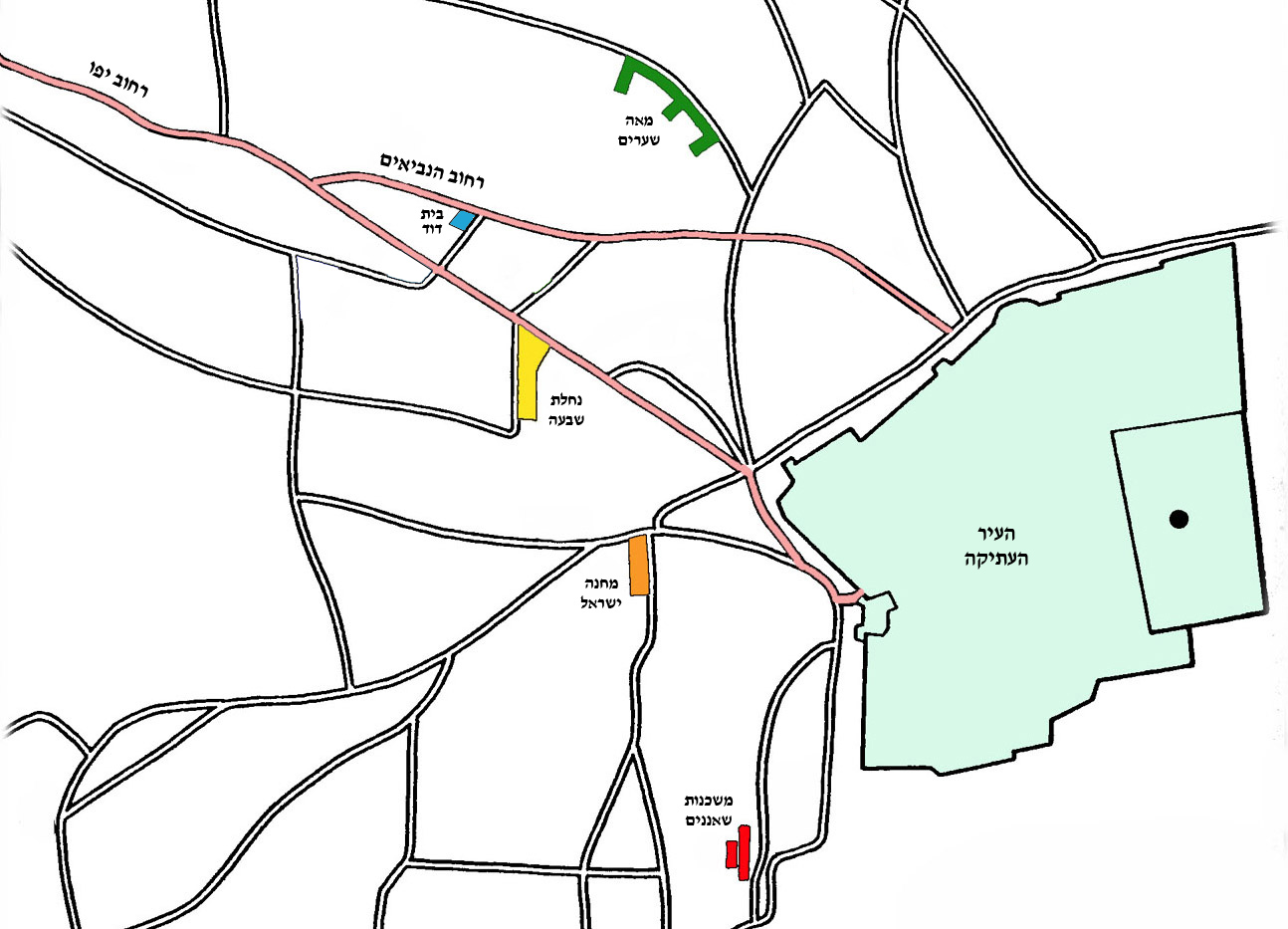
Map

Mahane Israel was the first neighborhood built by residents of the Old City on their own behalf, as part of the expansion of Jerusalem in the 19th century (Hebrew: היציאה מן החומות). Mahane Israel was built by and for Jews from Maghreb. It was established by the Moroccan-born Jewish leader, David ben Shimon in 1867. Although the neighborhood was described as very small, it wasn't significantly smaller than other neighborhoods built at the same period. Men studied in different shifts throughout the night in the central shul, Tzuf Devash, for spiritual reasons and also to fend off possible nighttime attacks. Maghrebi Jews at the end of the 19th century numbered more than 2,000 persons, comprising 25% of the entire Sephardic community in Jerusalem.

Ceremonial military parade at Mahane Israel. Left to right: Yitzhak Yaakov, Zvika Zamir, Yaakov Hefetz.

== See also ==
- Expansion of Jerusalem in the 19th century
- North Africa Jewish Heritage Center
