= Sea Castle (Safi) =

16th century fortification in Safi

Coordinates: 32°17′50.7″N 9°14′39.5″W

Sea Castle of Safi
- Ksar el Bahr, Dar Bahar, Castelo do Mar
- Safi, Morocco
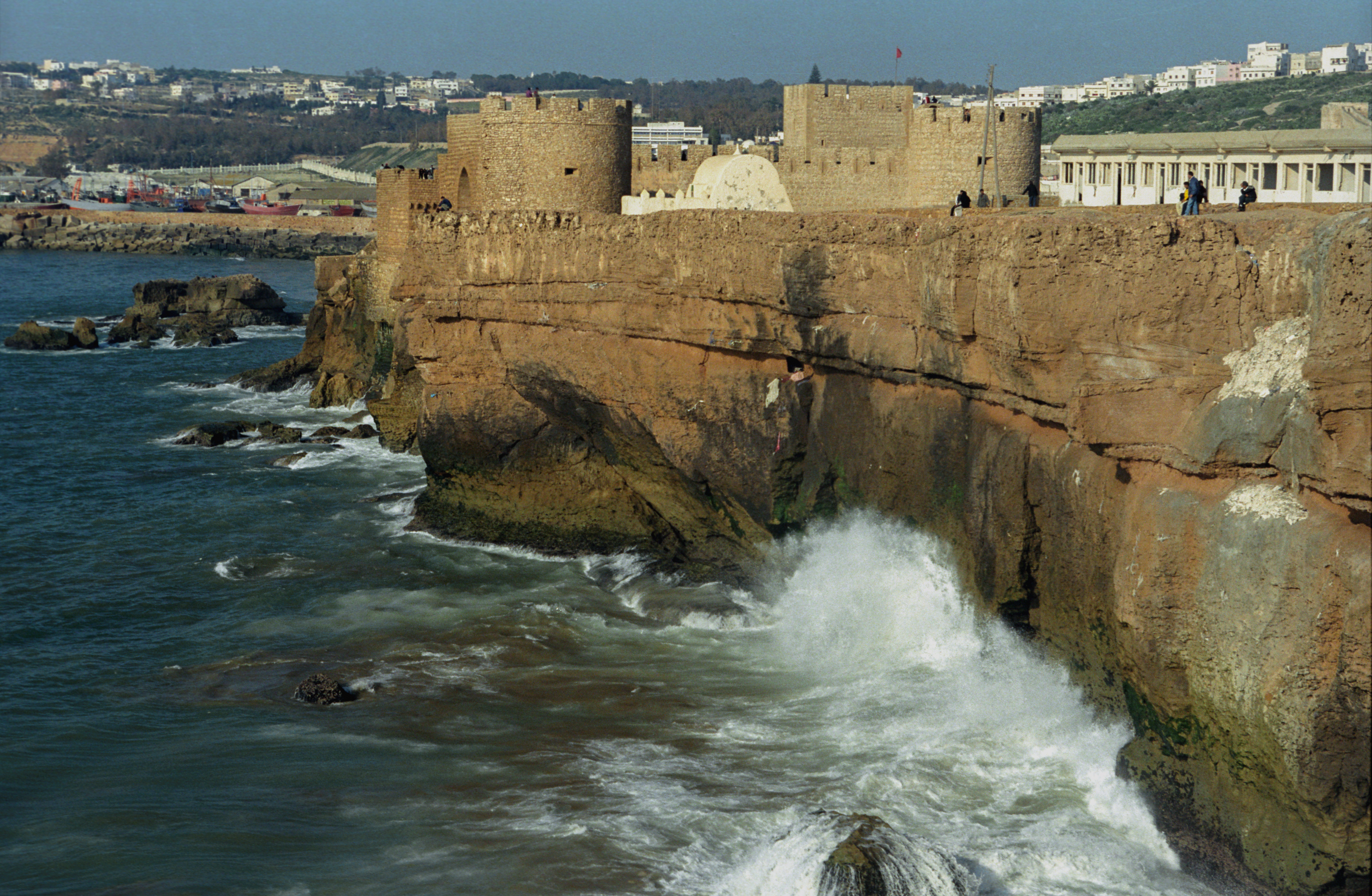

Site information
- Type: Castle
- Condition: At risk

Site history
- Built: 1515-1517
- Built by: Portuguese Empire

The Sea Castle of Safi is a 16th-century fortification in Safi, Morocco. It was built by the Portuguese Empire beginning in 1515, and it is a heritage monument in the modern period. In the 21st century, the fortress experienced neglect and risk of collapse. By 2023, it was closed and in need of repairs.

== History ==
In the late 15th century, John II of Portugal acquired several fortifications in northern Morocco, and Manuel I expanded this presence down the Atlantic coast. Safi, an important port in the pepper trade, came under Portuguese control in 1488, and it experienced a broader military occupation in 1508 initiated by captain Diogo de Azambuja. The sea fortress at Safi was then constructed in 1515–1517 as part of the network of Portuguese fortifications stretching southward from Tangier and Ceuta.

== Description ==
The sea fortress in Safi resembles that of an earlier fortress in Tangier. The structure is rectangular and rests directly on a cliff over the Atlantic. It features a mix of rounded and squared towers, with one of the towers being attached to the main structure by an arch. It previously contained residential facilities for the Portuguese governor and prisoners. In 1929, a travel writer provided the following description:

A fine old Portuguese castle, the Dar Bahar or House of the Sea, consisting of a series of towers and battlemented walls of great strength and beauty, rises sheer from the Atlantic and completes the system of fortifications. Its base is a rock, against which the waves are constantly breaking in clouds of spray.

— L. E. Bickerstaffe, M.A., Things Seen in Morocco (1929)

== Architecture ==
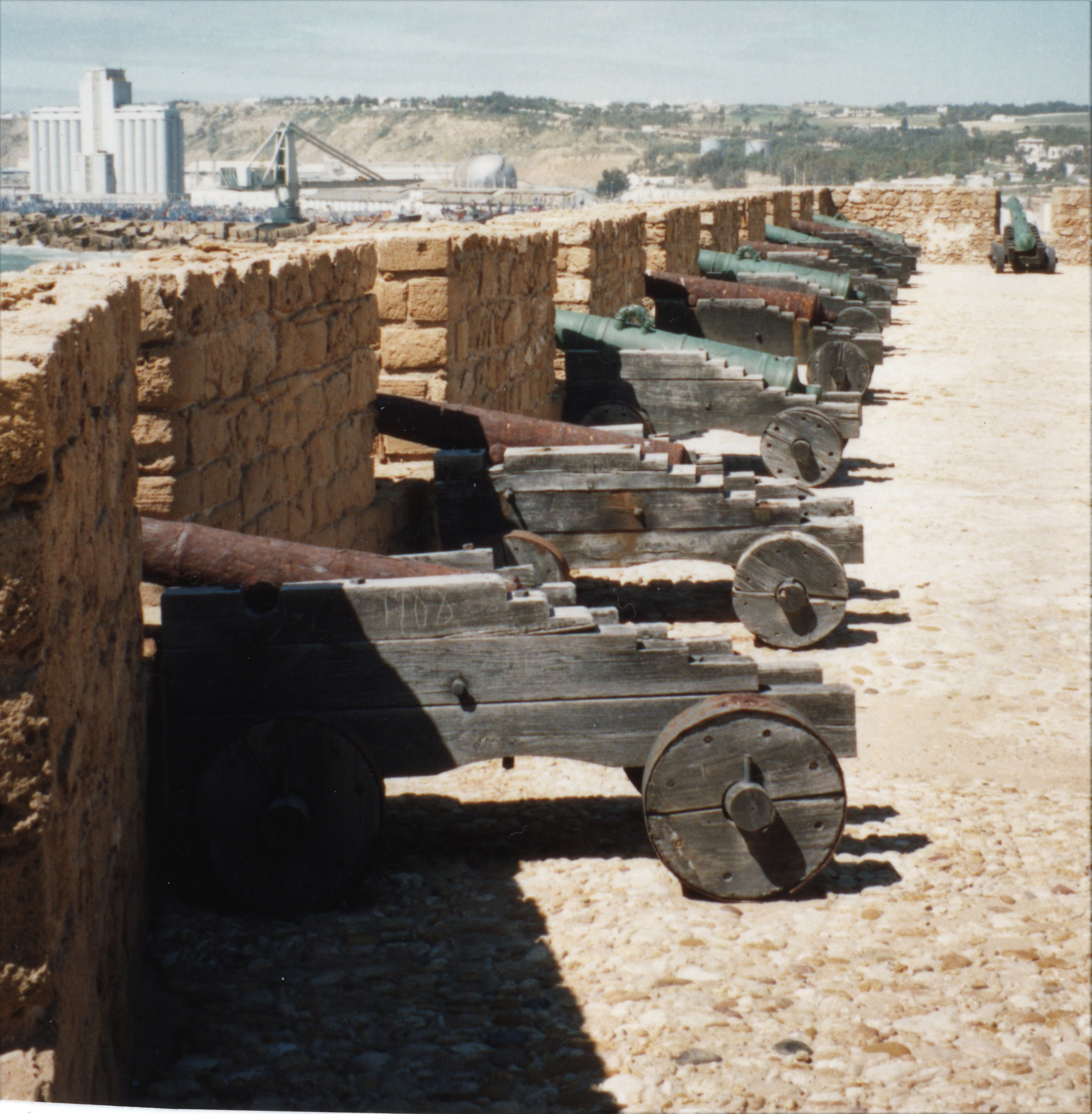
Fortress Cannons

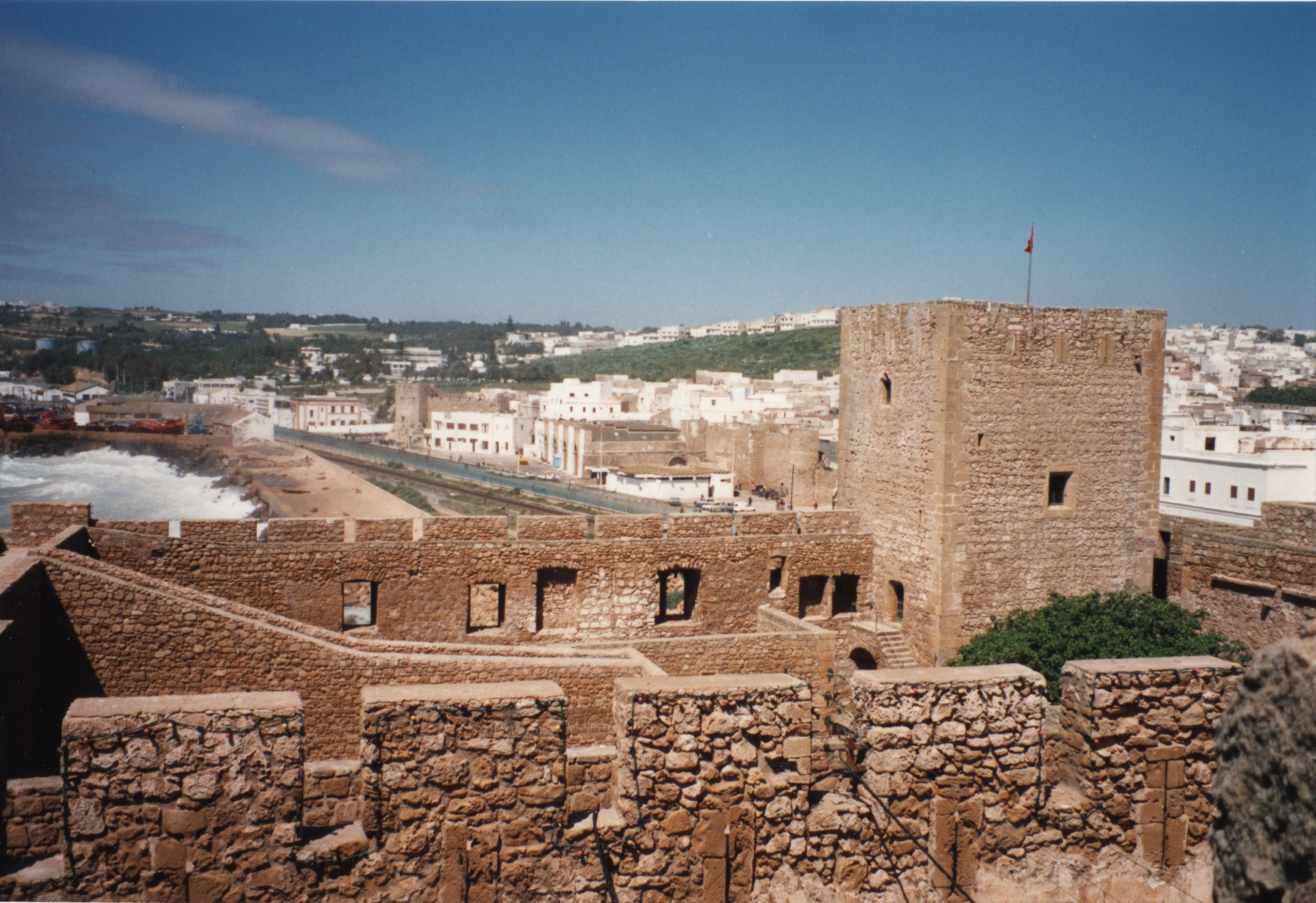
Safi behind a squared tower

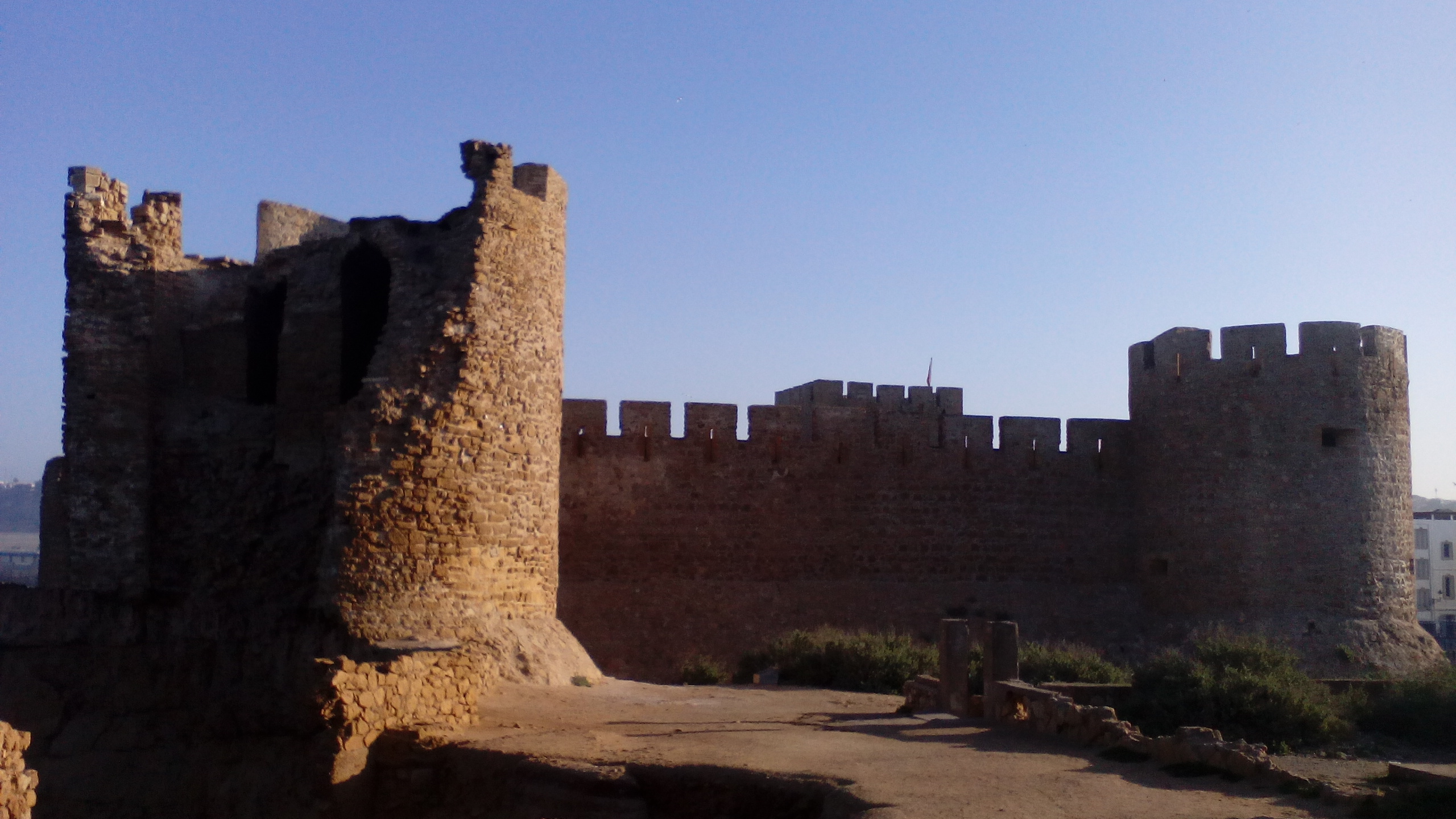
Rounded towers

== See also ==
- Portuguese colonial architecture
