= 1973 Israeli municipal elections =

Local elections in several municipalities and councils in Israel

← 1969	31 December 1973	1978 →

Municipal elections took place in Israel on 31 December 1973, having been delayed from their original date on 30 October because of the Yom Kippur War. They were the last municipal elections to take place on the date of a legislative election, and the first in which the newly formed Likud participated.

== Elections By Municipality ==
=== In Cities ===
In Jerusalem, Alignment candidate and Incumbent Mayor Teddy Kollek was re-elected, with his party winning 14 of the City Council's 31 seats. The Likud won 7 seats, Agudat Yisrael and Mafdal won 4 seats each, and the rest were split between local lists, who won one seat each, a Black Panther list failed to cross the City Council's electoral threshold.

In Tel Aviv, the Likud, led by Shlomo Lahat, won 14 seats and was elected Mayor, while the Alignment, led by Incumbent Mayor Yehoshua Rabinovitz, won 11. The Independent Liberal Party and Mafdal won two seats each, while Agudat Yisrael and the Boyer List won one seat each. Moked, Maki and the Black Panther list failed to cross the City Council's electoral threshold.

In Haifa, the Alignment, led by Yosef Almogi, won 15 seats in the City Council. The Likud won 6 seats, Mafdal won 2 seats, and Agudat Yisrael and the Independent Liberal Party won one seat each.

In Beersheba, the Alignment, led by Eliyahu Nawi, won 9 out of 17 seats on the City Council.

The Alignment also elected mayors in:

- Dimona (Armon Lardo)
- Holon (Pinhas Eylon)
- Eilat (Gadi Katz)
- Safed (Aharon Nahmias)
- Givatayim (Ya'akov Kreisman)
- Ashkelon (Aaron Heibi)
- Herzliya (Yosef Navo)
- Tiberias (Moshe Tzachar)
- Kfar Saba (Ze'ev Geller)
- Nahariya (Ephraim Shrir)

The Likud also elected mayors in:

- Ashdod (Zvi Zilker)
- Rehovot (Shmuel Rechtman)
- Hadera (Dov Barzilay)
- Bat Yam (Yitzhak Valker)
- Ramat Gan (Yisrael Peled)

In Rishon LeZion, the local 'List for Rishon LeZion' led by Mayor Hananya Gibstein defeated the Alignment.

In Netanya, the Alignment and the Likud won the same number of seats, with the former ultimately forming a coalition.

Kiryat Ata elected Mafdal, led by Aharon Abuhatzira.

=== Regional Councils ===
The Alignment formed local governments in Beit She'an, Beit Shemesh, Nesher, Metula, Or Yehuda, Neve Monosson, Mazkeret Batya, Zikhron Ya'akov and Givat Ada. Local lists defeated the Alignment in Azor, Rosh Pina, Ramat HaSharon and Kiryat Ono.

Mafdal re-elected incumbent head of the Gedera local council Shalom Cohen, and formed a local government in Yeruham.

The Likud formed local governments in Yavne (led by Meir Sheetrit), Kiryat Malakhi (led by Moshe Katsav), Yavne'el, Netivot, Menahemia and Kfar Yona.

In Jisr az-Zarqa, the Progress and Development formed a local government. In Kiryat Shmona, Ratz, led by Avraham Aloni, formed a local government, and In Yesud HaMa'ala, Shavei Tzion and Kfar Tavor one list ran unopposed.
