= Aharon Nahmias =

Israeli politician (1932–1998)

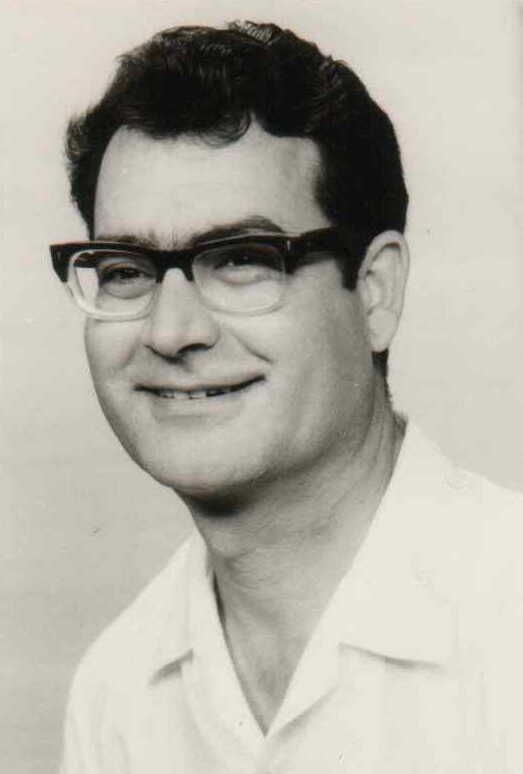
- Nahmias in the 1980s

Faction represented in the Knesset
- 1981–1988: Alignment

Personal details
- Born: 10 June 1932 Safi, Morocco
- Died: 8 November 1998 (aged 66)

Aharon-Rafael Nahmias (Hebrew: אהרן-רפאל נחמיאס; 10 June 1932 – 8 November 1998) was an Israeli politician who served as mayor of Safed from 1973 until 1983, and as a member of the Knesset for the Alignment from 1981 until 1988.

== Biography ==
Born in Safi in Morocco in 1932, Nahmias emigrated to Israel in 1951. He became a member of the Moshavim Movement Co-ordinating Committee and of the Hevrat Ovdim secretariat.

Between 1962 and 1973 he served as secretary of Safed Workers Council, and between 1973 and 1983 served as the city's mayor. He was also a member of the Local Government central committee and was on the board of directors of the Shikun VePituah and Shikun Ovdim housing companies.

In 1981 he was elected to the Knesset on the Alignment list. He was re-elected in 1984, and was appointed Deputy Speaker. He lost his seat in the 1988 elections.

He died in 1998 at the age of 66.
