= Abdul Karim =

ʻAbd al-Karīm (ALA-LC romanization of Arabic: عبد الكريم) is a Muslim male given name and, in modern usage, also a surname. It is built from the Arabic words ʻabd and al-Karīm, one of the names of God in the Qur'an, which give rise to the Muslim theophoric names. It means "servant of the most Generous". It is rendered as Abdolkarim in Persian, Abdulkerim in Albania, Bosnia and Abdülkerim in Turkey.

It may refer to:

== Given name ==
- Abd al-Karīm ibn Hawāzin Qushayri (986–1074), Persian philosopher
- ʻAbd al-Karim al-Jili (1366–1424), Sufi author who studied in Yemen
- Abdal-Karim Khan Astrakhani (died 1520), Khan of Astrakhan, 1490–1504
- `Abd al-Karim ibn Muhammad (died 1834), Emir of Harar, Ethiopia
- Abdülkerim Nadir Pasha (1807–1883), Ottoman Turkish soldier
- Abdul-Karim Ha'eri Yazdi (1859–1937), Iranian Twelver Shia Muslim cleric
- Abdul Karim (the Munshi) (1863–1909), Indian servant to Queen Victoria
- Abdul Karim Sahitya Bisharad (1871–1953), Bangladesh author
- Abdul Karim Khan (1872–1937), Indian singer
- Abdul Karim Amrullah (1879–1945), Muslim reformer in Sumatra
- Abd el-Krim (1882–1963), leader of the Amazigh-Riffian resistance and president of the Republic of the Rif
- Abd-al Karim (1897–1927), Afghan rebel leader during the Khost rebellion (1924–1925)
- Mehmed Abdülkerim Osmanoğlu (1906–1935), Ottoman prince invited to Japan to set up a puppet state in Xinjiang during the Kumul Rebellion
- Abdul Karim Disu (1912–2000), Nigerian journalist
- Abd al-Karim Qasim (1914–1963), Iraqi Army officer who seized power in a 1958 coup d'état
- Abdelkarim Ghellab (1919–2017), Moroccan writer
- Abdelkrim Ghallab (1919–2006), Moroccan writer
- Abdul Karim Haghshenas (1919–2007), Iranian Shia Cleric
- Abdul Karim (soil scientist) (1922–1973), Bangladeshi scientist
- Abdul Karim (Bengali politician) (1925–2000), Bangladeshi politician
- Abd al-Karim al-Nahlawi (1926–2016), Syrian military officer and politician
- Abdul-Karim Mousavi Ardebili (1926–2016), Iranian Twelver cleric
- Abdul Karim (historian) (1928–2007), Bangladeshi historian and academic
- Abdul Karim Khandker (1930–2025), Bangladeshi air officer and politician
- Abdelkarim Tabbal (born 1931), Moroccan poet
- Abdolkarim Hasheminejad (1932–1981), Iranian Shia Cleric
- Abdel Karim el Kably (1932–2021), Sudanese singer
- Abdul Karim Abdullah al-Arashi (1934–2006), Yemeni politician
- Abd al-Karim al-Iryani (1934–2015), Yemeni politician
- Abdelkrim Motii (born 1935), Moroccan religious activist
- Abdul Karim Tunda (born 1943), alleged Indian bomb maker
- Abdul Karim Koroma (born 1944), Sierra Leonean politician
- Abdolkarim Soroush (born 1945), Iranian scientist and philosopher
- Abdelkarim Badjadja (born 1945), Algerian historian
- Abdul Karim Saeed Pasha (born 1945), leader of Lahore Ahmadiyya Movement
- Abdulkareem Adisa (1948–2005), Nigerian soldier and politician
- Abdul Karim al-Kabariti (born 1949), Jordanian politician
- Abdul Karim, name used by Bruno Metsu (born 1954), French football manager
- Abdul Karim Joumaa (born 1954), Syrian Olympic athlete
- Abdul Karim Brahui (born 1955), Afghan politician
- Abdelkrim Merry (born 1955), Moroccan footballer
- Abdel Karim Obeid (born 1957), Lebanese Shi'a imam
- Abdul Karim Luaibi (born 1959), Iraqi politician
- Abdul Karim Telgi (born 1961), Indian fraudster
- Abdul Karim Farhani (born 1964), Iranian Shia Cleric
- Abdul Karim Irgashive (born 1965), Tajik held in Guantanamo
- Abdul Karim el-Mejjati (1967–2005), French-Moroccan Islamic activist killed in Saudi Arabia
- Abdul Karim (canoeist) (born 1967), Indonesian canoeist
- Abd al-Karim, the name CIA torture victim Mohamed Ahmed Ben Soud (born 1968/69) was referred to by in the Senate report on CIA torture
- Abdelkrim El Hadrioui (born 1972), Moroccan footballer
- Abdul-Karim al-Jabbar (born 1974), American footballer
- Abdulkareem Baba Aminu (born 1977), Nigerian writer and artist
- Abdul Karim Ahmed (born 1980), Ghanaian footballer
- Abdelkarim Kissi (born 1980), Moroccan footballer
- Abdelkarim Nafti (born 1981), Tunisian footballer
- Abdelkrim Mammeri (born 1981), Algerian footballer
- Abdoul Karim Sylla (born 1981), Guinean footballer
- Abdul Karim (Guantanamo detainee 520) (born 1982), Afghan
- Abdul Kareem Nabeel Suleiman Amer, or just Kareem Amer (born 1984), Egyptian blogger
- Abdulkareem Khadr (born 1989), Egyptian-Canadian injured in Pakistan
- Abdulkarim Al-Ali (born 1991), Qatari footballer
- Abdoul Karim Sylla (born 1992), Guinean footballer
- Abdülkerim Bardakcı (born 1994), Turkish footballer
- Abdul Karim (Ghanaian footballer) (born 2000), Ghanaian footballer
- Abdulkarim Al-Arhabi (died 2021), Yemeni politician
- Abdul Karim al-Anizi, Iraqi politician
- Abdel-Karim Mahoud al-Mohammedawi, Iraqi politician
- Abdelkarim Hussein Mohamed Al-Nasser, Saudi alleged terrorist
- Abdul Karim (Khyber Pakhtunkhwa politician), Pakistani politician
- Abdul Karim (Bengal Legislative Assembly member)
- Md. Abdul Karim, Bangladeshi civil servant
- Md. Abdul Karim (Gaibandha politician) (born 1960), Bangladeshi politician

== Surname ==
- Abdul Malik Abdul Kareem (born 1972), one of the perpetrators of Curtis Culwell Center attack
- Ali Abdul Karim (born 1953), Syrian diplomat
- Awatef Abdel Karim (1931–2021), Egyptian composer
- Eedris Abdulkareem (born 1974), Nigerian rapper
- Mohamed Taki Abdoulkarim (1936–1998), President of the Comoros
- Rohani Abdul Karim (born 1955), Malaysian politician
- Shah Abdul Karim (1916–2009), Bangladeshi folk musician
- Yahaya Abdulkarim (born 1944), Nigerian politician
