= Rhoum El Bakkali =

Musical artist

Rhoum El Bakkali رحوم البقالي
- Born: Chefchaouen, Morocco
- Genres: Sufi music
- Occupation: Singer
- Years active: 2004 –

Rhoum El Bakkali (in Arabic: رحوم البقالي, born in Chefchaouen) is a Moroccan Sufi Musical artist, composer and researcher. She is known to be the leader of Hadra Chefchaounia, one of the few all-female Sufi musical groups in the world.

== Early life ==
Rhoum El Bakkali was born in Chefchaouen, a city in northern Morocco, where she grew up in a traditional family interested in Sufism and Sufi music. At the age of 12, she joined the musical conservatory of her city to learn the basics of Andalusian music. She pursued then her leaning in Tetuan and Rabat, until getting a degree in Solfège. She returned then to Chefchaouen and started teaching Solfège and piano at the conservatory.

In 2004, she founded a Sufi musical ensemble called Hadra Chefchaounia, inspired from the old musical traditions of women of the city. Under her leadership, the ensemble performs repertoire consisting of Hadra and folk songs.

== Hadra Chefchaounia ==
Hadra Chefchaounia is an ancient musical Sufi tradition from Chefchaouen, exclusively performed by women. It is a ritual of hymns, incantations and sung prayers which aim at attaining an ecstatic state in a divine presence. The musicians accompany their singing with hand drums or tambourines.

It is said that in the sixteenth century, the Sainte Lalla Hiba Bekkaliya, attached to the Zaouia of the village Douar Haraïk had founded a Hadra composed exclusively of young women; a tradition that continued until the present days. Before 2004, Hadra was only heard in private events and weddings, but with the founding of Rhoum Bakkali's group, this tradition gained fame both locally and internationally, as the ensemble traveled to different countries and participated in several events and festivals.
