= Grand Mosque of Chefchaouen =

Mosque in Chefchaouen, Morocco

- المسجد الأعظم
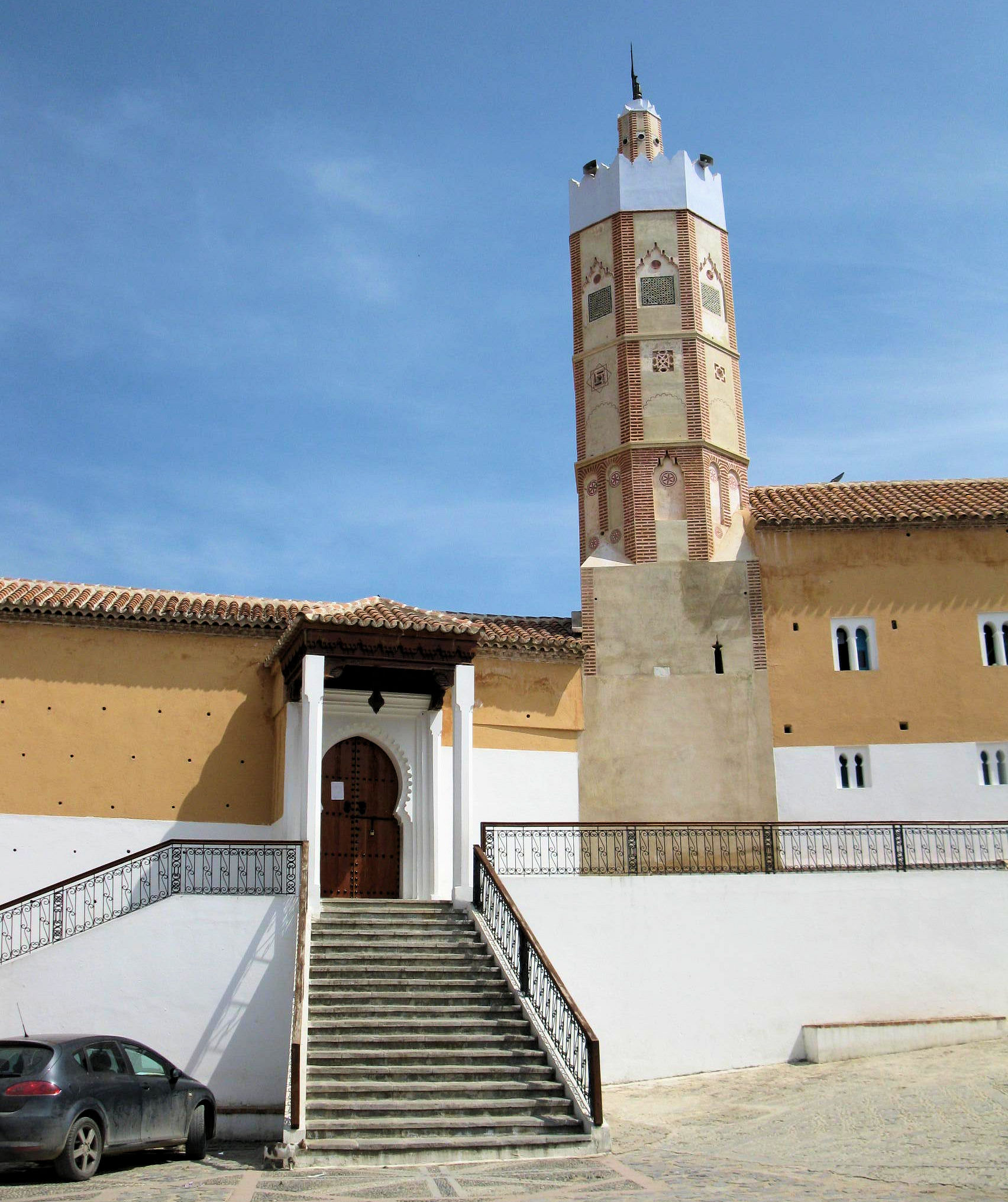
- The entrance and the minaret of the Grand Mosque, from Place Outa Hammam.

Religion
- Sect: Sunni Islam

Location
- Location: Chefchaouen, Morocco
- Interactive map of Grand Mosque of Chefchaouen
- Coordinates: 35°10′6.35″N 5°15′44.4″W

Architecture
- Type: mosque
- Style: Moroccan, Islamic
- Founder: Moulay 'Ali ibn Rashid al-Alami or his son Moulay Mohamed ibn 'Ali ibn Rashid al-Alami
- Established: late 15th or 16th century (1471 or after)
- Minaret: 1

The Grand Mosque of Chefchaouen (Arabic: المسجد الأعظم, romanized: masjid al-ʾaʿaẓam; or الجامع الكبير al-jama ʿal-kabir or الجامع الأكبر al-jamaʿ al-ʾakbar) is the oldest mosque and the main historic Friday mosque of Chefchaouen, Morocco. It is located at the central Place Outa Hammam, near the city's historic kasbah.

== History ==
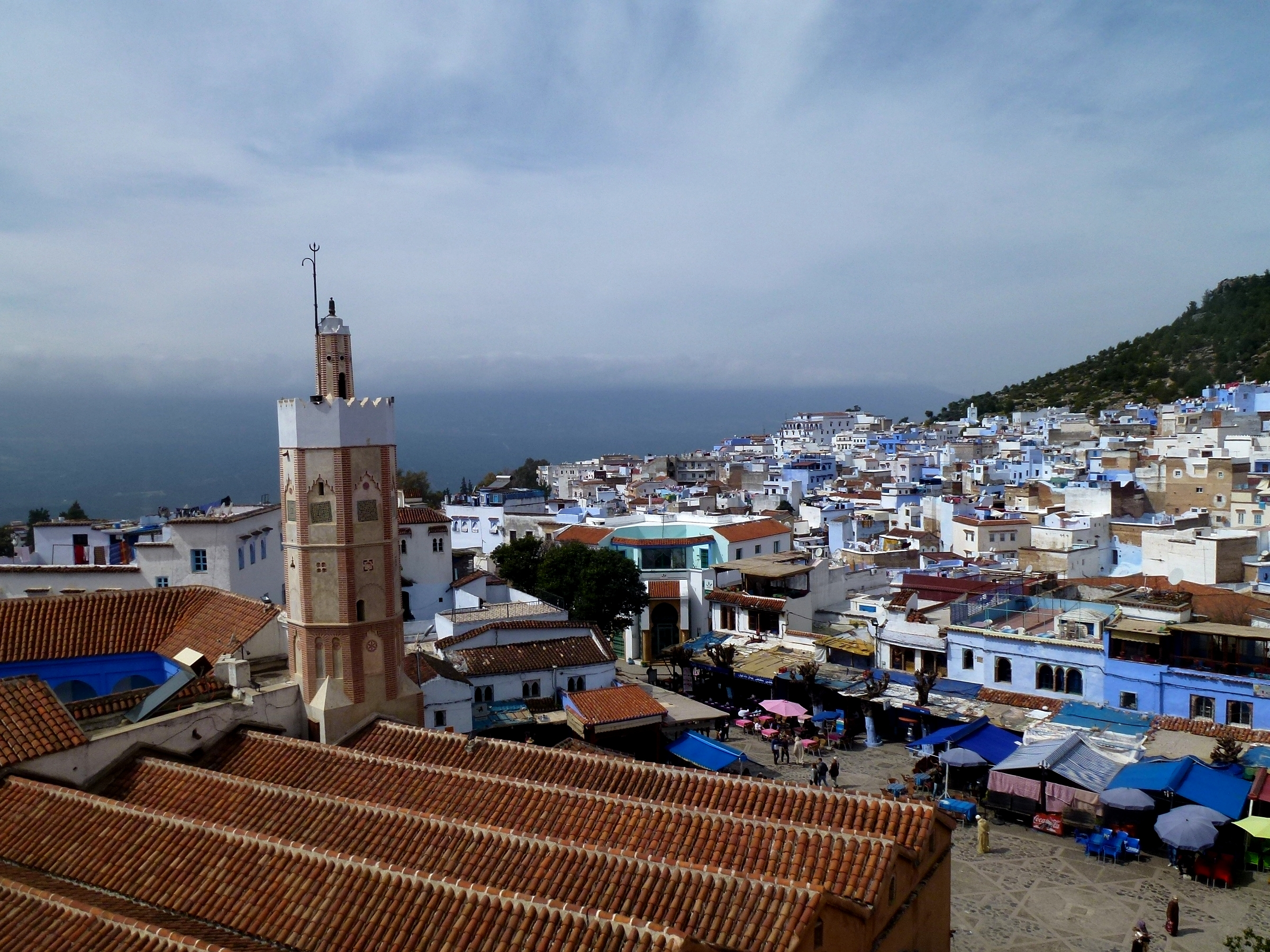
The minaret and roof of the mosque, overlooking Place Outa Hammam.

The mosque dates from the earliest period of the city after its foundation by Moulay 'Ali ibn Rashid al-Alami, but sources vary (or contradict each other) in citing the exact date of its foundation: some date it to 1471 (the date of the city's foundation), another cites 1475-76 (880 AH), and others date it to the 16th century, particularly under Moulay 'Ali's son Mohammed. Its minaret is believed to date from the late 17th century due to its octagonal shaft and overall similarity to the style of minarets built under Ali ibn Abdallah Errifi (the governor of Tangier under Sultan Moulay Isma'il) such as those of the Kasbah Mosque of Tangier or the Great Mosque of Asilah.

The mosque also has a madrasa which historically offered lessons in religious sciences such as fiqh (Islamic jurisprudence) and was accompanied by a dormitory for students. As the city's main Friday mosque, it was also the location where the local rulers or governors of Chefchaouen would pledge their allegiance to the Sultan of Morocco and where the decrees of the latter were read publicly. The mosque was restored in the 19th century and again in the 20th century (when the current portal of its main entrance was built). It was most recently restored in 2006.

== Architecture ==
The mosque occupies an area of around 130 square metres (1,400 sq ft). It consists of a courtyard (sahn), an interior prayer hall, a minaret, a fountain, an ablutions chamber, and a madrasa. the prayer hall is the largest component, consisting of a hypostyle hall with eight "naves" or aisles divided by rows of horseshoe arches running parallel to the southwest qibla wall. Each nave is the width of six arches. The interior is generally undecorated, which is common for other mosques in the city. The hall is roofed with red tiles, in contrast to many of Morocco's mosques whose roofs have green tiles.

The only decorated elements of the mosque are the exterior entrance and the minaret. The minaret, which has an octagonal shaft, is decorated in three tiers or registers, each featuring blind arches with either plain round, polylobyed, or lambrequin profiles. The highest tier also features square panels filled with zellij tiles. Red ochre colour is used for some further decorative details along, while the top of the minaret is whitewashed.

== See also ==
- List of mosques in Morocco
