= Ali al-Mandri =

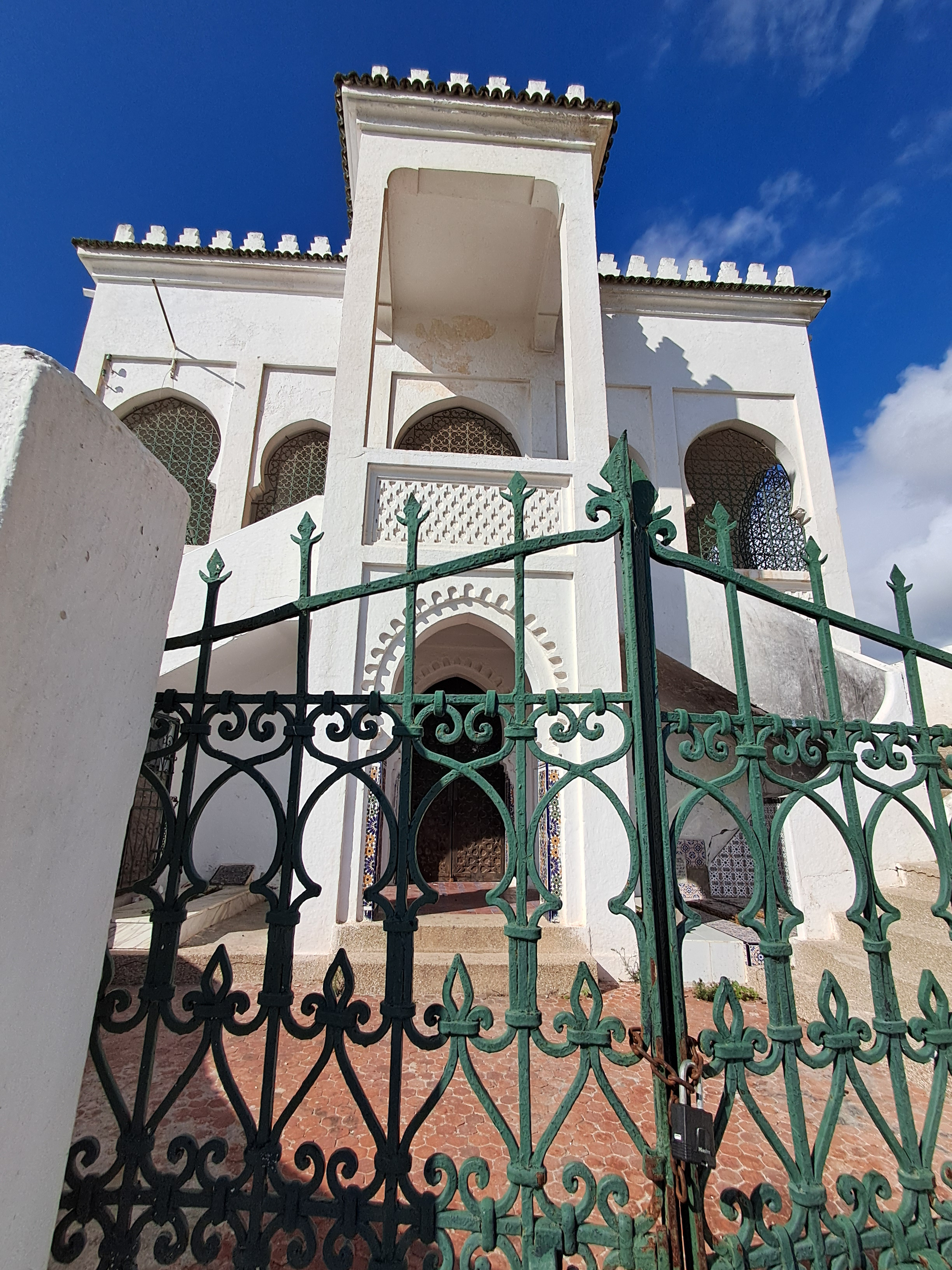
Mausoleum of Sidi Ali El-Mandri in Tetouan

Abu al-Hassan Ali al-Mandri al-Gharnati (Arabic: أبو الحسن علي المنظري, Portuguese: Alí Almenderim, Almendarim), also known as Almandari, Almandali, Al-Mandri I and Sidi al-Mandri, was the re-founder of the city of Tetouan in Morocco. He was born in Granada c. 1440 and died in Tétouan on an unknown date in between 1515 and 1541.

== Early life in al-Andalus ==
According to different sources, al-Mandri comes from a noble Andalusian family. Historian Gozalbes Busto believes that his family comes from Bedmar y Garcíez in the region of Jaen.

During the Granada War, al-Mandri belonged to the side of Boabdil, the last king of the Nasrid Kingdom of Granada. When the war started in 1482, he was holding the mayoralty of the fortress of Piñar, north east of Granada. According to 16th century Spanish chronicler Luis del Mármol Carvajal, al-Mandri was a captain of the troops loyal to Boabdil, a firm defender of the castle of Piñar until 1485 when it succumbed, either abandoned or surrendered, after the siege and conquest of the fortresses of Cambil and Alhabar. Portuguese historian David Lopes says of him that in Spain, "...it seems, [he] had played an important role in the struggles with the Christians of the Iberian Peninsula." Portuguese chronicles, those of Bernardo Rodriguez, Damião de Góis and Rui de Pina, situate him as a historical figure although the name of Almendarim refers both to him and to his grandson (or nephew), Sidi al-Mandri II.

Al-Mandri was married to Fatima, a noblewoman, niece of Aben Comixa and a relative of King Boabdil. When she was sent to celebrate her wedding with him in Tetouan, she was captured by Alonso de Cárdenas while trying to cross the river Genil. Conducted to Pinos Puente, where the Count of Tendilla awaited her arrest. She was kept in captivity in Alcalá la Real until she got released by mediation.

After the fall of the Nasrid Kingdom of Granada, he took refuge in Fnideq in the North of Morocco with an objective of avenging the loss of his native city Granada in al-Andalus and waiting for a quick return to the lost kingdom; something that would never happen.

== As re-founder of Tetouan ==
The city of Tetouan had just suffered major destructions on separate occasions during the 15th century. In 1399, Castilians burned down the city and enslaved its population in retaliation for piracy activities. An attack by the Portuguese, who had already captured Ceuta to the north, followed in 1436.

He is considered as the refounder of the city of Tetouan, a city already in ruins after its destruction. It is there where he took refuge with his troops and 400 members of the 32 noble Granadine families in the 1491 fleeing the Christian advance in the south of the Iberian Peninsula.

He later wrote to the founder and governor of the neighboring newly founded city of Chefchaouen, Ali ibn Rashid al-Alami asking him to send competent people to build a wall of protection for Tetouan. In exchange he put himself at the service of Ali Ibn Rashid, then lord of northern Morocco, who was in constant struggle with the Portuguese garrisons based in Ceuta. He later found himself facing the tribe of Beni Hozmar who wanted to impede the continuation of the works.

Ali al-Mandri is often confused with his grandson or nephew, Sidi al-Mandri II, who married Sayyida al-Hurra, daughter of Moulay Ali ibn Rashid al-Alami, to further strengthen and foment unity against the Iberians. This lady soon became a de facto vice-governor with her husband entrusting her the reins of power each trip he made outside the city. When the latter died in 1540, the population, who had become accustomed to seeing her exercise power, accepted her as a governor of Tétouan, giving her the title of al-Hurra.

== Sources ==
- Gozalbes Busto, Guillermo (1993). Al-Mandari, el granadino de Tetuán (in Spanish) (2nd ed.). El Autor. OCLC 31411063.
- Jara, Alfonso (1903). De Madrid á Tetuán (in Spanish). Est. Tip. de Ricardo Fé.
