= 1924 retreat from Chaoen =

Battle of the Rif War

1924 retreat from Chaouen
- Part of the Rif War
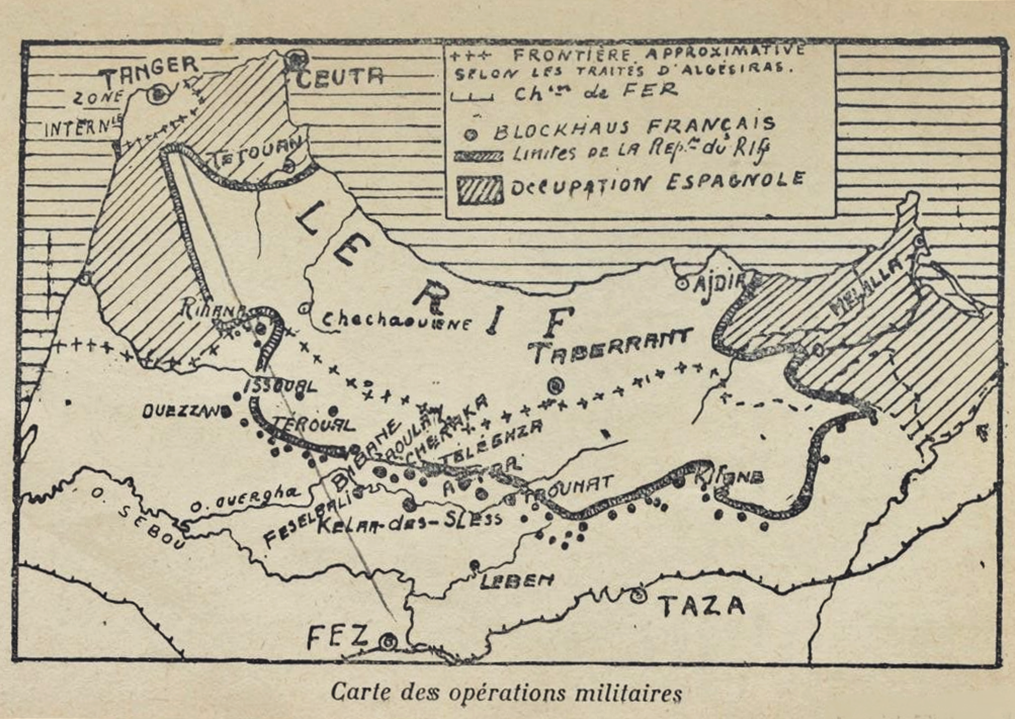
- Rif war map, where Tètouan and Chaouen (Chefchaouen) can be seen
Date	15 November – 13 December 1924
Location	Chefchaouen, Morocco
Result	Riffian victory

Belligerents
Republic of the Rif	Spain

Commanders and leaders
(Republic of the Rif) M'hamed el-Khattabi (Republic of the Rif) Ahmed Kheriro (Republic of the Rif) Mfadel Benaino (Republic of the Rif) Mohamed Bohout (Republic of the Rif) Driss Khouja (Republic of the Rif) Abdelkrim Ben Ali El Hattach	Alberto Castro Girona; Federico Berenguer (WIA); Colonel Ovila; General Julián Serrano Orive †; Francisco Franco

Strength
7,000 men	90,000+ men

Casualties and losses
Unknown	1,500 killed 460 missing 5,800 wounded or 17,000–20,000 killed and wounded

The 1924 retreat from Chaouen was the retreat of the Spanish forces from Chefchaouen during the Rif War. After the major defeat at Annual, the prime minister and the military dictator, Miguel Primo de Rivera, decided to withdraw his troops to the coast of Morocco. A major evacuation took place at Chaouen, where a relief force escorted the garrison to Tétouan. During their march, the Spanish suffered constant attacks by Riffian forces, suffering heavy casualties. The retreat was a disaster for the Spanish army, suffering another devastating loss in the war.

== Background ==
In the year 1921, the Spanish army suffered a crushing defeat at the Battle of Annual by the Rif forces of Abd el-Krim. After this victory, Abd el-Krim established a line of defense at the high elevations of Wadi Kart instead of pressing the attack on the Spanish coastal cities like Melilla, allowing the Spanish to reinforce and re-occupy the lowlands below. In 1923, the Spanish general Miguel Primo de Rivera launched a coup and took power as prime minister, establishing a military dictatorship.

On July 24, 1924, Primo de Rivera visited the Moroccan colony and inspected the frontlines. He also inspected the cities in the colony. Before his trip to Morocco, Primo had already decided to withdraw the Spanish army from Morocco, however, the Africanist faction strongly opposed this, including General Francisco Franco. In the end Primo decided to withdraw the army to the coasts to not make them vulnerable to the Riffians.

== Prelude ==
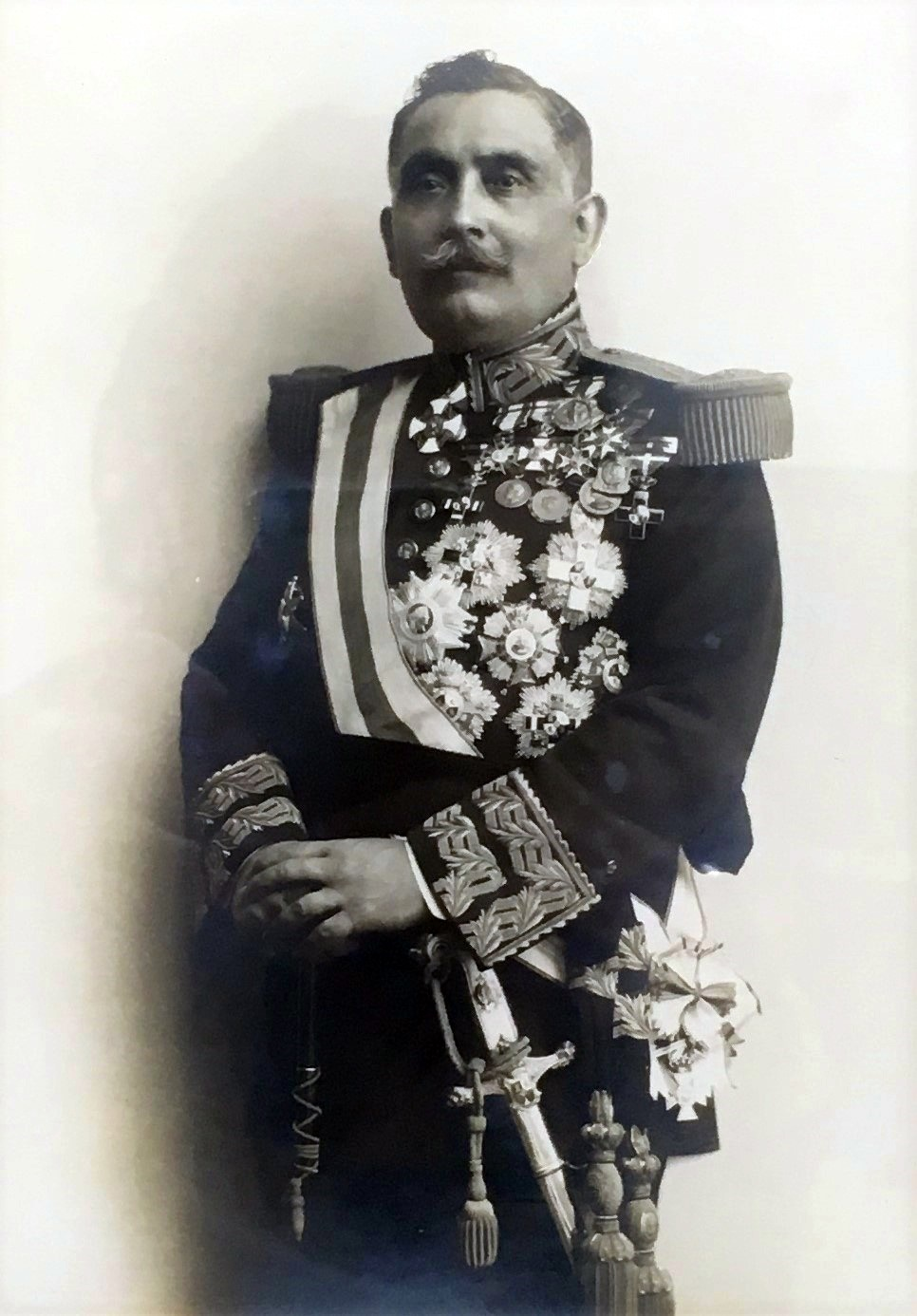
Castro Girona

The long-awaited withdrawal finally began in September 1924; M’ter and Wad Lau were evacuated on September 8, followed by the evacuation of Alcacer Quiber to Tangiers. The only major evacuation took place at Chaoen, which had a garrison of 10,000 men and needed escort to Tétouan. On September 16, the relief was carried by the generals, Alberto Castro Girona and Federico Berenguer who managed to capture the undefended heights of Gorgues. Having Gorgues secured, the main army marched south to the valleys of Beni Hassan on the 23rd. A column from Larache was supposed to arrive but it never did, as soon as they marched, they were attacked by unaffiliated Riffians, causing them heavy losses, and retreated.

The relief force of Tetuan consisted of three flanks; the left was led by Castro Girona, the middle by Colonel Ovila, and the right by General Serrano. Federico Berenguer led the reserve forces. The relief force under Serrano successfully reached Chefchaoun on 30 September, followed by the other generals later. The main body of the relief army rested while others scouted the area. No major attack by the Riffians, but their snipers existed everywhere, hunting any Spanish in their sight.

== Retreat ==
On the night of November 15, the Spanish army evacuated Chaoen quietly without being alarmed by the Riffians. Castro Girona led the advanced guard, who reached Zoco el Arba on the 18th. The remaining troops, more than 40,000 men, were between Zoco and Chefchaoun. The rear guard was led by Franco, who left the base on the 17th. As the Spanish were retreating, the Riffians were watching their movements, and, on the 19th, a heavy storm and rains slowed down the Spanish march. A strong Riffian force of 7,000 men, led by Abd el-Krim, was waiting for this moment. They attacked the Spanish with full might.

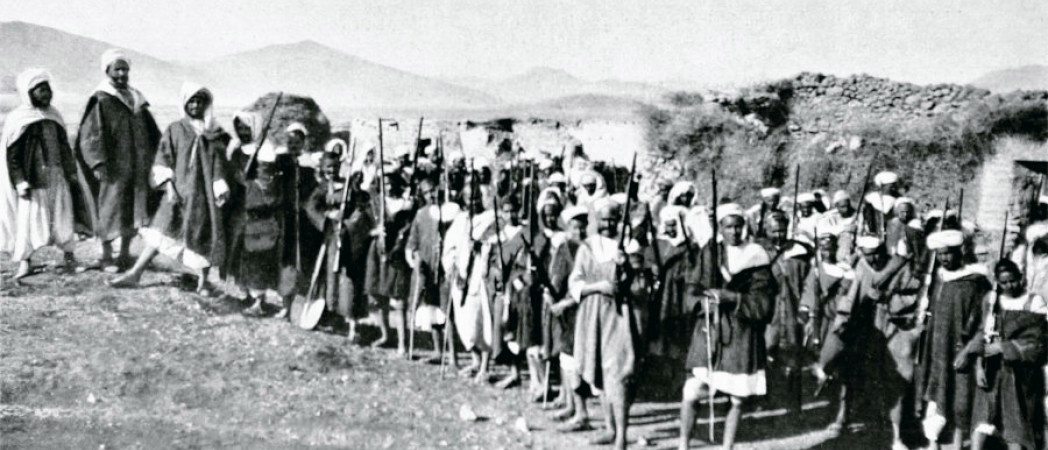
Riffian men

The Spanish had to fight their way while Castro's advanced guard was lucky to reach the reserve station at Beni Karrich. At Dar Coba, the Spanish were annihilated, and on Sheruta, General Serrano and 1,000 men were killed. The rest reached Zoco, where they decided to rest after heavy combat. For three weeks, the Spanish were surrounded at Zoco, preparing to resume their march. The Riffian forces attacked them daily and frequently, inflicting heavy losses. This was due to supply problems; many of the Spanish were inexperienced and were in low morale.

At Wad Nakhla, three armored vehicles were covering the retreat; they were ambushed and held for three days; after that, only 6 soldiers out of 14 survived and were taken prisoners, where they were praised by Abd el-Krim for their bravery. During the retreat, the wounded soldiers who lay in the mud were killed by the Riffians. Arriving at Wad Habana, the Riffians easily picked off any Spanish on their sight. Desperate fighting occurred, and the last column that arrived at Tetuan was reinforced by airplanes and forces from Tetuan. The Spanish march finally ended on December 13. The victorious Riffians chased them and killed 500 of Franco's troops.

== Aftermath ==
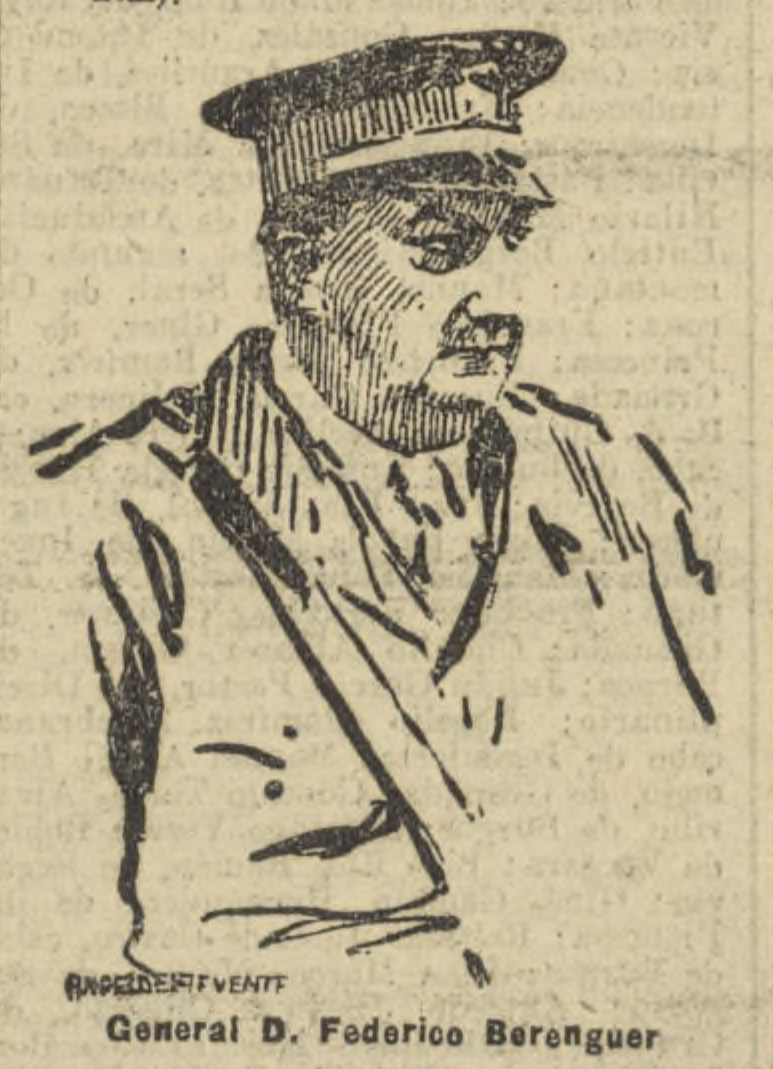
Federico Berenguer

Spanish casualties during the retreat were severe, numbering between 1,500 killed, 460 missing in action and 5,800 injured , or 17,000-20,000 killed and injured. Federico Berenguer was wounded on the march. Riffian casualties are not known. The retreat from Chaoen was a disaster for the Spanish; the Arab and the Berber tribes were united under Abd el-Krim's leadership, the prestige of the Riffians went high, and the rebellion was running at full tide. The capture of Chaoen and the partial destruction of the relief force gave the Riffians a large number of weapons and supplies. The Riffian state doubled in size. The Spanish and the French watched for unpleasant events to come.

== Sources ==
- Fleming, Shannon E.; Fleming, Ann K. (1977). "Primo de Rivera and Spain's Moroccan Problem, 1923-27". Journal of Contemporary History. 12 (1). Sage Publications, Ltd.: 85–99. ISSN 0022-0094. JSTOR 260238.
- Jaques, Tony (2006). Dictionary of Battles and Sieges [3 volumes]. Westport, Conn: Bloomsbury Publishing USA. ISBN 978-0-313-02799-4.
- Pennell, C. R. (2000). Morocco Since 1830. London: C. Hurst & Co. ISBN 978-1-85065-273-1.
- Quiroga, Alejandro (2025). The People's Dictator: The Life of General Primo de Rivera. Abingdon, Oxon; New York, NY: Routledge. doi:10.4324/9781032691848. ISBN 978-1-032-69181-7.
- Woolman, David S. (1968). Rebels in the Rif. Stanford University Press. ISBN 978-0-8047-0664-3.
- Wyrtzen, Jonathan (2016). Making Morocco. Ithaca: Cornell University Press. ISBN 978-1-5017-0424-6.
