= Sab'ab Atwat =

Novel by Abdelkrim Ghallab

Saba'at 'abwab ("Seven Gates") is a 1965 autobiographical novel by Moroccan novelist Abdelkrim Ghallab.
