= Sayyida al Hurra =

16th-century Moroccan ruler of Tétouan and privateer

Aisha bint Ali ibn Rashid al-Alami عائشة بنت علي بن رشيد العلمي
- Lalla

Queen consort of Morocco
- Tenure: 1541–1545, 1547–1549

Governor of Tétouan
- Rule: 1515/1519 – 1542
- Predecessor: Sidi al-Mandri II
- Born: c. 1491–1495; Chefchaouen, Morocco
- Died: 1552-1562; Chefchaouen, Morocco
- Spouse: Sidi al-Mandri II (m. 1501; died 1515); Abu al-Abbas Ahmad ibn Muhammad (m. 1541; died 1549)
- Dynasty: Wattasid (by marriage)
- Father: Ali ibn Rashid al-Alami
- Mother: Lalla Zohra Fernandez
- Religion: Sunni Islam

Lalla ʿĀʾisha bint ʿAlī ibn Rāshid al-ʿAlamī (Arabic: عائشة بنت علي بن رشيد العلمي), (Note: "It is unknown whether hurra is the title given to her or if it was her name at birth. When Ibn Asker mentions an incident, he identifies her as Hurra bint Ali b. Rashid, the ruler of Tétouan. See (İbn Asker, 1977). In the account of her marriage to the Wattasid sultan, her name is given as Hurra bint Amir Sayyid Abu al-Hasan Ali b. Musa b. Rashid al-Sharif. See el-Fâsî (2008); Salawi (1997). Tıtvani (Tetouani) mentioned her as Sittu'l-hurra and claimed her name was Aisha. See Tétouani (1959). It has also been suggested that her name could be Fatima, that the name Aisha and the title Hurra belonged to the mother of the last Sultan of Granada, and that her father may have given this name and title to Sayyida Hurra, the subject of this article, in her honor. See Lebbady (2012).") commonly known as Sayyida al-Ḥurra (السيدة الحرة, transl. The Lady, the Free lady), was a Moroccan privateer who governed the city of Tétouan from 1515 to 1542. As the wife of Moroccan king Abu al-Abbas Ahmad ibn Muhammad, who was her second husband, she belonged to the Wattasid dynasty. She is considered to be "one of the most important female figures of the Islamic West in the modern age."

Her exact date of birth is unknown, but various sources estimate her to be born somewhere between 1491-1495. Likewise, there is a lot of discussion surrounding her death; some say she died in 1552, while others place her death a decade later (1561, 1562).

The era of her life and career was largely marked by a widespread struggle between the Christian world and the Muslim world: the Ottoman Empire had conquered Constantinople in 1453, ending the Eastern Byzantine Empire; the Portuguese Empire had begun conquering ports along the western Moroccan coast around 1487; and the Reconquista had returned the Iberian Peninsula to European Christian rule by 1492, eventually leading to the expulsion or forced conversion of Muslims in Spain.

Al-Hurra split control over the Mediterranean Sea with her ally Hayreddin Barbarossa, an Ottoman corsair who operated in the east while she operated in the west. In 1515, she became the last person in Muslim history to legitimately hold the title "al-Hurra" following the death of her first husband Sidi al-Mandri II, who ruled Tétouan. Her marriage to her second husband marks the only time in Moroccan history that a king married away from the capital city Fez, as al-Hurra refused to leave Tétouan.

== Early life and family ==
Sayyida al Hurra was born in Chefchaouen around 1491 and 1495 or precisely in 1491, to a prominent Muslim family of Andalusian nobles, who were expelled to Morocco after the fall of Granada, at the end of the Reconquista and settled in Chefchaouen. Her parents were Ali ibn Rashid al-Alami, the founder and emir of Chefchaouen and Lalla Zohra Fernandez from Vejer de la Frontera near Cadiz. A Sharifian, she was a descendant of the Moroccan Sufi saint Abd al-Salam ibn Mashish al-Alami, and through him of Hasan ibn Ali.

Sayyida's childhood was happy and secure, yet clouded by constant reminders of the forced exile from Granada. During her childhood, she was exposed to a first-class education, and involved with the fate of her people. She was fluent in several languages which included Castilian Spanish and Portuguese. The famous Moroccan scholar Abdallah al-Ghazwani was one of her many teachers. She was married at age 16 to a man 30 years her senior, Sidi al-Mandri II, a grandson or nephew of Ali al-Mandri who was a friend of her father and re-founder and governor of the city of Tétouan, himself an Andalusian Moorish refugee. She was promised to her husband when she was still a child. Tétouan, a city resurrected by Andalusian exiles after Spanish destruction, became central to the political career of Sayyida later in life.

== Career ==
=== Governor of Tétouan ===
An intelligent woman, Al Hurra learned much whilst assisting her husband in his business affairs. She was a de facto vice-governor, with her husband entrusting the reins of power to her each time he made a trip outside the city. When he died in 1515, the population, who had become accustomed to seeing her exercise power, accepted her as a governor of Tétouan, giving her the title of al-Hurra. A (central) power vacuum emerged amidst the Moors influx into Morocco, meanwhile the city of Tétouan blossomed under its new citizens, leading to the creation of its own administration. From Tétouan al-Hurra held a strategic position not only for helping Moorish refugees, but also in enabling the city to become a privateering hub.

Spanish and Portuguese sources describe al-Hurra as "their partner in the diplomatic game". The acceptance of al-Hurra's rule cannot be explained solely by Andalusian traditions regarding female authority and inheritance. Her political skill, diplomatic influence, and successful leadership of Tetouan likely played an important role in consolidating and maintaining her legitimacy among her subjects." Others believe that al-Hurra succeeded as governor because she was "the undisputed leader of pirates of the western Mediterranean". According to the Moroccan historian Muhammad Ibn Azzuz Hakim she was ‘the only woman to have held sovereign power in Morocco".

In 1541, she accepted a marriage proposal from Ahmed al-Wattasi, a Sultan of the Moroccan Wattasid dynasty, who traveled from Fez to Tétouan to marry her. Her marriage with him was the only recorded instance of a Moroccan king marrying outside of his capital. This occurred because al-Hurra was not ready to give up her role as ruler of Tétouan or even to leave the city for the marriage ceremony, forcing al-Wattasi to come to her. Although she gained political support through this new alliance, Sayyida al-Hurra insisted on showing everybody that she was not going to give up governing Tétouan despite being married to the Sultan. Besides the unique choice for the location of their marriage ceremony, it was an uncommon practice for a man to marry a widowed woman. It was her power, resources, and diplomatic expertise to help strengthen unity in the northern region, that offered the sultan security.

Sayyida al-Hurra lived a life of adventure and romance. She appointed her brother Moulay Ibrahim as vizier to Ahmed al-Wattasi, Sultan of Fez, and this placed the Rashidis as major players in the effort to unify Morocco against the fast-growing powers of Spain and Portugal.

=== Barbary piracy ===
Coming from Andalusian beginnings, Sayyida became a true symbol for the Northern Moroccan frontier in the ongoing struggle against the Iberian expansionism. She could neither forget nor forgive the humiliation of being forced to flee Granada. In her wish to take revenge on the "Christian enemy", she turned to piracy. She made contact with the legendary Ottoman admiral Hayreddin Barbarossa of Algiers. Piracy provided a quick income, "booty and ransom for captives", and also helped to keep alive the dream of returning to Andalusia. She was well respected by her Christian enemies as a "queen" who had power over the western Mediterranean Sea, and over the release of Portuguese and Spanish captives. For example, in The Forgotten Queens of Islam Fatima Mernissi mentions Spanish historical documents of 1540, according to which there were negotiations "between the Spaniards and Sayyida al-Hurra" following a successful pirating operation in Gibraltar in which the Muslim pirates took "much booty and many prisoners".

== Later life ==
After she had ruled for 30 years, her son-in-law Muhammad al-Hassan al-Mandri, who was the governor of Fnideq, overthrew her in October 1542. According to the Yemen Times, "she was stripped of her property and power". Accepting her fate, al-Hurra retired to Chefchaouen, from where she dedicated her time to religious work. It is said that she died in 1552, near her father's house in Chefchaouen.

== Legacy ==
Muslim female historical figures such as Sayyida al-Hurra, despite their prominence are often reduced to historical footnotes, or even written out of history. Specifically the way she is represented in historical sources becomes clear in the ambiguity of documentation on specific events. As such, one could argue that her story is part of a bigger trend where historical female narratives and representations have been reconstructed.

In a 2024 study that attempts to revise this case study, local Moroccan historians points this lack of documentation to the fact that "Arab historians were not interested in writing about her during her own time, although she has continued to be known in her home city." Moreover, suggesting that society upheld traditional gender roles, an thus not celebrating female leadership. A factor that was specific to the 16th century and Early Modern period, was a sentiment that women were physically and intellectually inferior to men. This can also explain how this era was "no place where women could construct distinctive identities, or forge their names in history like their male counterparts".

She was known across Europe and the Islamic world for her nautical dominance and her time as governor of Tétouan stands as a testament to her legacy.

One of al-Hurra's (family's) physical legacy's and places where she is actively remembered, is the Qasbah, a former fortress built as defence against the Portuguese threat, that belonged to her father.

== Sources ==
- Utku, Nihal Şahin (2025-12-29). "Sayyida Hurra: The Conceptual Representation of Femininity, Nobility, Freedom, and Authority in Islamic History". KADEM Kadın Araştırmaları Dergisi. 11 (2): 291–328. doi:10.21798//kadem.2025.185. ISSN 2149-4878.
