= Abdulkareem Baba Aminu =

Nigerian journalist

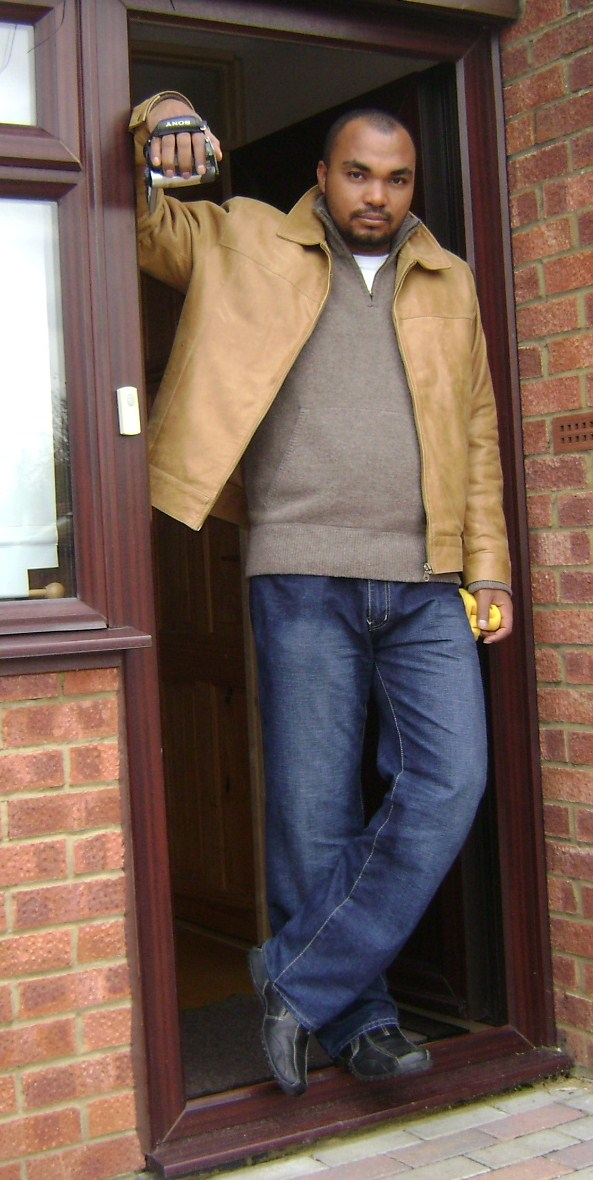
- Born: 7 July 1977 (age 49); Kaduna
- Citizenship: Nigeria
- Occupations: Journalist, Screenwriter, Retail worker, Painter, Animator

Abdulkareem Baba Aminu (born Kaduna, 7 July 1977) is a Nigerian journalist, cartoonist, comicbook artist and retailer, painter, writer, poet and culture critic.

Baba Aminu is a commentator on culture. He was one of four judges for KORA Music Awards.

== Early life and career ==
Born in Kaduna, Nigeria, on 7 July 1977, Baba Aminu soon began to scribble and doodle as a child, eventually going on to write an op-ed column for Classique Magazine at age 12.

Later, while in secondary school, he created two weekly cartoon strips for the Saturday and Sunday editions of The Democrat, a national daily. The characters, Bala and Kareema, became popular and were used by Peugeot Automobiles Nigeria to endorse their then-new 306 model.

Baba Aminu went to the Ahmadu Bello University in Zaria, for a degree in Business Administration, while pursuing a career as a studio painter. He has exhibited in several group shows and one solo. Twelve of his paintings are included in the National Assembly Art Collection in Abuja, Nigeria.

During his final year in university, he was employed by Weekly Trust, a major Nigerian newspaper. After a stint as a reporter, he became the Entertainment Editor and eventually the editor of the magazine section of the paper. During that time, he scored many exclusive interviews with Nigerian and international stars.

On his approach to work, Baba Aminu told a Nigerian newspaper in an interview:

“I have a healthy interest in stories and investigations into issues that seem to slip through the cracks and are forgotten by mainstream media. Even when it comes to entertainment stories, which some people believe are fluff, I look for previously-unseen angles. Oftentimes, I take weeks and even months researching a story before writing it for publication.”

For two years – with the help of the internet and long-distance phone calls - Baba Aminu was also the Special Features Editor of now-defunct Komikwerks.com, then a leading U.S-based publisher of both webcomics and regular comic books.

Baba Aminu was part of a Federal Government Monitoring Team in Togo, during that country’s controversial 2005 elections, where he “faced death many times trying to escape back to Nigeria after the elections turned violent.” The resulting travelogue, called ‘Escape from Togo’ was published May 2005.

For his investigative journalism work, Baba Aminu was nominated for ‘Journalist of the Year’ at the 2006 edition of the Future Awards Nigeria. The following year, he was nominated again and he won.

Baba Aminu was Acting Editor of the Abuja, Nigeria-based influential Weekly Trust newspaper for over two years, from late 2008 and was made substantive Editor in July 2010, until recently being promoted to Creative Editor overseeing all Media Trust publications. He returned for a second tenure as editor, for five years, before he retired early from the newsroom in October 2020. He is a member of Daily Trust's Editorial Board, and also writes a weekly column called Column No. 6 for the newspaper.

Baba Aminu was a writer on the BBC-produced Wetin Dey, the number one TV show in Nigeria while it ran for two seasons. The production saw him team up with notable young Nigerian movie directors like Mak 'Kusare, Kenneth Gyang and Seke Somolu. As a result of a very good professional and personal relationship, 'Kusare was tapped by Y!Magazine to write about Baba Aminu in the publication's annual "Freedom Issue" in 2010. The magazine also added Baba Aminu to its annual list of '50 Young People Who Will Change Nigeria'.

Notable TV appearances by Baba Aminu include a November 2012 episode of Close-Up, a movie industry variety TV show running on M-NET's Africa Magic channel where he was interviewed by host Keppy Ekpenyong Bassey.

Baba Aminu was one of the co-owners of Planet Comics, Nigeria’s first comic book store. The store was closed due to both owners' busy schedules.
