= Abdelkarim Tabbal =

Moroccan poet

Abdelkarim Tabbal (born 1931 in Chefchaouen, Morocco) is a Moroccan poet.

Tabbal first published his poems in 1952 in the magazine Al-Anis. His poems are distinguishable for their use of rhyme and metaphor, giving a musical character to the poetry.

== Bibliography ==
- al-A'mâl al-kâmila. al-Dawâwîn al-shi' riyya (2 Vols.). Manshűrât Wizârat al-Thaqâfa wa-l-Ittis:âl, 2000.
- al-Ashyâ´ al-munkasara. Casablanca: Dâr al-Nashr al-Magribiyya, 1974.
- al-Bustân. (the garden) Chefchaouen: S.E., 1988.
- Al-Qabd: 'alá al-mâ´., Kenitra: Al-Bűkîlî lil-T:ibâ` wa Nashr wa-l-Tawzî`, 1996.
- al-T:arîq ilá l-insân, Tetuán: Mat:ba'a Krîmâdîs, 1971.
- Alá 'ataba al-bah:r., Qenitra: Al-Bűkîlî li-l-T:ibâ`a wa-Nashr wa-l-Tawzî`, 2000.
- `Alâ `ataba al-bah:r, Afâq, 1999, 61-62 329-331.
- Ba'da al-djalaba., Tánger: Wikâla Shirâ` li-l-Jidmât al-I`lâm wa-l-Ittisâl, 1998.
- Canción de un marzo triste, AMADO, Jose María ed., 15 siglos de poesía árabe.Granada: Litoral, 1988
- Farâshât hâriba. 2004.Autobiographical novel about his childhood and youth (1936-1956)
- Kitâb al-'inâya, Mishkât (26), 95-121. 97.
- Lawh:ât mâ´iyya, Chauen: Azîl Nîkűs, 1997.
- Shadjar al-Bayd:â´, Chauen: Amzîl Nîkűs, 1995.
- Three poems, Banipal, 1999, 5 43-43.
- Âbir al-sabîl, Chefchaouen: al-Madjlis al-Baladî, 1993.
- Âjar al-masâ´ (the end of the afternoon), Chauen: Mat:ba`a Al-Nahdj, 1994.
