= Abdelkrim Ghallab =

Moroccan journalist (1919-2017)

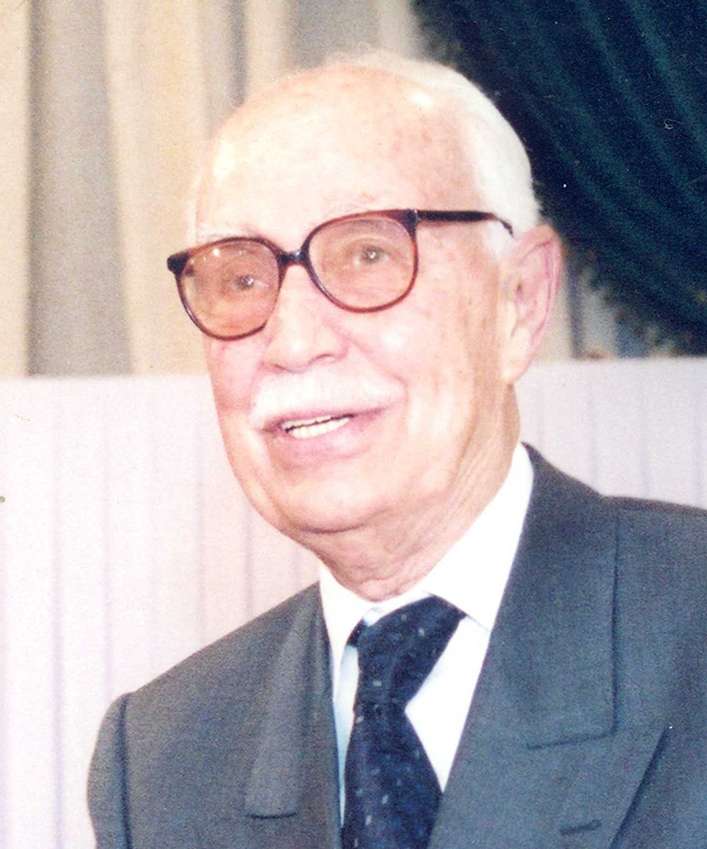
Abdelkrim Ghallab

Abdelkrim Ghallab (Arabic: عبد الكريم غلاب, romanized: ʿAbd al-Karīm Ghallāb; December 31, 1919, in Fes – August 14, 2017, in El Jadida) was a Moroccan political journalist, cultural commentator, and novelist. He is an important figure both in the literary and political field (editor of the Istiqlal Party daily al-Alam).

== Early life ==
He studied both at the University of Al-Karaouine in Fez and at the University of Cairo, where he took his M.A. in Arabic literature. He is the author of five novels and three collections of short stories. Among his best known novels are Sab'ab Atwat ("Seven Gates", 1965) and Dafann al-m'd ("We buried the past", 1966); the latter is praised as representative of a new school of writing called "nationalist realism". According to Simon Gikandi his Arabic style is known for its "graceful and at times scholarly classicism".

== Career ==
In 2004 he was awarded the Maghreb Culture prize of Tunis. His work has been translated in many languages. Abdelkrim Ghallab died in El Jadida on August 14, 2017, aged 97.

== Bibliography ==
- al-A'mâl al-kâmila (5 Volumes). Manshűrât Wizârat al-Thaqâfa wa-l-Ittis:âl, 2001.

The first volume includes: Mât qarîr al-'ayn (I will die comforted, 1965); al-Sudd; al-Ard: h:abibatî (my beloved earth, 1971); Waajradja-hâ min al-djanna (la sacó of paradise, 1971); Hâdhâ al-wadjh a'rifu-hâ (Conozco ese rostro, 1971).

The second volume is about the auto-biographical novel and includes: Sab'a abwâb (seven doors, 1984); Sifr al-takwîn (Génesis, 1996) and al-Shayjűja al-z:âlima (La injusta vejez, 1999).

The third volume, (novels) includes: Dafannâ al-mâd:î (The past is buried, 1966) and al-Mu' allim ' Alî (Ali the teacher).

The fourth volume includes: S:abâh:.. wa-yazh:af al-layl (For tomorrow...and the face of the night, 1984).

The fifth volume includes: Wa-'âda al-zawraq ilá al-nab (la barca volvió à la fuente, 1989) and Shurűh: fî l-marâyâ (Comentarios en el espejo, 1994).

- Nabadat Fikr
- Fi Athaqafa wa Al Adab
- Fi Al Fikr A-ssiassi

Novels

- Dafana Al Madi
- Lem'allem Ali
- Akhrajaha mina Al Janna
- Charqia fi baris (An oriental woman in Paris)

Translations in French

- Le Passé enterré, (trad. Francis Gouin), Publisud, coll. « Confluents », Paris, 1990, ISBN 2-86600-324-1
