= Chefchaouen =

Chefchaouen Arabic: شفشاون Standard Moroccan Tamazight: ⵛⴼⵛⴰⵡⵏ
- City
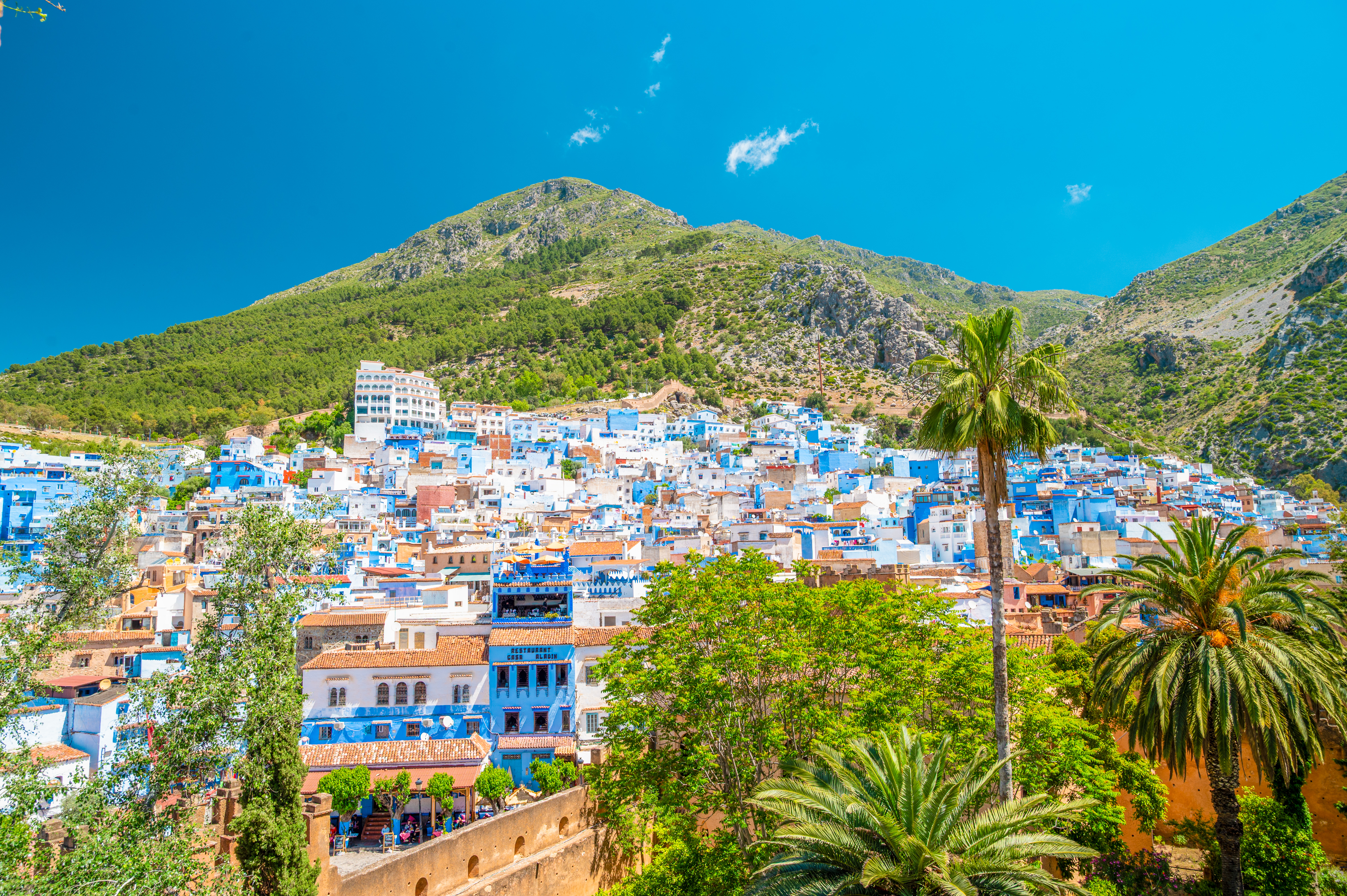
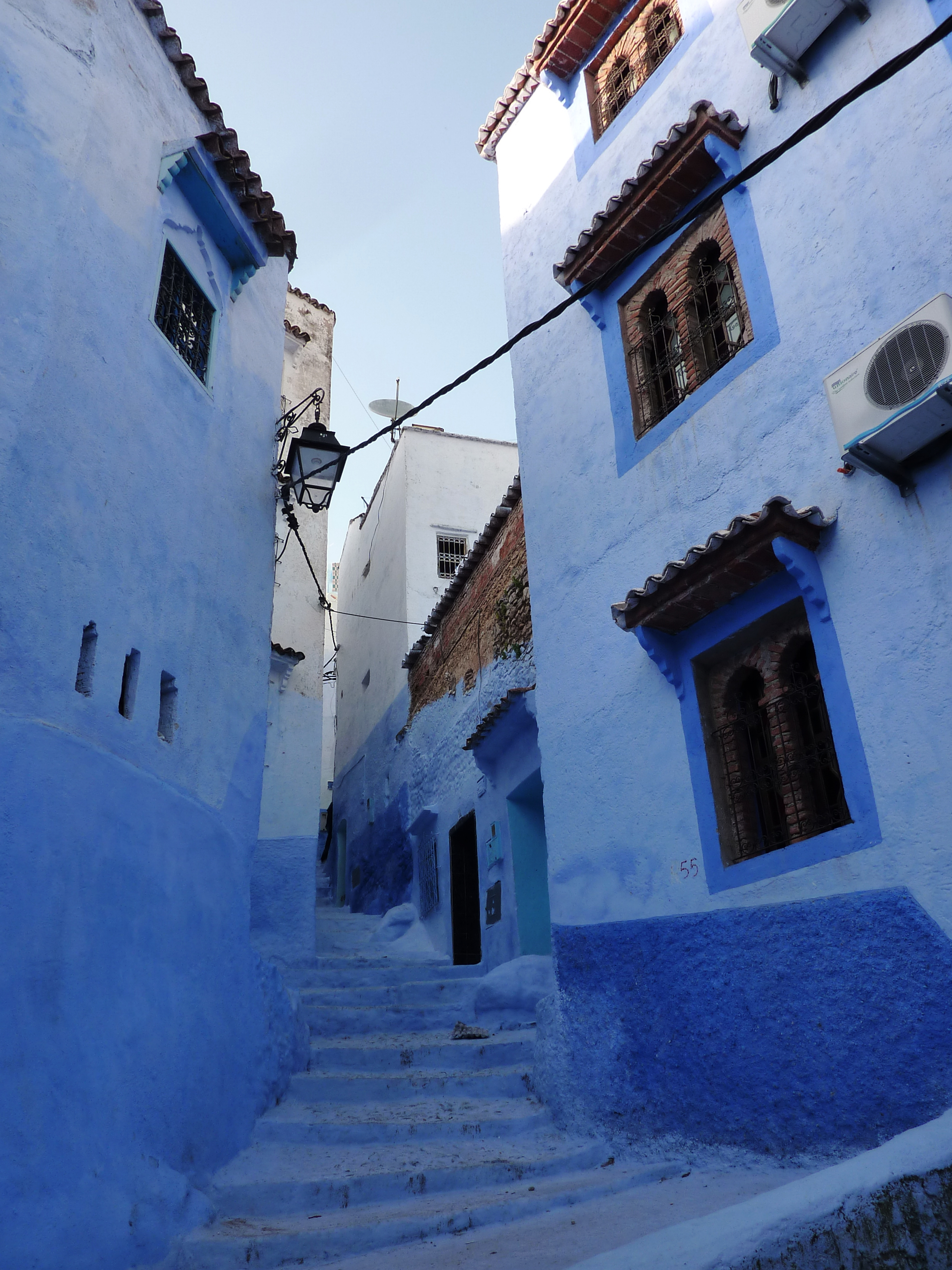
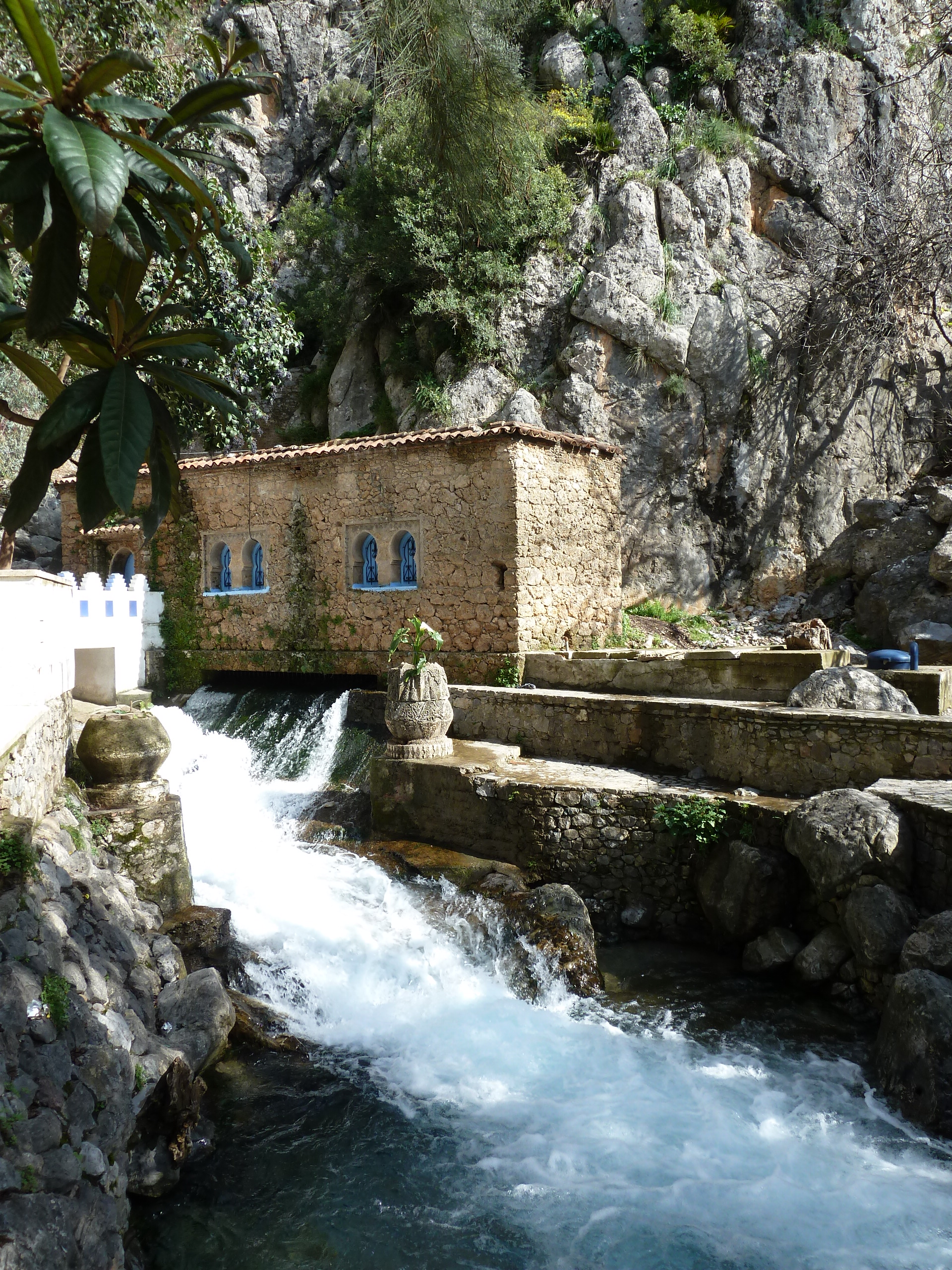
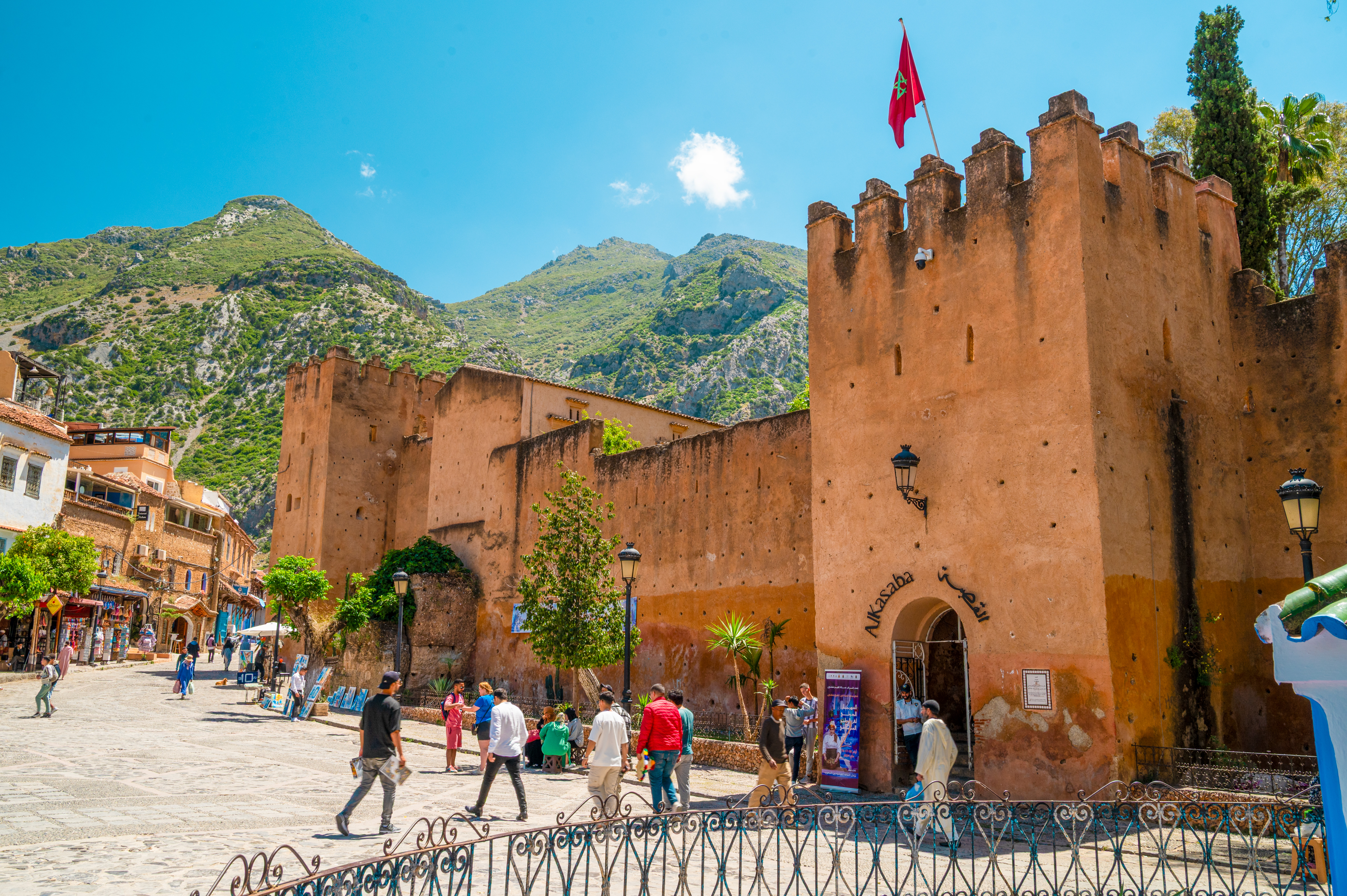
- Clockwise from top: Overall view of the city; Ras al Ma' stream; Uta Hammam Square and the Kasbah; one of the blue-painted streets in the medina

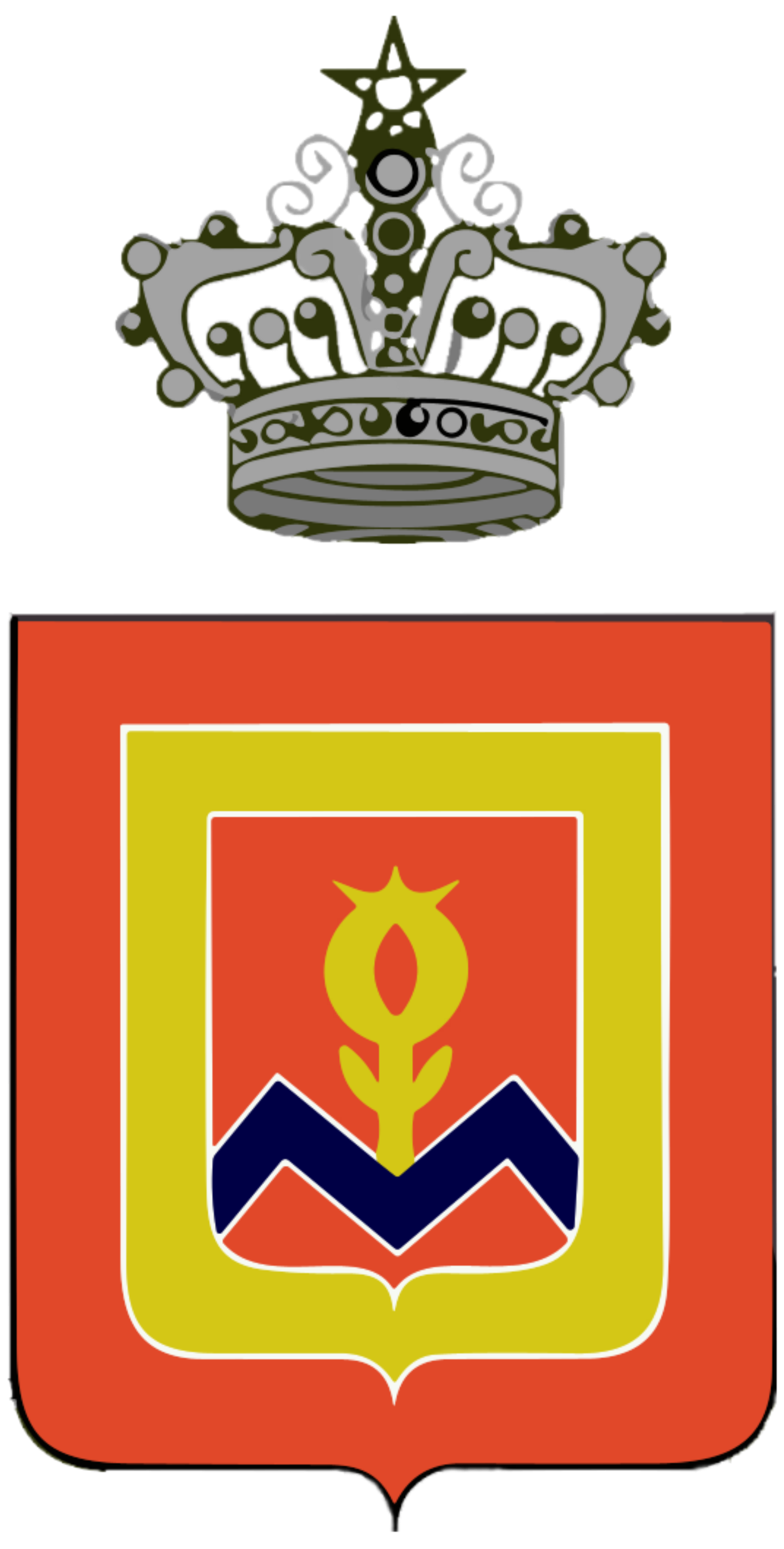
- Seal
- Nicknames: The Blue Pearl (الجوهرة الزرقاء)
- Interactive map of Chefchaouen
- Coordinates: 35°10′17″N 5°16′11″W
- Country: Morocco
- Region: Tangier-Tetouan-Al Hoceima
- Province: Chefchaouen
- Founded: 1471

Government
  - Governor: Mhamed Haddan
  - Mayor: Mohamed Said al-Alami
- Elevation: 564 m (1,850 ft)

Population (2024)
  - Total: 46,168
- Time zone: UTC+0 (GMT)
- Postal code: 91000

Chefchaouen (Note: Arabic: شفشاون, romanized: Shafshāwan, IPA: [ʃafˈʃaːwan] Standard Moroccan Tamazight: ⵛⴼⵛⴰⵡⵏ) is a city in northwest Morocco. It is the chief town of the province of the same name and is noted for its buildings in shades of blue, for which it is nicknamed the "Blue City". It is situated in a mountainous region in northern Morocco, between Tétouan and Ouazzane.

It was founded in 1471 by the Mulay Ali ibn Rashid, a distant descendant of the Islamic Prophet Muhammad. The original settlement consisted of just a small fortress, now referred to as Chefchaouen's Kasbah. The fortress was erected to help defend the area from potential attacks by Portuguese invaders; at the time, Portugal was launching attacks against northern cities and towns in Morocco.

== Etymology ==
The name "Chefchaouen" is of Arabic and Berber origin coming from "Chef” (Arabic: شاف, romanized: shāf), a derivation of the Arabic word “to look”, and the Berber term “Echaouen", meaning “antlers” or “horns” and is a term used to indicate the peak of mountains. Chefchaouen thus means 'look at the horns', referring to the two mountain peaks overlooking the area. Nowadays, Chefchaouen is known as "the Blue Pearl" of Morocco, known for its traditional houses painted in blue and white. It is also colloquially known as Chaouen (Arabic: شاون, romanized: Shāwan; Standard Moroccan Tamazight: ⵛⴰⵡⵏ, romanized: Shāwn).

== History ==
The city was founded in 1471 (876 AH) as a small kasbah (fortress) by Ali ibn Rashid al-Alami, a descendant of Abd al-Salam ibn Mashish al-Alami and Idris I. Al-Alami built the kasbah to defend against Portuguese invasions of northern Morocco. Along with the Ghomaras of the region, many Andalusi Muslims, Moriscos and Spanish and Portuguese Jews settled here during and after the Reconquista, when Spanish Christians conquered what remained of al-Andalus, the Muslim-controlled parts of the Iberian Peninsula.

Ali Ben, or ibn, Rashid was born in Gherzoim, a nearby village, in c. 1440 (844 AH). He went to the Emirate of Granada in 1460 and distinguished himself in battle against Christian forces. He settled in Chefchaouen c. 1465 and, due to his experience as a warrior, was chosen as successor to his cousin ibn Abi Jum'ah and leader of the mujahideen in the northwest of Morocco. He fought alongside the emir of Tétouan, Ali al-Mandri, who married his daughter, the mujahida Aisha al-Hurra. The latter, known by her title, Sayyida al-Hurra, ruled Chefchaouen through a rapid period of growth and development.

The pressure of the Reconquista and the fall of Granada in 1492 led many of its inhabitants to immigrate to Morocco over several centuries. The last Moriscos (descendants of Iberian Muslims) were expelled from Spain by Philip III in 1609. Some of these refugees chose to settle in the large cities of Fes, Marrakesh, Tlemcen, Tunis, and Kairouan, while others settled in the jihadist fortress of Chefchaouen, which was in a fierce war against Portuguese armies. They established their quarters on the rugged slopes of the mountains and built their own residential quarters in the Andalusi architectural style, very similar to the traditional quarters of Granada. In a few decades, the fortress of Chefchaouen turned into a prosperous new city, in which the Andalusi-Granadan culture merged with the culture of the Ghomaras. The urban expansion included military fortifications such as walls with about ten gates and the construction of several mosques including the Great Mosque. The Andalusi community that settled in the city also included several well-known poets and philosophers.

In October 1920, General Dámaso Berenguer occupied the city for the Spanish protectorate in Morocco. Following the Spanish retreat from the city, Chefchaouen was part of the Republic of the Rif led by Abd el-Krim from 1924 to 1926. In September 1925, in the middle of the Rif War, a rogue squadron of American volunteer pilots, the Lafayette Escadrille, bombarded civilians in the city. Colonel Charles Sweeny had proposed the idea to French Prime Minister Paul Painlevé, who "warmly welcomed the Colonel's request." After el-Krim was defeated with the help of the French, he was deported to Réunion. The Spanish Army retook the city in 1926.

Morocco gained its independence from colonial rule in 1956. Chefchaouen and most of the northern parts of the country were ceded by Spain that year.

== Geography ==
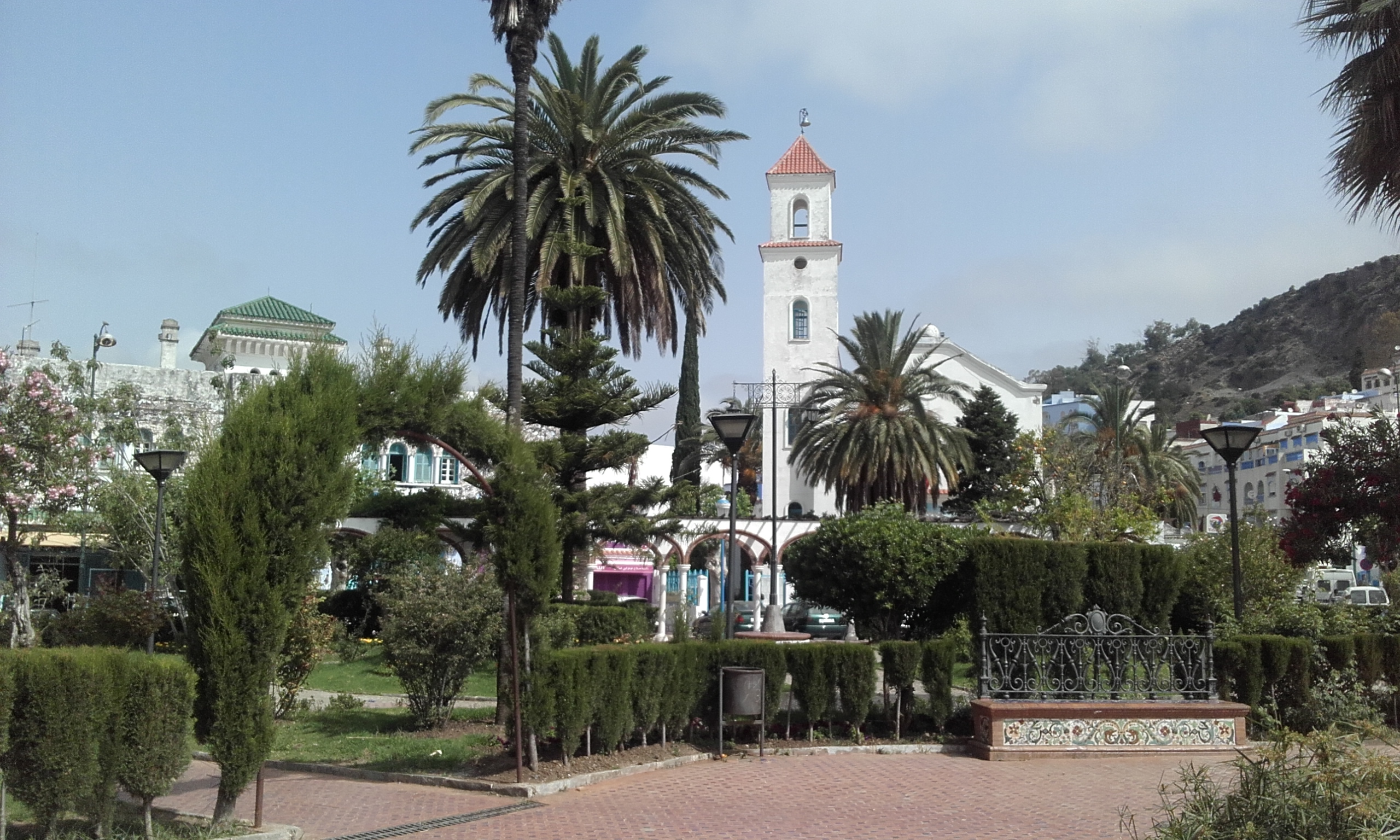
Central square and garden of Chefchaouen, outside the Medina

The city of Chefchaouen is located at about 600 metres (2,000 ft) above sea level in the foothills of the Kaʻala mountain in the western part of the Rif mountain range, in northwestern Morocco. The city consists of a Medina, the historical walled town, and a new town that has grown outside the former city walls.

== Climate ==
Due to its location in the Rif Mountains at an elevation of approximately 600 m (2,000 ft), Chefchaouen experiences a Mediterranean climate. According to precipitation records from the Chefchaouen meteorological station, annual precipitation ranged from approximately 500 mm to nearly 1,900 mm during the period 2000–2020.

== Demographics ==
According to the last census of the Moroccan population (2024), the municipality of Chefchaouen had a population of 46,168. According to the 2024 Moroccan census, 99.2% of the population of Chefchaouen spoke Arabic as their native language, while 0.6% spoke Berber languages natively. The original population of Chefchaouen were Andalusian Arabs and Spanish Jews and it was later populated by nearby Berbers.

== Culture ==
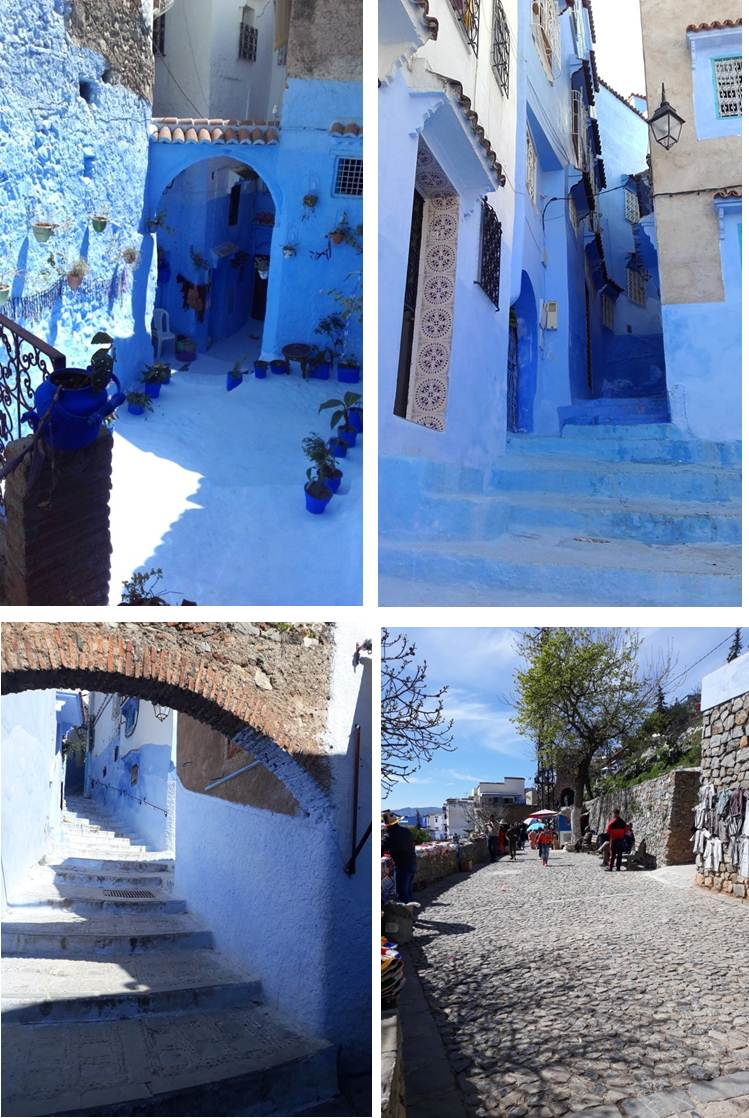
Illustrations of the typical blue facades of Chefchaouen city

Chefchaouen is located in a territory traditionally inhabited by Jebala, subsequently joined by Muslim and Jewish refugees from al-Andalus and Spain. The city has maintained strong relations with the inhabitants of the Jbala Region such as Akhmas, Ghomara, Ghazaoua, and Sanhaja tribes, particularly in terms of trade. The federations of these tribes were sometimes a source of strength, and sometimes a weakness due to their frequent struggles to take possession of assets such as water sources, grazing areas, and fertile land.

The traditional houses of Chefchaouen were made of stone, brick, tile, wood, soil, and lime. Each house had an open yard in the center surrounded by corridors and bedrooms. The yards are often decorated with fruit trees such as oranges, lemons, berries, and grapes, as well as some perfumed shrubs including night-blooming jessamine (Cestrum nocturnum) and jasmine (Jasminum officinale). From a physiognomy perspective, the city is influenced by Andalusian architecture, such as the curved brick archways that strengthen the houses and decorate the narrow blue alleyways, the traditional water network, and the landscaping and care of plants inside houses and mosques. From a cultural perspective, many Chefchaouen families have conserved the art of Andalusian music, which has become the main ritual of Chefchaouen religious festivals and social ceremonies.

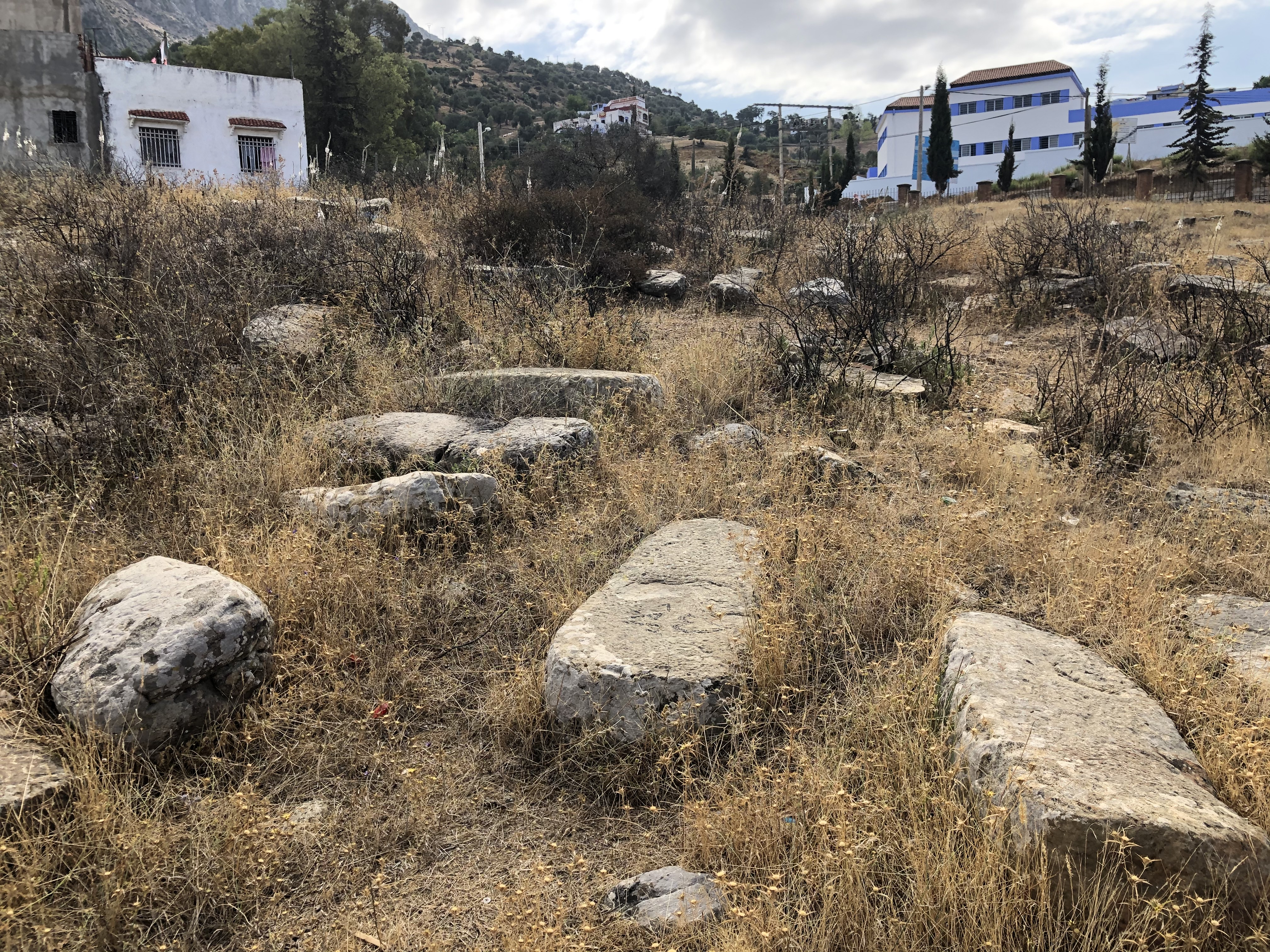
Chefchaouen Jewish Cemetery. The Jews, of Iberian origin and Haketia speakers, were once a third of Chefchaouen's population. The last Jewish family emigrated to Israel in 1968. In addition to the cemetery, there are remains of the Mellah.

The rural landscape was characterized by a distribution of space according to intra- and intertribal relations. At the level of each dshar (low-density rural settlements), the houses are built around a mosque or a marabou and occupy the center of the concentric spatial structure of traditional agro-sylvo-pastoral systems. This spatial distribution of dshars is tightly associated with arable land and availability of water resources, with shifting cultivation limited to a diffuse strip of matorral shrubland and pasture that mark the transition to forests. However, this traditional agro-salvo-pastoral system has been deeply affected by multiple processes of modern socio-cultural and economic transformation.

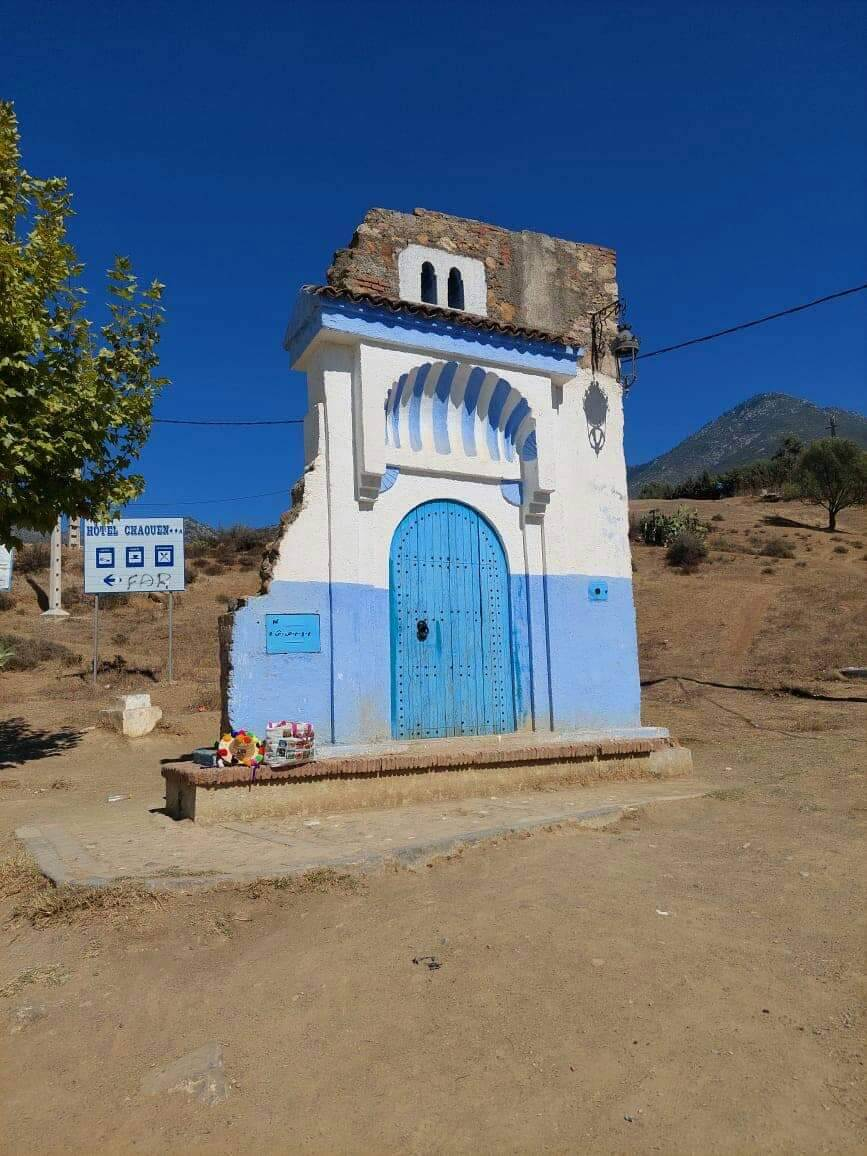
The famous traditional door, a symbol of Chefchaouen city.

=== Traditions ===
Chefchaouen's residents commit to religious and social rituals. The devout perform prayer together in the mosque or the zawiya (a Sufi shrine or religious complex). They also like to visit their families and friends on religious and social occasions. Some of the major religious and social occasions include:

- Sha’banah takes place on the 15th of Shaa’ban (i.e. the 8th month of Hijri calendar). It is commonly known as the Day of Nusskhah, in which the tomb of Moulay Abd Salam Ben Mshish is visited, of particular observance by the students of msids (Quranic schools).
- The night of Al-Qad is observed on the 26th of Ramadan, when the people encourage 7–10-year-old girls to fast. Families usually celebrate at home, but often parade following the afternoon prayer with the girls wearing wedding clothes.
- Ashura is celebrated on the 10th of Muharram (observed by Jewish residents as Yom Kippur). Preparations begin after Eid Al-Adha when part of the Eid meat is dried as qaddid, and on Ashura is eaten with couscous by families, along with dried fruit (almonds, walnuts, raisins, and pistachios), dates and various traditional sweets. Children receive great attention and are often gifted traditional and modern items, including toys.
- Mawlid Nabawi (Muhammad's birthday) is celebrated on the 12th of Rabii’ Al-Awwal. It is designated as Eid and involves the reading of the Quran and Muhammad's biography in mosques or at people’s homes. This night is also celebrated in the mausoleum of Ali Ben Rashid and the 13 zawiyas throughout the city. Couscous is served to the poor and prisoners. During this celebration, mass circumcision of children is carried out following the afternoon prayer, and gifts are distributed to their families.
- Hakouzah Day is celebrated on 1 January of the agricultural solar calendar. It is observed by preparing and eating various traditional foods, in appreciation of the past harvest's bounty and the hope that the New Year will be better.

Despite the diversity of these ceremonies, observances of similar characters are present in almost all of Morocco.

In her annotated study on Storytelling in Chefchaouen Northern Morocco literary scholar Aicha Rahmouni published orally transmitted tales in Chefchaouen's form of colloquial Moroccan Arabic told by two storytellers, accompanied with transliterations and translations.

== Economy ==
In 2020, Chefchaouen was included as a learning city in the UNESCO Global Network of Learning Cities (GNLC). This network encourages policy discussion and mutual learning between its members, to forge collaborations and develop abilities and designs tools to support and identify progress.

=== Agricultural sector ===
Agriculture is an important sector of the economy in the Chefchaouen area, which is known for its large agro-pastoral component. A traditional subsistence agriculture is practiced there on the hillsides and in the valleys – olives being the main crop. Other traditional crops such as grape vines, almonds and figs are still cultivated, although cannabis monoculture has become more profitable than these with an increased influx of tourists in recent decades.

=== Industry and commerce ===
The industrial sector of Chefchaouen province remains very weak despite the province's potential with its availability of human and natural resources. The commercial sector is one of the main economic supports of Chefchaouen, bolstered by tourism activity and remittances from workers abroad. It is mainly focused on urban centers and the main rural communes and is based on the sale of traditional food products, construction materials, clothing, and household items. Commercial transactions become dynamic during summer, with the influx of tourists and the return of foreign workers to the province. The Rif region around Chefchaouen is also a center of cannabis production in Morocco.

=== Tourism ===
During the holidays, the city sees a considerable influx of Moroccan and foreign tourists, attracted by its natural landscapes and historical monuments. Tourism is largely seasonal, with 200 hotels in the province catering to an influx of European tourists in the summer. In 2018, the annual number of tourists visiting the city was estimated at 120,000. In the past, some of the city's tourism was also linked to the availability of good-quality, low-cost cannabis produced in the region. Tourism has since increased primarily due to the Medina's appeal. Authorities have also promoted the region's natural environment. A nearby attraction is the Kef Toghobeit Cave, one of the deepest caves in Africa.

=== Handicraft sector ===
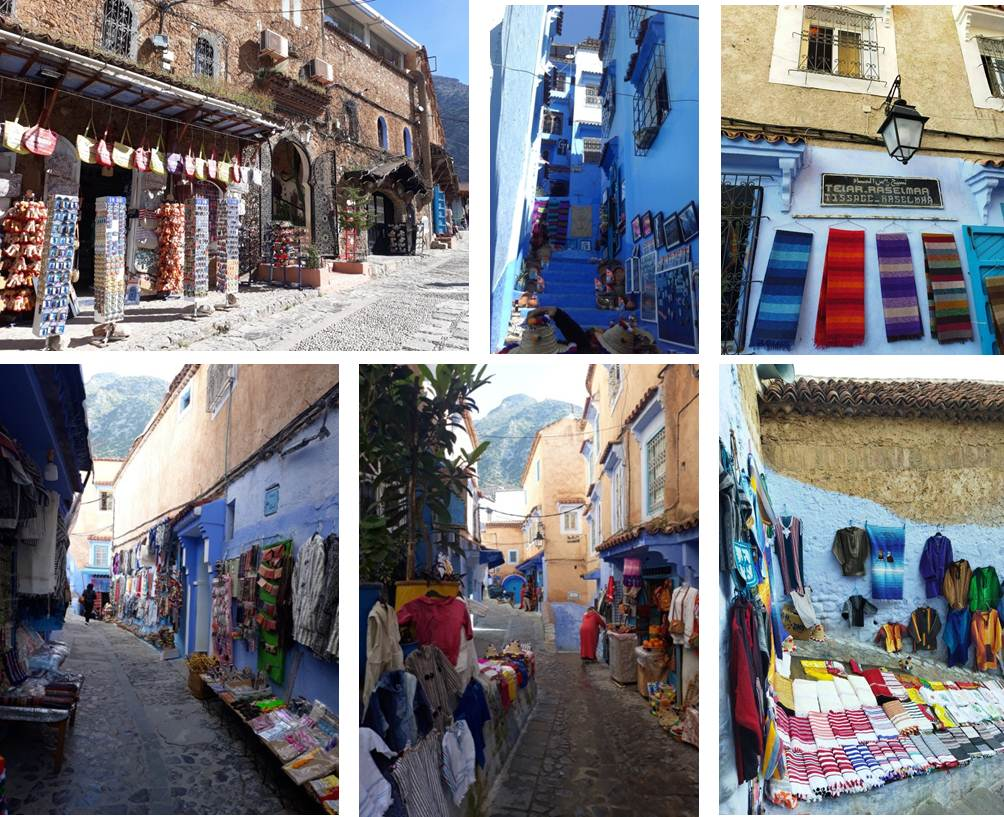
Illustrations of some artisanal products sold in the Medina (old town)

The handicraft sector or traditional industry (e.g., sewing, cupping, blacksmithing, carpentry, needlework, and tanning) is the most common economic activity practiced by Chefchaouen's population and thus plays key a socio-economic role in this province. It is closely related to the tourism sector and includes a multitude of artisans (38 cooperatives and 688 artisan adherents in 2016) largely occupied in leather, textile, ironwork, and traditional carpentry. Wood products represent the best-selling artisanal product in Chefchaouen province, with 57.6% of products sold.

== Landmarks ==
Chefchaouen's blue walls are a popular subject of interest. There are several theories as to why the walls were painted blue. One popular theory is that the blue keeps mosquitos away. The blue is said to symbolize the sky and heaven and serve as a reminder to lead a spiritual life. However, according to some locals, the walls were mandated to be painted blue in the 1970s to attract tourists.

=== Medina ===
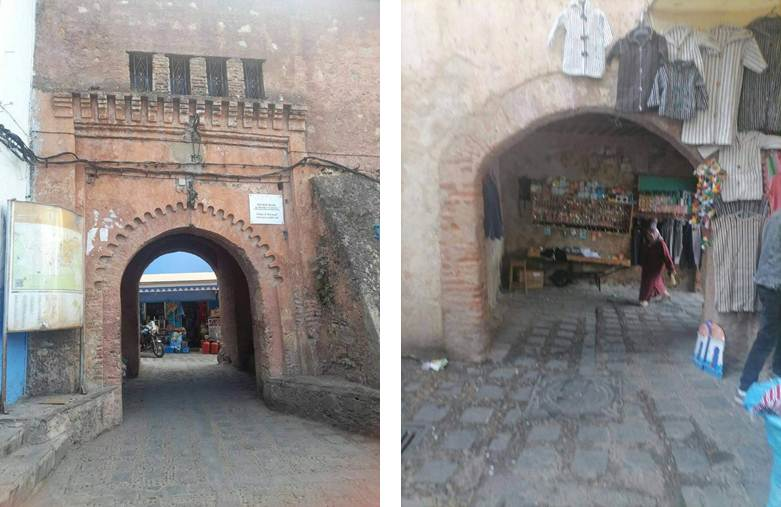
Some of the historic gates of the Medina: Bab Souk (left) and Bab al-Ain (right)

The Medina is the historical district of Chefchaouen, where blue and white paint dominates the walls and houses. The Medina was enclosed by defensive walls and some of its historic gates are still preserved.

Uta Hammam Square (Place Outa Hammam), the main square at the heart of the Medina

The heart of the Medina is Uta Hammam Square (or Place Outa Hammam), a market square surrounded by the most important buildings of the old town – the Kasbah, the Great Mosque, and a caravanserai – as well as various shops and cafés. The square was probably created by Moulay Muhammad (one of Ali ibn Rashid's sons) in the 16th century. It takes its name from a hammam (public bathhouse) in the northwest corner.

The funduq (caravanserai), near the northwest corner of the square, is the largest of the four caravanserais in the city, built to house merchants and travelers. The building consists of a courtyard surrounded by a multi-story gallery and rooms. Its architecture is simple, distinguished only by its tall entrance portal with a large pointed horseshoe arch.

To the southwest of the Kasbah is the Souika neighbourhood, one of the oldest in the city, established since the 15th century. Its name, meaning "Little Souk", derives from the presence of a market (qaysariyya) created here in its earliest days. This market area was originally marked off from the surrounding district and enclosed by its own gates, of which one archway remains.

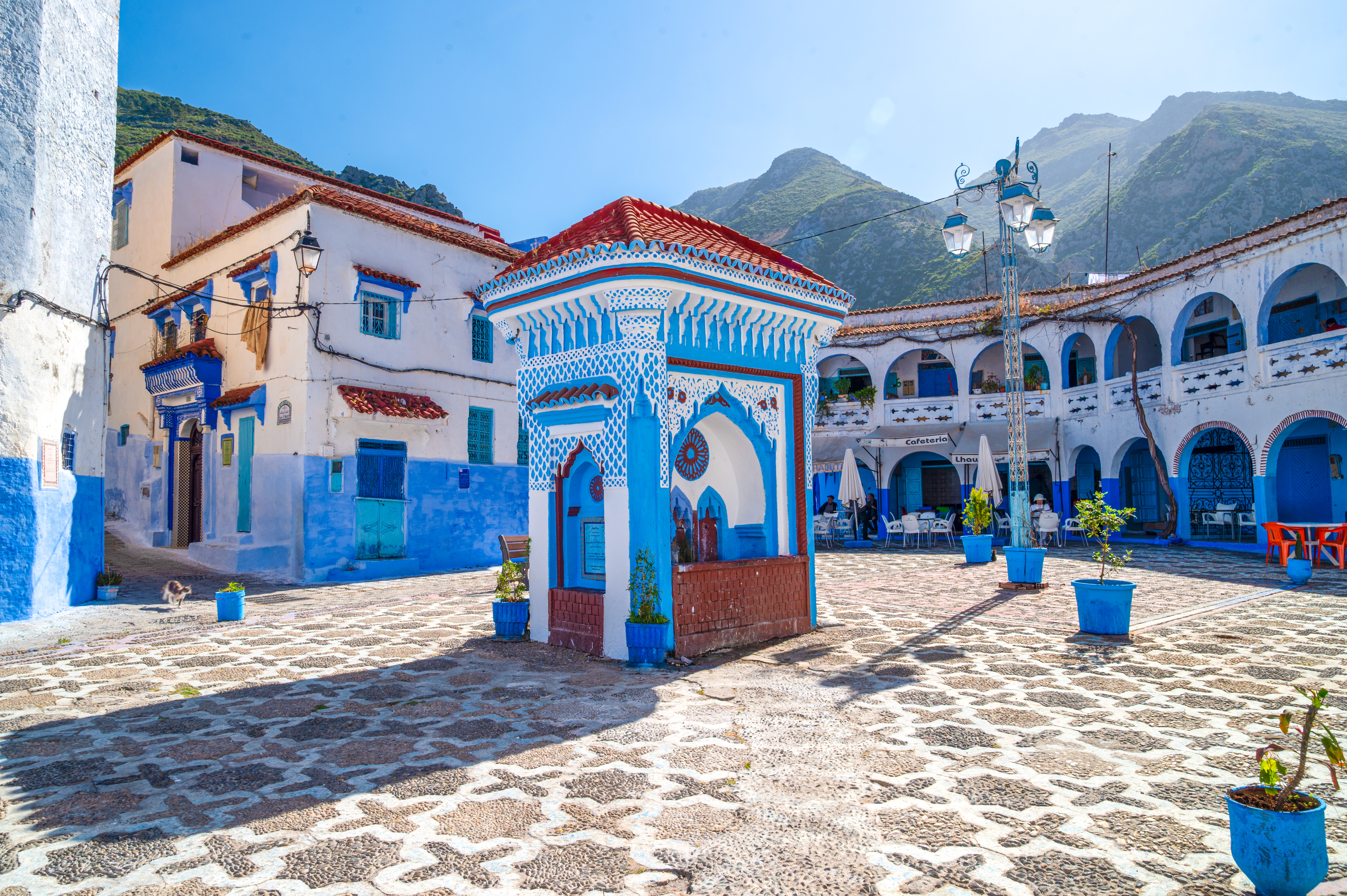
Example of a fountain in one of the small public squares of the Medina

A number of traditional fountains are located throughout the old city and provided water for its inhabitants. One example is the four-sided fountain at the center of the Uta Hammam Square. Its four façades are each decorated with a blind arch niche and the structure was originally topped by a dome. It has since been redecorated and repainted, with the dome replaced by a green-tiled roof. Another example is the Aïn Souika Fountain in the Souika neighborhood, an old wall fountain set behind an archway. The façade of the fountain is decorated with a blind arch framed by concentric multifoil decoration, topped by small blind windows above. A recent restoration most likely added the current tile decoration that imitates zellij.

=== Kasbah ===
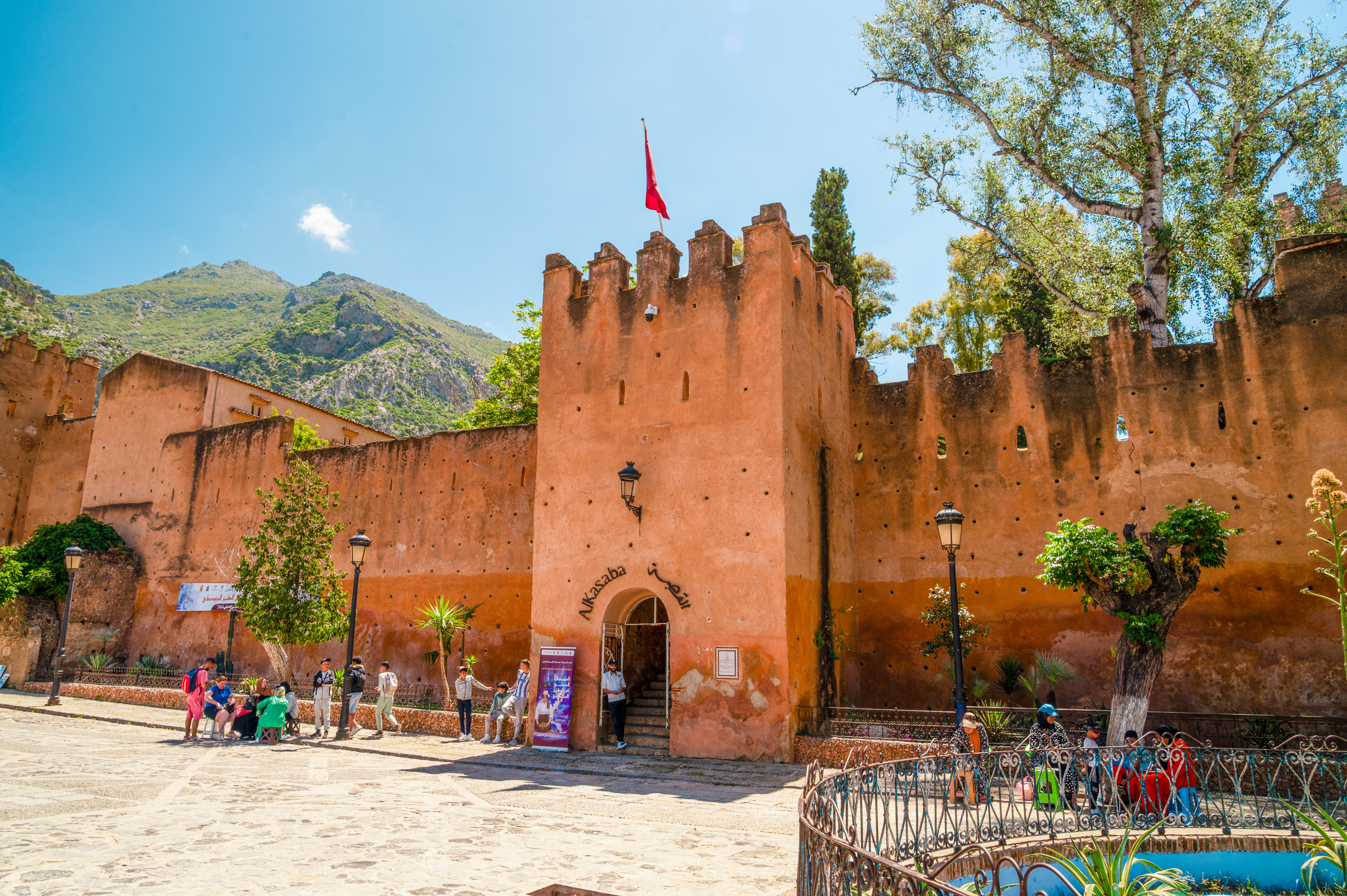
The walls and modern entrance of the Kasbah

The oldest part of the Medina is the Kasbah, the original citadel founded in the late 15th century by Ali ibn Rashid. The fortress consists of a roughly rectangular enclosure protected by walls built in rammed earth (pisé). The Kasbah originally had two entrances: one facing the main square and markets, another near the Great Mosque. These entrances have since been closed or repurposed and modern access is through an opening created in the 1930s.

The Kasbah's walls are reinforced by ten towers, also built in rammed earth, and an additional tower on the west side, built in rubble masonry reinforced with cut stone at the corners. The latter tower, which is taller and stands out from the rest, was probably built in the early 16th century by Moulay Muhammad. It has multiple rooms inside, some covered by brick domes. Its structure and function appears similar to some of the tower-residences of Nasrid architecture in Granada. Some old cisterns have been discovered on site, likely dating to the Kasbah's original construction and its early use as a residence.

Today, the Kasbah has been converted into a museum and its interior courtyard is occupied by a garden. The museum's exhibitions are focused on archeological objects and ethnography and they are located on the ground floor of a historic house in the northeast corner of the enclosure. The house was likely built in the late 17th century during the reign of Moulay Ismail, probably by Ali Errifi, the local governor.

=== Religious sites ===
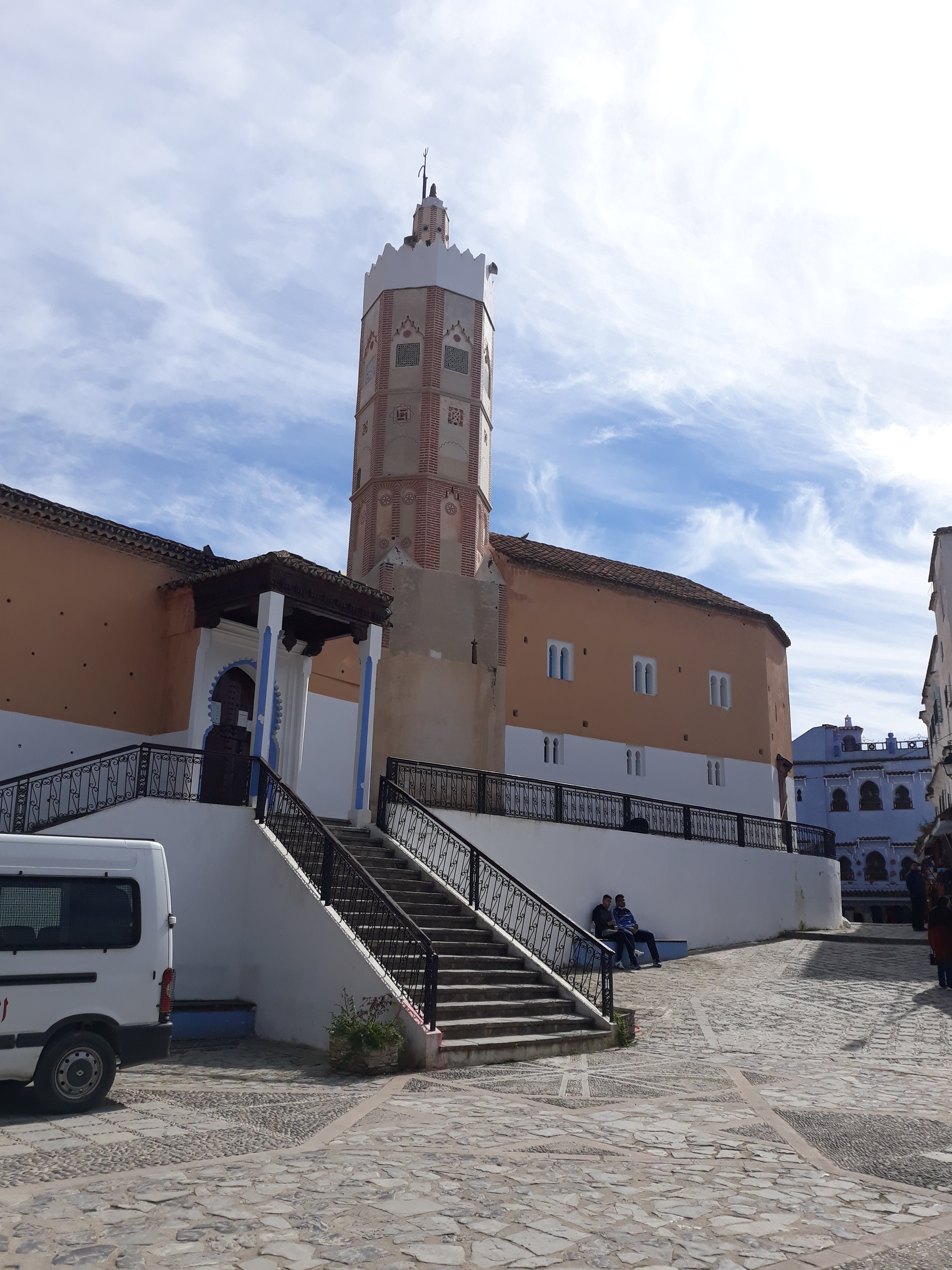
The Great Mosque with its octagonal minaret

The Great Mosque of Chefchaouen is the city's oldest and historically most important mosque, located at Place Outae Hammam at the heart of the Medina, close to the Kasbah. The Spanish Mosque is a disused mosque overlooking the town from a hill to the east. It was built by the Spanish in the 1920s and is now a popular lookout point.

Outside the city, the Mausoleum of Abdessalam Ben Mshish al-Alami is dedicated to the patron saint of northern Morocco's Jebalah region, Moulay Abdessalam Ben Mshish al-Alami. His tomb and the village surrounding it are roughly 50 kilometres (31 mi) northwest of Chefchaouen on the old road to Larache.

=== Ras al-Ma' ===
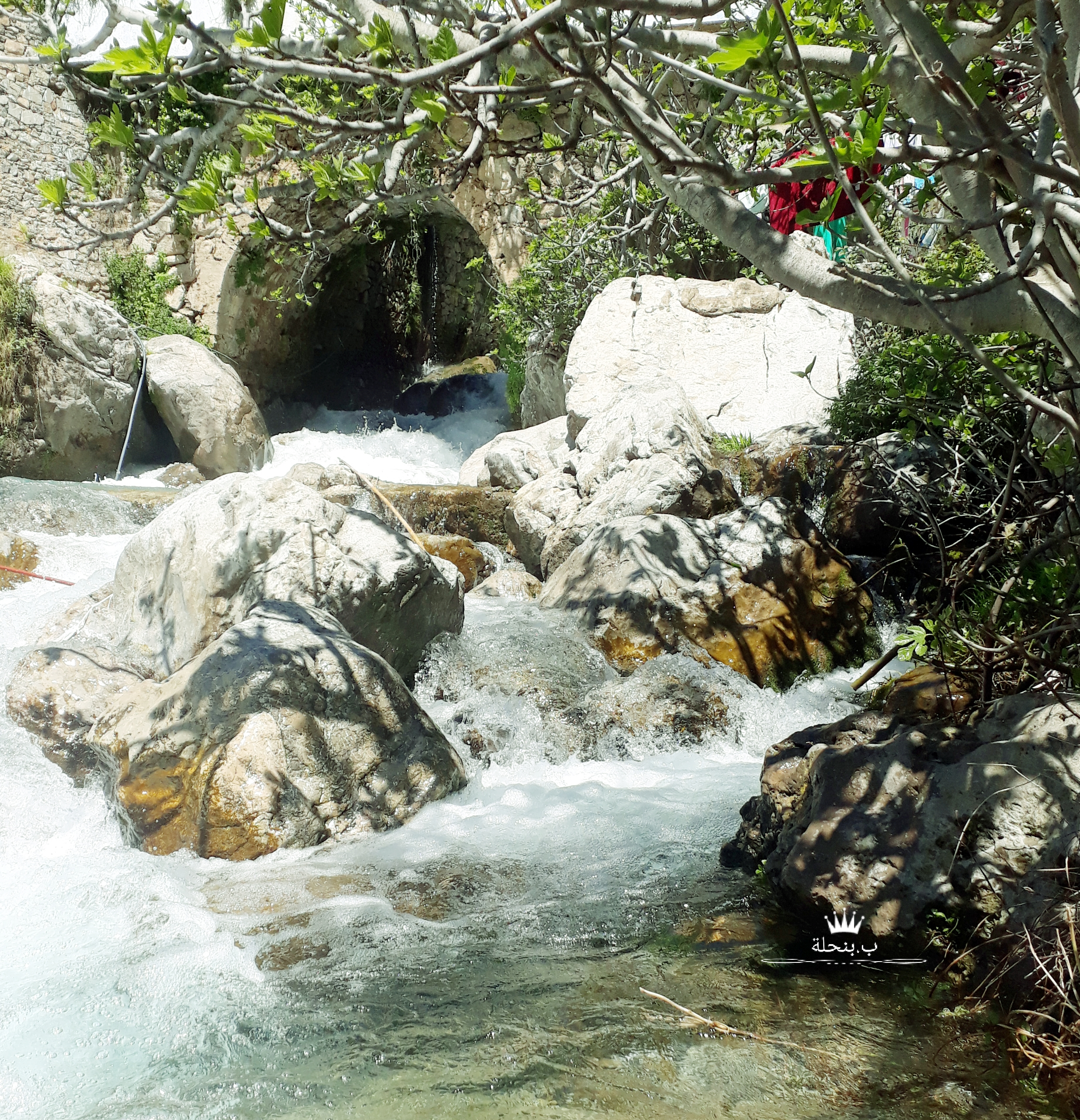
Ras al-Ma', the city's traditional water source

This water source is located just east of the Medina, outside its former walls. It was the original source of water for the city. The spot where the water emerges at the surface was once open but is now enclosed by a stone structure. Nearby and downstream are located an old mill, and a bridge, possibly from the 19th century, which links the two shores of the stream.

== International relations ==
A list of twin towns and sister cities includes:

- Issaquah, Washington, United States (since April 11, 2007)
- Vejer de la Frontera, Spain
- Ronda, Spain
- Kunming, China
- Testour, Tunisia
- Mértola, Portugal
- Beni Mellal, Morocco (domestic)

== Notable people ==
- Ahmed Hammoudan, professional footballer
- Abdelkarim Tabbal, poet
- Sayyida al Hurra, corsair, queen, and governor

== Sources ==
- Dipasquale, Letizia (2020-12-14). Understanding Chefchaouen: Traditional knowledge for a sustainable habitat. Firenze University Press. ISBN 978-88-5518-177-8.
