= Abdul Karim (Ghanaian footballer) =

Ghanaian professional footballer

Abdul Karim (born 1 March 2000) is a Ghanaian professional footballer who plays as midfielder for Ghanaian Premier League side Bechem United.

== Career ==
Karim started his career with Bechem United and he made his debut during the 2019–20 season. He made his debut in a 2–1 victory over Berekum Chelsea on 2 February 2020. On 20 February 2020, he scored his debut goal after scoring the first goal in the 2–1 victory over Liberty Professionals. He played in 6 league matches and scored 1 goal before the league was cancelled due to restrictions from the COVID-19 pandemic in Ghana.

He was named on the squad for the 2020–21 season and had his breakout season during that season.
