= Ali ibn Rashid al-Alami =

15th-century Moroccan vizier

Abu al-Hassan Ali ibn Moussa ibn Rashid al-Alami (Arabic: أبو الحسن علي بن موسى بن راشد العلمي, romanized: Abū al-Ḥasan ‘Ali ibn Mūsā ibn Rāshid al-‘Alamī), also known as Sherif Moulay Ali Ben Rachid, was the founder of the city of Chefchaouen, Morocco. He was an Idrisid and descendant of Sufi saint Abd as-Salam ibn Mashish al-Alami. He was also the father of Sayyida al-Hurra, governor of Tetouan.

He founded the city of Chefchaouen in 1471 as a base from which to attack the Portuguese who had conquered Ceuta in 1415.
