= Majdouline Idrissi =

Moroccan actress

- Born: October 24, 1979 (age 47); Rabat, Morocco
- Occupations: Actress, comedian
- Years active: 2002-present

Majdouline Idrissi (Arabic: ماجدولين الإدريسي; born October 24, 1979) is a Moroccan actress and comedian. She participated in several Moroccan films and series

== Biography ==
Idrissi was born in Rabat in 1979. Her parents are of Berber ancestry. Idrissi dreamed of becoming a ballerina, enrolling in ballet lessons at the age of four. At age 16, she moved to Montreal to study business management, and discovered her passion for cinema after she went with a friend to a theater competition. In 2003, she made her film debut in El Bandia, which was popular among younger audiences. She starred as Habiba in the 2006 film La Symphonie marocaine, directed by Kamal Kamal. Idrissi played Jamila in Souad Hamidou's 2009 film Camille and Jamila. She portrayed Rihanna, a sick girl at a mental asylum, in Pégase in 2010, and received her first prize for her performance. In 2016, Idrissi played Myriam, one of the leading female roles, in Divines, directed by Houda Benyamina. The film won the Caméra d'Or at the Cannes Film Festival. Idrissi has also acted in theatrical productions and has been praised for her versatility as an actress.

In a 2019 interview, she stated that she cannot wear a bathing suit to the beach for fear of public harassment from photographers due to her fame.

== Acting credits ==
=== Film ===
key
†	Denotes films that have not yet been released

year	title	role	Director	notes
2002	Oueld El Derb		Said Naciri	
2003	The Bandits		Said Naciri	
2006	The moroccan Symphony	Habiba	Kamal Kamal	Moroccan submission for the 79th Academy Awards.
2006	It snows in Marrakesh		Hicham Alhayate	Short film
2007	Nancy and The Monster	Nancy	Mahmoud Frites	
2008	Ex-Shamkar		Mahmoud Frites	
2009	The Man who sold the world		Imad Noury; Swel Noury	Official Selection at 2010 Berlin Film Festival
2009	Camille and Jamila	Jamila	Souad Amidou	Short film
2010	Pegase	Rihanna	Mohamed Mouftakir	She won Best actress in a leading role award at the 2010 National film festival in Tangier.
2011	The road to paradise	Leila	Houda Benyamina	Short film
2013	Pillow Secrets		Jillali Ferhati	
2013	Youm ou Lila (A Day and a Night)		Naoufel Berraoui	
2014	The Narrow Frame of the Midnight	Nadia	Tala Hadid	
2015	The Blind Orchestra	Fatima	Mohamed Mouftakir	The film Won the Tanit d'Or at 2015 Carthage Film Festival.
2015	Aida		Driss Mrini	Moroccan submission for the 88th Academy awards.
2016	Divines	Myriam	Houda Benyamina	The film won the Caméra d'Or at 2016 Cannes Film Festival The film was nominated for Best Foreign Language Film at the 74th Golden Globe Awards.
2017	Au pays des merveilles	Leila	Jihane Bahar	English Title : "In Wonderland"
2017	Lahnech (The Snake)	Bouchra	Driss Mrini	
2023	Dados		Abdelouahed Mjahed	
2023	Triple A		Jihane Bahar	She has won Best Actress in a Supporting Role At National Film Festival in Tangier.
2023	Ana Mashi Ana	Cheikha La Mama	Hicham El Jebbari	
2024	L'Batal (Eng : The Hero)		Omar Lotfi	
2024	Operation: Raqqa		Gerardo Herrero	
2025	Routini	Nora	Lotfi Aït Jaoui	
2025	The Ants		Yassine Fennane	
2025	The Imposters		Hicham El Jebbari	
TBA	Les uns contre les autres †		Mehdi Meklat; Badroudine Said Abdallah	Post-production

=== Television ===
Year	title	role	notes
2005	A Very Respectable Family		Sitcom : 30 episodes
2005	The Labyrinth	Siham	Television film
2006	Le Petit Bonheur	Samira	Television film
2006	The Right Path	Nawal	Television film
2007	Amal's Father	Amal	Television film
2010	Yak Hna Jirane		Sitcom
2011	The Five Seasons	Hind	Television film
2016	L'Auberge		Sitcom : 30 episodes
2016	Hyati (My Life)	Amina	Drama series : 30 episodes
2016	Hna Tah Rial		Television film
2017	The orphelin		Miniseries : 15 episodes
2017	Addasser (The arrogant)	Leila	Television film
2019-2020	Daba tazyan		Comedy series : 45 episodes
2021	Wlad El-Marssa		Drama series : 30 episodes
2021	Sortek Bin Ainya		Drama series : 24 episodes
2021-2023	Wlad El A'am (The cousins)		Drama series : 60 episodes
2022	Nisf Kamar (Demi-lune)		Drama series : 30 episodes
TBA	Mahboubi : Love Story †		Anthology miniseries : 1 episode
