= Al Qadisiyya =

1981 film

- Directed by: Salah Abu Seif
- Written by: Mahfouz Abdel Rahman; Ali Ahmad Bakathir; Salah Abu Seif
- Starring: Soad Hosny; Ezzat El Alaili; Laila Taher; Shaza Salem; Hassan Al-Jundi
- Music by: Walid Gholmieh
- Release date: 13 July 1981
- Running time: 145 minutes
- Countries: Egypt; Iraq
- Language: Arabic
- Box office: $15,000,000

Al Qadisiyya is a 1981 drama film directed and co-written by Salah Abu Seif and stars Soad Hosny. It was entered into the 12th Moscow International Film Festival. The historical film was produced in tandem with Egypt and with Iraq’s Cinema and Theatre Department.

== Plot ==
The film portrays the Battle of al-Qadisiyyah, in which the Islamic army of Sa'd ibn Abi Waqqas (after the death beforehand of Al-Muthanna ibn Haritha) definitively ended the Sassanid Empire by defeating the Persian forces of Rostam Farrokhzad.

== Cast ==
- Soad Hosny as Chirine
- Ezzat El Alaili as Saad Ibn Abi Waqas
- Laila Taher as Bouran
- Shetha Salim as Salma bint Hafsa
- Hassan Al Joundi as Rostam
- Hala Shawkat as Azar Midukht
- Mohamed Almansour as Abu Mahjan
- Omar Khalfah as Ibn Amr
- Sa'dia Zeidi as Al Khansaa
- Taema Al Tamimi as Al Maany

== Production ==
The cost of production was estimated at 4 million Iraqi dinars, at the time equivalent to 15 million dollars. It was the most expensive Arab film production in history at the time.
