= Imad Noury =

Spanish-Moroccan filmmaker

Imad Noury (born 1983) is a Spanish-Moroccan filmmaker.

== Biography ==
Noury was born on January 6, 1983, in Casablanca. He is the son of renowned Moroccan filmmaker Hakim Noury, and Maria Pilar Cazorla, a Spanish producer. He has worked as an assistant on many of his father's films, and has co-directed all of his films with his older brother Swel Noury.

== Filmography ==
=== Short films ===
- 1999: Coupable (Guilty)
- 2001: Pas de secrets (No secrets)
- 2003: Album de famille (Family album)

=== Feature films ===
- 2006: Heaven's Doors (Les portes du paradis)
- 2009: The Man Who Sold The World
- 2012: Elle est diabétique 3
