= Erwan Kepoa Falé =

French actor (born 1991 or 1992)

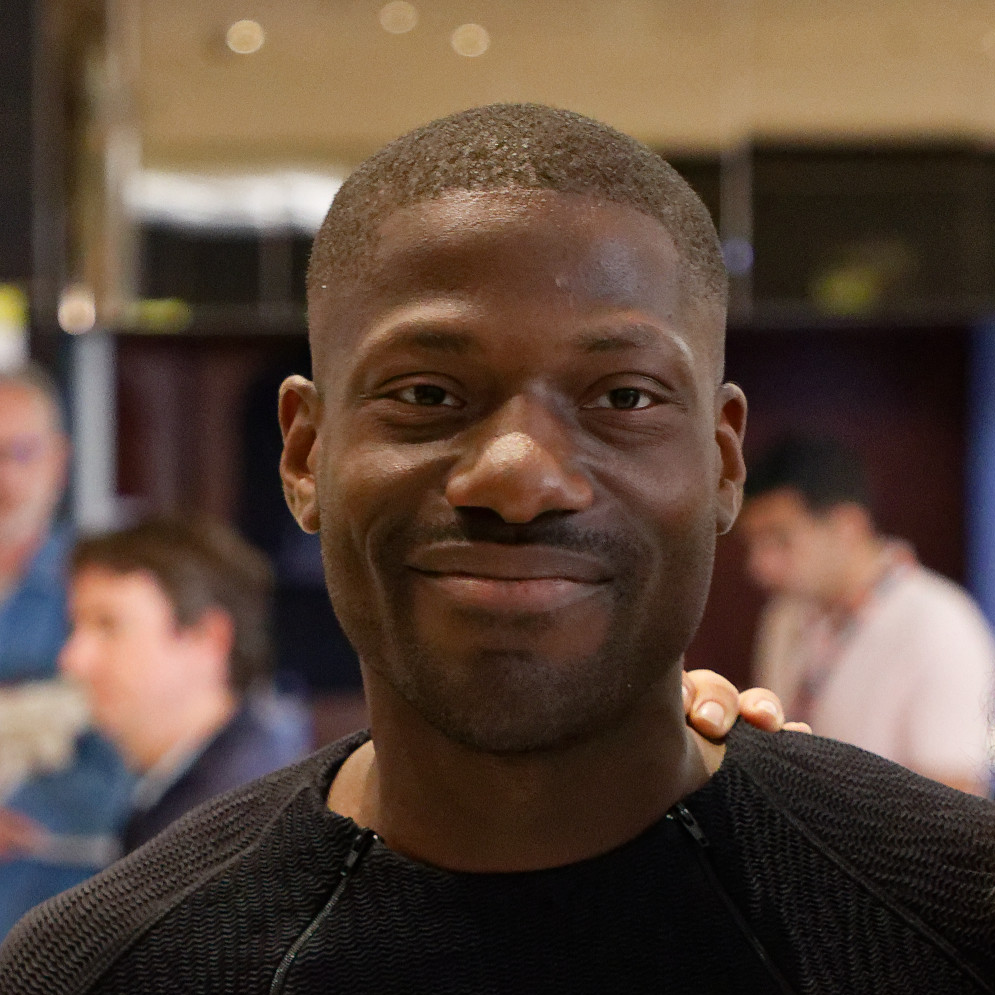
- Falé in May 2024
- Born: 1991 or 1992 (age 33–34); Cergy, France
- Occupation: Actor
- Years active: 2019–present

Erwan Kepoa Falé (French: [ɛʁvan kepoa fale]; born 1991 or 1992) is a French actor.

== Career ==
Falé was born in Cergy, an arrondissement of Pontoise, the son of Ivorian emigrants. He grew up there and pursued an acting career after graduating from the lycée, working in other fields while studying. He worked as a barman and decorator and ventured into the fashion industry, serving as a press officer for fashion brands.

At the age of 25, Falé had his first introduction to professional acting when one of his friends invited him to take part in a short film about a group of friends living in the Paris suburbs. In 2020, he acted in another short film before making his breakthrough role in the 2022 drama film Winter Boy, written by Christophe Honoré. There, he worked alongside Paul Kircher, Vincent Lacoste, and Juliette Binoche, playing the role of Lacoste's character's best friend and roommate.

After Winter Boy in 2022, Falé had two other roles in major French productions: Passages (2023) by Ira Sachs and the 2024 thriller film Eat the Night by Caroline Poggi and Jonathan Vinel. Other later roles include the short film Taxi Moto (2026) by Gaël Kamilindi and the drama film Adieu Monde Cruel by Félix de Givry.

== Personal life ==
Falé identifies as gay and queer. He said that growing up as a Black man in the Paris suburbs was hard for him, stating that in the 2000s it was not easy to be gay among his group of friends. Falé also said that he did not find Black and gay friends until the age of 25, adding his belief that activism against racism goes hand in hand with the promotion of LGBTQ rights.

In an interview in June 2023 with Mixte Magazine, Falé said that he was at peace with his homosexuality and his career, stating that he became aware "very early on" about it. He considered Honoré's film Winter Boy to be a "beautiful film", saying that the sex scenes between teenagers featured in the movie would have helped him in his own adolescence while struggling with the acceptance of his own sexuality. Falé added that he was offered the role six months after his father's death and that, like in the film's main character's story, he took refuge in having sex to escape grief.

== Works ==
=== Selected filmography ===
Year	Title	Role	Notes	Ref
2019	Akaboum		Short film	
2020	Dustin	Erwan Fale	Short film	
2022	Winter Boy	Lilio Rossio		
2023	Passages	Amad		
2024	Eat the Night	Night		
2025	Adieu monde cruel			
2026	Taxi Moto		Short film	
2026	Chica Checa	Remi		

== Awards and nominations ==
Award	Date of ceremony	Category	Work	Result	Ref.
50th César Awards	28 February 2025	César Award for Best Male Revelation	Eat the Night	Nominated	
