= Youm ou Lila =

- Directed by: Naoufel Berraoui
- Written by: Naoufel Berraoui
- Produced by: Rachida Saadi
- Starring: Touria Alaoui, Majdouline Idrissi, Omar Lotfi
- Cinematography: Fadil Chouika
- Edited by: Njoud Jeddad
- Music by: Simou Mohamed
- Production company: KAMA 4 PROD
- Release date: 16 October 2013
- Running time: 95 minutes
- Country: Morocco
- Language: Moroccan Arabic

Youm ou Lila (English: A Day and a Night, French: Une journée et une nuit) is a comedy-drama film directed by Naoufel Berraoui and released in October 2013.

== Synopsis ==
The film tells the story of Izza, a mother from the Souss countryside, and the difficulties she faces in caring for her seriously ill daughter. Every month, her husband Hussein sends a parcel to his family containing medicine for his daughter. When he once forgets to do so, endangering the life of his child, Izza - who has never left her native countryside - decides to make a long journey to Casablanca in search of her husband. She meets Aziza, a prostitute who will help her. The journey will last one day and one night, hence the title of the film.

== Cast ==
- Touria Alaoui
- Majdouline Drissi
- Omar Lotfi
- Machmoum
- Abdelghani Snak
- Youssef Ouzellal
