= Fayza Kamal =

- Born: Fayza Mohammed Kamal; 31 December 1960; Kuwait
- Died: 26 May 2014 (aged 53); Cairo, Egypt
- Other names: The Beauty of TV
- Occupation: Actress
- Years active: 1978 to 2013
- Notable work: Ra'fat El Hagan
- Spouse: Murad Moneer
- Children: 2
- Website: elcinema.com/person/1083919/

Fayza Kamal (31 December 1960 – 26 May 2014) was an Egyptian actress.

== Early life ==
Kamal was born in Kuwait to Egyptian parents who were working there, and she lived in Kuwait for over twenty years. She also joined the Higher Institute of Dramatic Arts at Alexandria, studying set design and acting. Although her parents insisted she join the set design department and refused to allow her to study acting, her professor, the artist Saad Ardesh, managed to convince them. She subsequently apprenticed under him.

== Career ==
Kamal began her artistic career while still in her first year at the institute. She participated in a historical series titled "Al Adl wal Tafah" alongside Madiha Kamel and Abdullah Ghaith. Her artistic journey continued with various roles offered by directors. She worked with director Sami Mohamed Ali in the series "Watah Al Tareeq" and appeared in the film "The Lost Plane." She eventually returned to Egypt to commence her artistic career in the 1980s, which spanned over thirty years until her illness and subsequent passing in 2014.

== Death ==
Kamal experienced a severe health crisis and was admitted to the Intensive Care Unit at Al-Qasr Al-Aini Hospital in Cairo. After undergoing various tests and scans, it was confirmed that she had uterine cancer, contrary to rumours that she had liver cancer. She died on 26 May 2014, at the age of 53.
