= All for One (2024 film) =

- Directed by: Houda Benyamina
- Screenplay by: Houda Benyamina; Juliette Sales; Fabien Suarez
- Story by: Alexandre Dumas
- Based on: "The Three Musketeers" by Alexandre Dumas
- Produced by: Marc-Benoît Créancier
- Starring: Oulaya Amamra; Sabrina Ouazani; Déborah Lukumuena; Daphné Patakia; Georgina Amorós; Kacey Mottet Klein; Némo Schiffman; Martin Karmann; Salomé Villiers; Maryne Cayon; Pierre Philippe; Éric Wagner
- Cinematography: Christos Voudouris
- Edited by: Loïc Lallemand
- Music by: Amin Bouhafa; Emilie Gassin; Ben Violet
- Production companies: Easy Tiger; StudioCanal; Versus Production; France 2 Cinéma; RTBF; VOO / BeTV; Proximus; Spirit Bird
- Distributed by: UGC Distribution; StudioCanal (France); O'Brother Distribution (Belgium)
- Release dates: 11 November 2024 (Arras Film Festival); 22 January 2025 (France); 29 January 2025 (Belgium)
- Running time: 95 minutes
- Countries: France; Belgium
- Languages: French; Spanish
- Budget: €10 million
- Box office: $70,108

All For One (French: Toutes pour une) is a 2024 swashbuckler adventure film directed and written by Houda Benyamina. It is loosely based on Alexandre Dumas' The Three Musketeers, and the films plot follows four women who are tasked with protecting the Queen of France.

The film premiered at the Arras Film Festival on 11 November 2024, and was released in France on 22 January 2025.

== Synopsis ==
Set in France in 1625, four women are tasked with protecting the Queen of France.

== Cast ==
- Oulaya Amamra as Sara
- Sabrina Ouazani as Athos
- Déborah Lukumuena as Portau
- Daphné Patakia as Aramitz
- Georgina Amorós as Anne
- Kacey Mottet Klein as Richelieu
- Némo Schiffman as Louis XIII
- Martin Karmann as Le Marquis
- Salomé Villiers as La Marquise
- Maryne Cayon as Claudia la charbonnière
- Pierre Philippe as Garde du roi morisque
- Eric Wagner as Homme sources chaudes

== Production ==
Filming took place from 28 April to 17 May 2023 at Lac du Salagou, the Gorges de l'Hérault, and Aveyron, the city of La Couvertoirade.

== Release ==
All for One had its world premiere at the Arras Film Festival on 11 November 2024. The film was released in France on 22 January 2025.
