= Déborah Lukumuena =

French actress (born 1994)

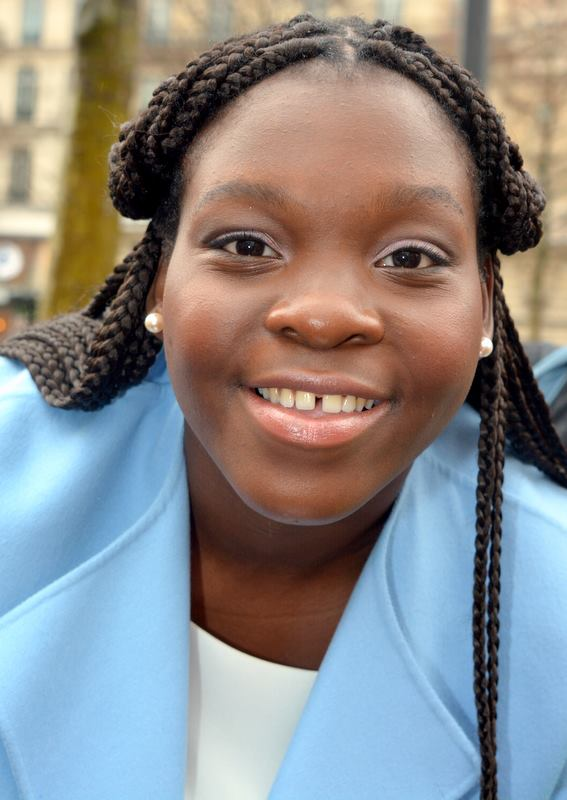
- Lukumuena in 2017
- Born: 4 December 1994 (age 30); Villeneuve-Saint-Georges, Val de Marne, France
- Occupation: Actress
- Years active: 2016–present

Déborah Lukumuena (born 4 December 1994) is a French actress. She is best known for her debut role in the 2016 drama film Divines, for which she won the César Award for Best Supporting Actress.

== Career ==
After her baccalaureate, she obtained a degree in letters. During her studies, she discovered the series The Tudors and the interpretation of Jonathan Rhys-Meyers made her want to become an actress.

She responded to a casting ad, with the idea of getting a job as an extra, but she was selected to play one of the main roles in the film Divines directed by Houda Benyamina. In 2017, Déborah Lukumuena won the César Award for Best Supporting Actress for her role and became the first black woman and the youngest winner in this category.

The following year, she played one of the leads in the comedy-drama Invisibles. The movie follows the activity of a day center for homeless women. It became a surprise hit at the box-office.

In 2022, she directed her first short, called Championne. She also co-wrote the screenplay and had the lead role.

== Personal life ==
She's the fourth child of five siblings and grew up in Épinay-sous-Sénart in a family of Congolese origin.

== Filmography ==
Year	Title	Role	Director	Notes
2016	Divines	Maimouna	Houda Benyamina	Carthage Film Festival - Best Actress; César Award for Best Supporting Actress; Lumière Award for Best Female Revelation
2017	The Tunnel	Manu Illunga	Anders Engström	TV series (1 episode)
2018	Roulez jeunesse	Lou	Julien Guetta	
2019	Invisibles	Angélique	Louis-Julien Petit	
2020	Belle belle belle	Selma	Anne Depétrini	TV movie
2020	Narvalo	Norah	Matthieu Longatte	TV series (1 episode)
2020	Call My Agent!	Djamila Guerroub	Antoine Garceau	TV series (1 episode)
2021	Loving		Thibaut Buccellato	Short
2021	H24	Burger Queen	Charlotte Abramow	TV series (1 episode)
2021	Mental	Max	Slimane-Baptiste Berhoun	TV series (10 episodes)
2022	Robuste	Aïssa	Constance Meyer	
2022	Entre les vagues	Alma Sarnem	Anaïs Volpé	
2022	Championne	Neila	Déborah Lukumuena	Short
2022	Clit Is Good	The girl	Charlotte Abramow	Music video
2023	Girl	Grace	Adura Onashile	
2023	Last Dance	Marjanne	Delphine Lehericey	
2023	Les indociles	Sissi	Delphine Lehericey	TV series (2 episodes)
2024	Muganga	Busara	Marie-Hélène Roux	Post-Production
2024	Toutes pour une	Portau	Houda Benyamina	
2024	Kin La Belle	Élida	Michaux Muanda	Pre-Production

== Theater ==
Year	Title	Author	Director
2019	Odyssey	Homer	Blandine Savetier
2019-21	Anguille sous roche	Ali Zamir	Guillaume Barbot
2021-23	À définir dans un futur proche	Mona Chollet	Élodie Demey, Géraldine Sarratia & Mélissa Phulpin
