= How Are You? (2025 film) =

2025 French animated film

- Festival release poster
- French: Comment ça va?
- Directed by: Caroline Poggi; Jonathan Vinel
- Written by: Caroline Poggi; Jonathan Vinel
- Produced by: Caroline Poggi
- Starring: Ariane Ascaride; Oulaya Amamra; Galatéa Bellugi; Grace Seri
- Cinematography: Pauline Doméjean
- Edited by: Jonathan Vinel
- Animation by: Stanislas Bécot; Hugo Glavier; Lazare Aïbout-Sibille
- Color process: Color
- Production company: 444 Films
- Distributed by: Oyster Films
- Release date: 15 February 2025 (Berlinale)
- Running time: 31 minutes
- Country: France
- Language: French

How Are You? (French: Comment ça va?) is a 2025 French short animated film directed by Caroline Poggi and Jonathan Vinel duo. The film depicts a group of animals, who live on a wild coastline and try to heal the ills caused by the contemporary world.

It was selected in the Berlinale Shorts section at the 75th Berlin International Film Festival, where it had its World premiere on 15 February and compete for Golden Bear for Best Short Film.

== Voices ==
- Ariane Ascaride (Elephant)
- Oulaya Amamra (Penguin)
- Galatéa Bellugi (Lion)
- Grace Seri (Cow)
- Mouna Soualem (Rabbit)
- Barbara’s Braccini (Monkey)
- Claude-Emmanuelle Gajan-Maull (Wolf)
- Océane Court-Mallaroni (Pig)

== Release ==
How Are You? had its World premiere on 15 February 2025, as part of the 75th Berlin International Film Festival, in the Berlinale Shorts 3.

The film was selected in Imagina section of the 59th Karlovy Vary International Film Festival, where it was screened from 4 July to 11 July 2025.

== Accolades ==
From this year, the Berlinale Shorts CUPRA Filmmaker Award will be presented to a distinctive directorial talent within the festival's short film competition. This new accolade is sponsored by CUPRA and comes with a grant of €20,000.

The film was selected for Berlin Short Film Candidate for the European Film Awards.

Award	Date	Category	Recipient	Result	Ref.
Berlin International Film Festival	23 February 2025	Golden Bear for Best Short Film	How Are You?	Nominated	
Berlin International Film Festival	23 February 2025	Berlinale Shorts CUPRA Filmmaker Award	How Are You?	Nominated	
