= Lahnech =

- Directed by: Driss Mrini
- Written by: Abdelilah Hamdouchi
- Produced by: Driss Mrini
- Starring: Aziz Dades, Majdouline Idrissi, Fadila Benmoussa
- Cinematography: Xavier Castro
- Edited by: Meryeme Chadli
- Music by: Adil Aissa
- Production company: Fann Prod
- Release date: 2017
- Running time: 90 minutes
- Country: Morocco
- Language: Moroccan Arabic

Lahnech (English: The Snake) is a 2017 Moroccan comedy film directed by Driss Mrini. The film was screened at multiple national film festivals and had a successful run at the box office.

== Synopsis ==
Farid (Aziz Dades) is being monitored by the authorities for usurping the identity of a police officer. Little does he know that Officer Bouchra (Majdouline Idrissi), the officer sent out to take him into custody, has fallen in love with him.

== Cast ==
- Aziz Dades
- Majdouline Idrissi
- Fadila Benmoussa
- Mouhcine Malzi
- Abdelghani Sannak
