= Bamou =

- Directed by: Driss Mrini
- Written by: Hassan Al-Jundi
- Starring: Badia Rayana; Hassan Al-Jundi; Mohamed Habachi; Larbi Doghmi
- Cinematography: Mohamed El Kortobi
- Edited by: Lahcen Khabbaz
- Music by: Mustapha Belkhayat
- Production company: Prisma
- Release date: 1983
- Running time: 95 minutes
- Country: Morocco
- Language: Moroccan Arabic

Bamou is a 1983 Moroccan film directed by Driss Mrini.

== Synopsis ==
The film tells the love story of a couple struggling against foreign occupation.

== Cast ==
- Badia Rayana
- Mohamed Hassan Al Joundi
- Mohamed Habachi
- Larbi Doghmi
