= Eat the Night =

2024 film

- Directed by: Caroline Poggi; Jonathan Vinel
- Written by: Caroline Poggi; Jonathan Vinel; Guillaume Bréaud
- Produced by: Juliette Schrameck; Mathieu Verhaeghe; Thomas Verhaeghe; Olivier Père
- Starring: Lila Gueneau; Théo Cholbi; Erwan Kepoa Falé
- Cinematography: Raphaël Vandenbussche
- Edited by: Vincent Tricon
- Music by: ssaliva
- Production companies: Agat Films; Ex Nihilo; Atelier de Production
- Release date: 21 May 2024 (Cannes)
- Running time: 106 minutes
- Country: France
- Language: French

Eat the Night is a 2024 French thriller film, directed by Caroline Poggi and Jonathan Vinel. The film centres on the relationship between Apolline (Lila Gueneau) and Pablo (Théo Cholbi), a brother and sister in Le Havre who are passionate fans of an online video game called Darknoon; when the game developers announce that it will be shutting down at Christmastime, Apolline remains obsessed with the game while Pablo moves on and enters a romantic relationship with Night (Erwan Kepoa Falé), with whom he becomes embroiled in a dangerous conflict between rival drug dealer gangs.

== Distribution ==
The film premiered on 21 May 2024 in the Director's Fortnight program at the 2024 Cannes Film Festival, where it was a nominee for the Queer Palm.

== Critical response ==
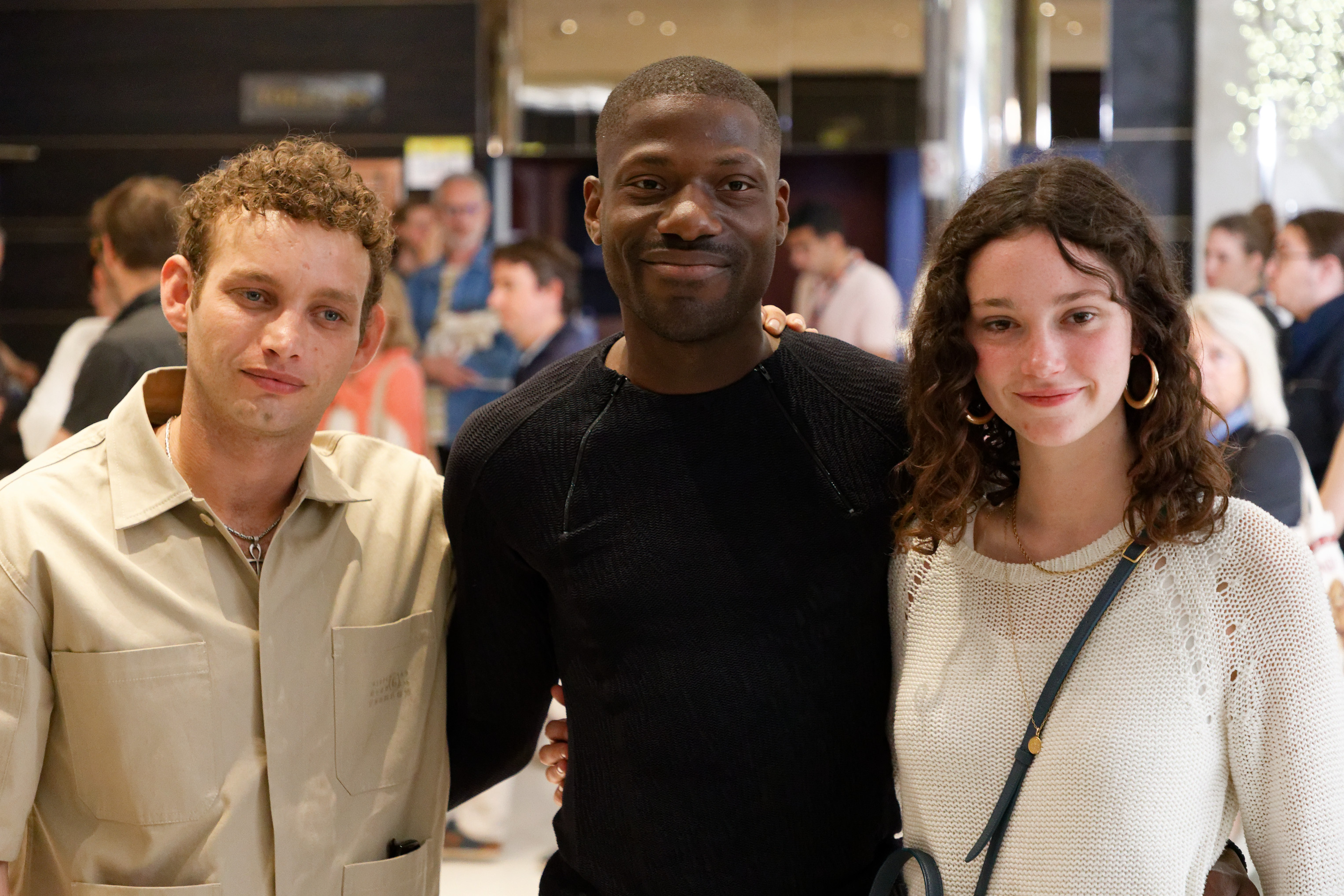
Cholbi, Falé, and Gueneau at the 2024 Cannes Film Festival for the premiere of Eat the Night

Fabien Lemercier of Cineuropa wrote that "Highly physical and intensely paced, Eat The Night moves skillfully between its fascinating virtual universe (notably with a breathtaking apocalyptic finale) and the very nihilistic everyday life in which the protagonists struggle. The filmmakers' conceptual metaphorical subtext comes through loud and clear, and indeed our contemporary world and its young people are in a bad way (threat of climate extinction, brutal communication, escapism in the virtual world and drugs, etc.). However, with the exception of a few sequences, the film doesn't exploit all the narrative possibilities offered by Darknoon, using it brilliantly but repetitively, and above all the dynamic ‘drug war’ part turns out to be very banal and caricatured, not to say implausible. Caroline Poggi and Jonathan Vinel may even have imagined this reality on purpose, as if everything were a vast video game, but from the point of view of the simple spectator, the attempt, despite its high ambition and disparate qualities, is disappointing overall. This will no doubt not prevent the film from finding its audience and its makers from continuing their trajectory as filmmakers with a ‘cult’ label."

Robert Daniels of Screen Daily opined that Pablo was the only fully-developed character in the film, writing that it "frantically switches between Apolline stubbornly sitting home alone and sensual scenes between Pablo and Night. The pair spend their days at their country shack having sex, playing soccer, having sex, dancing, having sex, talking, having sex, holding each other, and having sex, sex, sex. At least this film isn’t afraid to take pleasure in capturing the sexual appetite of the body. These are some of its strongest scenes, conjuring a steaminess under a proto-electronic score that thrums with energy."
