= Touria Alaoui =

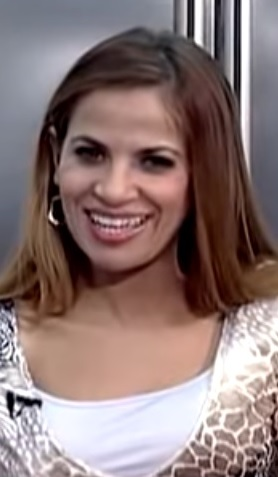
- Touria Alaoui
- Born: September 21, 1970 (age 55); Ouarzazate
- Occupation: Actress
- Spouse: Naoufel Berraoui

Touria Alaoui (born September 21, 1970, in Ouarzazate) is a Moroccan actress. She is married to actor Naoufel Berraoui.

== Partial filmography ==
=== Feature films ===
- L'enfance volée (1993)
- Tarfaya (2004)
- Youm ou Lila (2013)

=== Short films ===
- Liberté provisoire (2007)
- Margelle (2012)
- De l'eau et du sang (2014)
