= The World Is Yours (film) =

2018 film by Romain Gavras

- Theatrical release poster
- French: Le monde est à toi
- Directed by: Romain Gavras
- Screenplay by: Romain Gavras; Karim Boukercha; Noé Debré
- Produced by: Charles-Marie Anthonioz; Mourad Belkeddar; Jean Duhamel; Nicolas Lhermitte; Vincent Mazel; Hugo Sélignac; Paul-Dominique Vacharasinthu
- Starring: Karim Leklou; Isabelle Adjani; Vincent Cassel; Oulaya Amamra; Sam Spruell; Gabby Rose; Sofian Khammes; Mounir Amamra; Mahamadou Sangare; François Damiens; Philippe Katerine
- Cinematography: André Chémétoff
- Edited by: Benjamin Weill
- Music by: Jamie xx; Sebastian
- Production companies: Iconoclast; Chi-Fou-Mi Productions; StudioCanal; NJJ Entertainment; Tribus P Films; 120 Films
- Distributed by: StudioCanal
- Release dates: 12 May 2018 (Cannes); 15 August 2018 (France)
- Running time: 101 minutes
- Country: France
- Language: French
- Box office: $2.7 million

The World Is Yours (French: Le Monde est à toi) is a 2018 French crime comedy film co-written and directed by Romain Gavras. It stars Karim Leklou, Isabelle Adjani, Vincent Cassel, Oulaya Amamra, François Damiens and Philippe Katerine. It was selected to screen at the Directors' Fortnight section of the 2018 Cannes Film Festival.

The leitmotif is Daniel Balavoine's song "La vie ne m'apprend rien".

== Synopsis ==
François, a small-time drug dealer, dreams of starting a new life as the official distributor of Mr. Freeze ice pops in the Maghreb region. However, he discovers that his mother Dany has lost all his savings gambling. An opportunity to acquire the needed capital arises when he is sent on a drug-buying mission to Spain by Poutine, the erratic kingpin of the city. But François's entourage gets involved, which soon disrupts everyone's plans.

== Cast ==
- Karim Leklou as François
- Isabelle Adjani as Dany
- Vincent Cassel as Henri
- Oulaya Amamra as Lamya
- Sam Spruell as Bruce
- Gabby Rose as Britanny
- Sofian Khammes as Poutine
- Mounir Amamra as Mohamed 1
- Mahamadou Sangare as Mohamed 2
- François Damiens as René
- Philippe Katerine as Vincent

== Production ==
The project was announced on 25 April 2017 by Isabelle Adjani in an interview with Grazia magazine. The actress described it as "pretty crazy" and revealed that Vincent Cassel and Oulaya Amamra would also be involved.

== Reception ==
=== Critical response ===
On review aggregation website Rotten Tomatoes, the film holds an approval rating of 95% based on 21 reviews, with an average rating of 7.2/10. On French website Allociné, the film has a critic approval rating of 3.6/5 based on 34 reviews and a viewer approval rating of 3.5/5. Théo Ribeton of French magazine Les Inrockuptibles praised the humour and confidence of director Romain Gavras, comparing the film to Guy Ritchie's early work. In a less enthusiastic review, Corentin Lê of CinéSéries called the plot line "predictable."

Peter Debruge of Variety called the film a "crowd-pleasing Tarantino-esque crime saga." Phil Hoad of The Guardian review wrote that with this film "Gavras has seized his chance, staging this uptempo, carnivalesque crime pic with panache and wit." David Ehrlich of IndieWire called the film "the best movie that Guy Ritchie never made."

=== Award nominations ===
- César Awards:
  - Best Supporting Actress for Isabelle Adjani
  - Most Promising Actor for Karim Leklou
