= Divines (film) =

French drama film

- Theatrical release poster
- Directed by: Houda Benyamina
- Written by: Romain Compingt; Houda Benyamina; Malik Rumeau
- Produced by: Marc-Benoît Créancier
- Starring: Oulaya Amamra; Déborah Lukumuena
- Cinematography: Julien Poupard
- Edited by: Loïc Lallemand; Vincent Tricon
- Music by: Demusmaker
- Production companies: Easy Tiger; France 2 Cinéma
- Distributed by: Diaphana Films
- Release dates: 19 May 2016 (Cannes); 31 August 2016 (France)
- Running time: 105 minutes
- Countries: France; Qatar
- Language: French
- Budget: $2.6 million
- Box office: $2.3 million

Divines is a 2016 crime drama film directed by Houda Benyamina. It was screened in the Directors' Fortnight section at the 2016 Cannes Film Festival. At Cannes, Houda Benyamina won the Caméra d'Or. The film also was an official selection of the Toronto International Film Festival in the Discovery section. It was released on Netflix worldwide (except in France) on 18 November 2016.

== Plot ==
Dounia is a teenage girl living in a Romani banlieue on the outskirts of Paris with her mother and aunt. She and her best friend Maimouna hustle for money, shoplifting from supermarkets and then reselling their wares on the streets to their classmates. The two girls have a secret hiding place in the catwalk of a local theatre where they observe dance auditions. Djigui, an untrained dancer, catches Dounia's eye. One day, Maimouna dares Dounia to spit on him and she does, resulting in him trying to chase her down. He ends up slipping and Dounia rescues him by pulling him up from the catwalk.

At school, Dounia is expected to be trained as a receptionist. She rebels against her teacher, ridiculing her for her lack of money and vowing to earn more money than her teacher could ever dream of. Rebecca, a local drug dealer, shows the kids a video from a trip to Thailand and plans to move there for the growing sex tourism. Determined to be part of Rebecca's gang, Dounia observes her giving drugs to a dealer, Samir. She steals the drugs from a hiding spot and brings them to Rebecca, telling her that she would do a better job as a dealer. Impressed, Rebecca agrees to let Dounia start working for her.

Rebecca gives Dounia and Maimouna a series of odd jobs which they successfully complete, working up the ranks from chores to dealing drugs. Rebecca confides in the two that a rich man, Reda, keeps 100,000 euros in his apartment, and plans for Dounia to steal it. Dounia continues to hide her money in the theatre but when it is gone she confronts Djigui, who refuses to give it back.

Samir drives Dounia and Maimouna go to a nightclub and succeed in getting the mark to notice Dounia. When they leave, they find that Samir has left; when she gets home, Dounia finds Samir having sex with her mother. She scolds her mother, then burns Samir's mother's car. When the firefighters show up Dounia throws glass bottles at them and starts a riot, leading her to be arrested. At the station, Maimouna and Dounia are loudly berated by Maimouna's devout Muslim parents and an angry Rebecca scolds Dounia for getting in trouble with the police.

Dounia goes to Djigui to get her money back in order to gain back Rebecca's favor. Djigui tells her he has been hired as the principal dancer in the show and gives her tickets to watch him perform, along with the money. Instead of going to see him, Dounia goes with Reda to a club. He takes her to his apartment and when he leaves to take a shower Dounia begins searching for his secret cache of money. She is discovered by Reda, who savagely beats her before attempting to rape her. Dounia fights back, knocking out Reda and then manages to locate the money. She leaves some of the money with her mother and hides some for Maimouna, intending to leave on a dance tour with Djigui.

Before she can go she receives a message from Rebecca who is holding Maimouna hostage until Dounia returns. Dounia brings the money to Rebecca, but she notices that some of it is missing and douses Dounia with gasoline, threatening to burn her. Before she can Samir realizes that the money is at her mother's home and leaves to go get it. Enraged, Dounia attacks Rebecca before she throws a lighter and the room they are in catches fire with them locked inside. Maimouna is able to open a vent but is unable to go through. Rebecca escapes and Maimouna urges Dounia to leave as her face is covered in gasoline. The money they were fighting over burns behind them. The firemen arrive in time, but wait outside as they are not allowed to fight fires in the neighbourhood anymore without the presence of riot police. Dounia begs them to save her friend, but they are unmoved, and the building explodes, killing Maimouna. As the police arrive and a riot unfolds, a distraught Dounia is approached by Maimouna's father, who asks her about his daughter.

== Cast ==
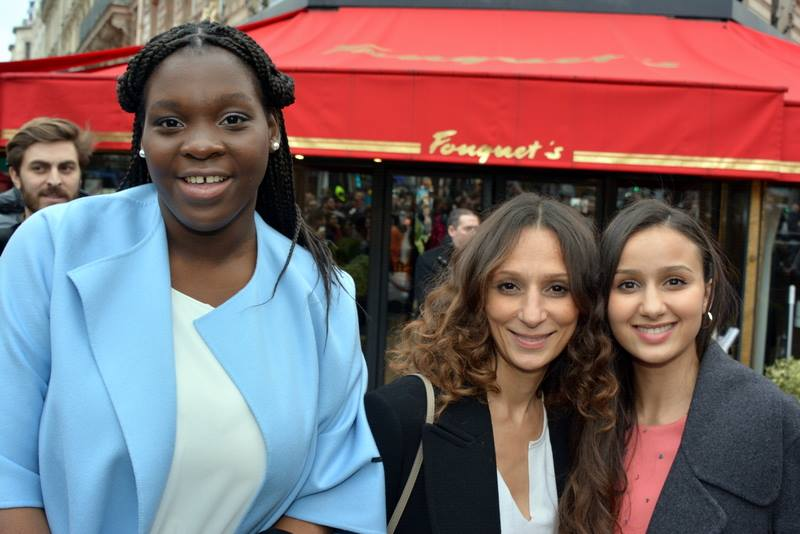
Left to right: actress Déborah Lukumuena, director Houda Benyamina, and actress Oulaya Amamra attend the luncheon for the 42nd César Awards.

- Oulaya Amamra as Dounia
- Déborah Lukumuena as Maimouna
- Kévin Mischel as Djigui
- Jisca Kalvanda as Rebecca
- Yasin Houicha as Samir
- Majdouline Idrissi as Myriam
- Mounir Margoum as Cassandra
- Farid Larbi as Reda

== Awards and accolades ==
List of accolades
Award / Film Festival	Date of Ceremony	Category	Recipient(s)	Result
2016 Cannes Film Festival	22 May 2016	Caméra d'Or	Houda Benyamina	Won
César Awards	24 February 2017	Best Film	Marc-Benoît Créancier	Nominated
César Awards	24 February 2017	Best Director	Houda Benyamina	Nominated
César Awards	24 February 2017	Best Supporting Actress	Déborah Lukumuena	Won
César Awards	24 February 2017	Most Promising Actress	Oulaya Amamra	Won
César Awards	24 February 2017	Best Original Screenplay	Romain Compingt, Houda Benyamina and Malik Rumeau	Nominated
César Awards	24 February 2017	Best Editing	Loïc Lallemand and Vincent Tricon	Nominated
César Awards	24 February 2017	Best First Feature Film	Houda Benyamina	Won
Munich Film Festival	July 2016	CineVision Award (best film by a new, non-German director)	Houda Benyamina	Won
Golden Globe Awards	8 January 2017	Best Foreign Language Film		Nominated
Hamptons International Film Festival	10 October 2016	HIFF Award for Best Narrative Feature Film	Houda Benyamina	Honorable Mention
60th London Film Festival	16 October 2016	Sutherland Award (best first feature in the festival)	Uda Benyamina, Oulaya Amamra	Special commendation
Lumière Awards	30 January 2017	Best Female Revelation	Oulaya Amamra	Won
Lumière Awards	30 January 2017	Best Female Revelation	Déborah Lukumuena	Won
Lumière Awards	30 January 2017	Best First Film		Won
