= The Sin (1965 film) =

- Directed by: Henry Barakat
- Written by: Youssef Idriss; Saad al-Din Wahbah
- Starring: Faten Hamama; Zaki Rostom; Abdullah Gaith
- Distributed by: Columbia Pictures
- Release dates: 1965 (Egypt); March 11, 1974 (USA)
- Running time: 105 minutes
- Country: Egypt
- Language: Arabic

The Sin (Arabic: الحرام, translit. Al Haram) is a classical 1965 Egyptian drama film directed by Henry Barakat. The film stars Faten Hamama, Zaki Rostom, and Abdullah Gaith and is based on a novel by the same title by Yūsuf Idrīs. The film was nominated for the Prix International award at the 1965 Cannes Film Festival. It was also chosen as one of the best 100 Egyptian film productions in the Egyptian cinema centennial. A survey by Al-Fonoon magazine in 1984 chose it as one of the best ten films in Top 100 films the history of Egyptian cinema.

== Plot ==
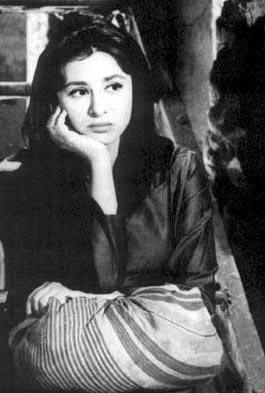
Fatin Hamama in The Sin

Azizah, a poor peasant, portrays the oppression of workers in this somber social drama. She is brutally assaulted by a guard while gathering potatoes in the fields. She does not disclose the incident to her husband, who is ill. She keeps her pregnancy a secret and, after giving birth, ends the baby's life. She then dies. Migrant workers rally in her memory, as she becomes a symbol of the struggle for the rights of peasants.

== Reception ==
The film has been included in the 2006 Bibliotheca Alexandrina's 100 Greatest Egyptian Films.

The newspaper Le Monde wrote: "we have been attracted to this film due to the true picture that reflects the suffering of this village, the picture is not about a problem for one individual, it’s about the reflection of everything surrounding her, from people to culture."

== Cast ==
- Faten Hamama as Azizah.
- Zaki Rostom as the guard.
- Abdullah Gaith as Aziza's husband.
