= Oulaya Amamra =

French actress

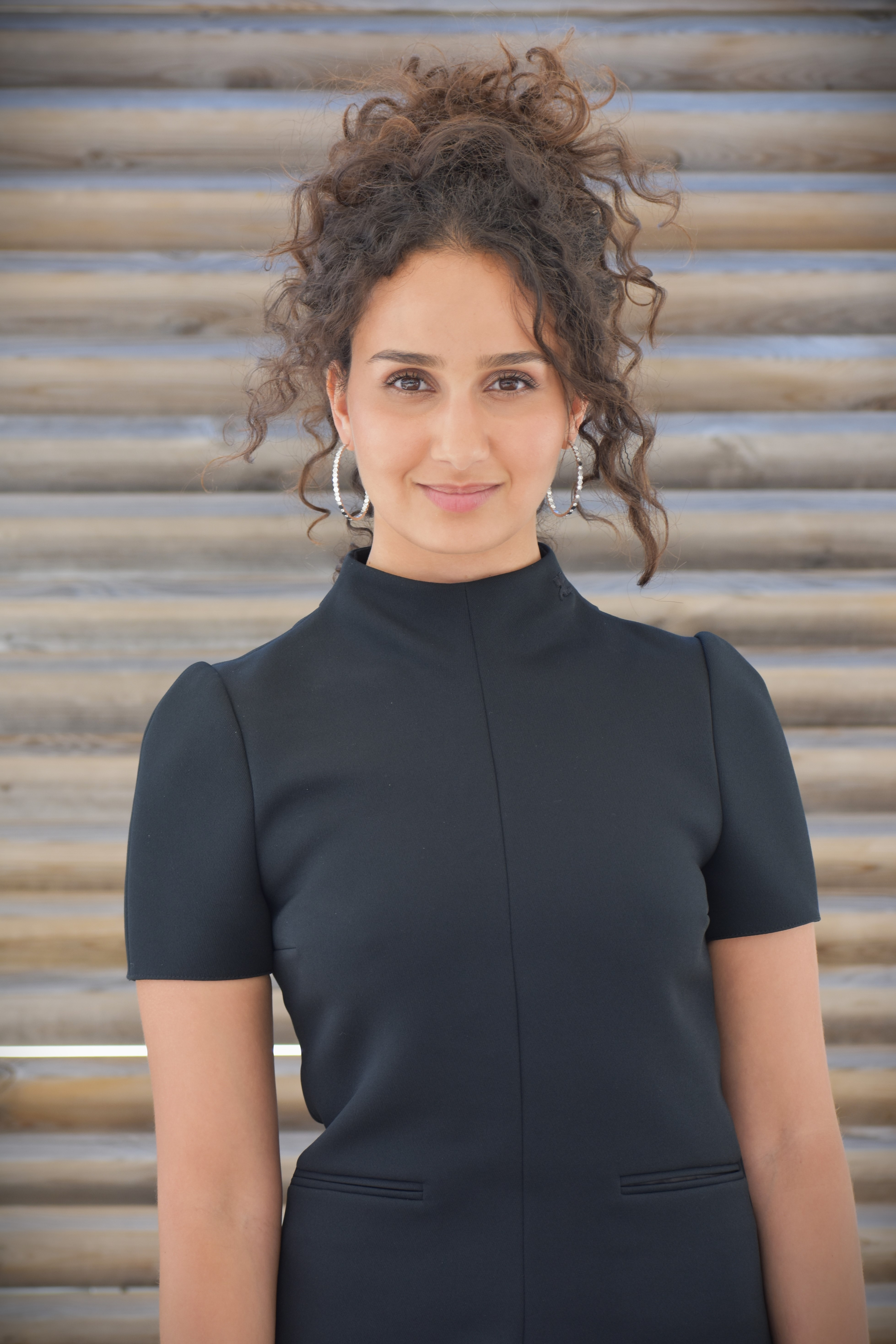
- Amamra at 2024 Cannes Film Festival
- Born: 12 November 1996 (age 28)
- Occupation: Actress
- Years active: 2010–present
- Relatives: Houda Benyamina (sister)

Oulaya Amamra (born 12 November 1996) is a French actress known for starring in the 2016 films Divines and Tamara. She won the César Award for Most Promising Actress and the Lumière Award for Best Female Revelation for Divines.

== Personal life ==
Amamra was born in France to a Moroccan father and Algerian mother. She is the younger sister of director Houda Benyamina. Amamra attended Catholic school and studied classical dance for 15 years.

Benyamina cast Amamra for a lead role in Divines, although she was initially concerned that the project could threaten their relationship.

== Filmography ==
Year	Title	Role	Director	Notes
2010	Fracture	Student	Alain Tasma	TV movie
2012	Le commencement		Guillaume Tordjman	Short
2014	Ghetto Child		Houda Benyamina & Guillaume Tordjman	
2014	3xManon	Yaël	Jean-Xavier de Lestrade	TV miniseries
2015	L'orchestre des aveugles	Chama	Mohamed Mouftakir	Moroccan film (Arabic)
2015	Belle gueule	Sarah	Emma Benestan	Short
2015	Un métier bien	Soraya	Farid Bentoumi	Short
2016	Divines	Dounia	Houda Benyamina	César Award for Most Promising Actress; Lumière Award for Best Female Revelation; AFI Fest Special Mention Acting; Carthage Film Festival Best Actress
2016	Tamara	Jelilah	Alexandre Castagnetti	
2016	Mariam	Mariam	Faiza Ambah	Short
2016	Mr Gaspacho	Julie	Guillaume Tordjman	Short
2017	La bête curieuse	Asma	Laurent Perreau	TV movie
2018	The World Is Yours	Lamya	Romain Gavras	
2018	The Little Drummer Girl	Salma	Park Chan-wook	TV miniseries
2019	Farewell to the Night	Lila Saïdi	André Téchiné	
2020	The Salt of Tears	Djemila	Philippe Garrel	
2020	Vampires	Doina Radescu		
2022	Smoking Causes Coughing	Ammoniaque	Mr. Oizo	
2022	Citoyen d'honneur	Selma	Mohamed Hamidi	
2025	How Are You? (Comment ça va?),	Voice role (Penguin)	Caroline Poggi and Jonathan Vinel	Short animated film screened in Berlinale 2025 on 15 February.
