= The Hyena's Sun =

1977 Holland-Tunisian drama film

The Hyena’s Sun
- Directed by: Ridha Behi
- Written by: Ridha Behi
- Produced by: Willem Thijssen
- Starring: Salah Benmoussa; Hélène Catzaras; Larbi Doghmi; Tewfik Guiga; Mahmoud Moursy; Ahmed Snoussi
- Cinematography: Theo van de Sande
- Music by: Nicola Piovani
- Production companies: Newin Productions; Stichting Fugitive Cinema
- Distributed by: Essential Cinema
- Release date: 2 March 1978; (the Netherlands)
- Running time: 104 minutes
- Countries: Tunisia; Netherlands
- Language: French

The Hyena's Sun (originally as Soleil des Hyènes) is a 1977 Dutch-Tunisian drama film directed by Ridha Behi and produced by Willem Thijssen. The film stars Salah Benmoussa and Hélène Catzaras in the lead roles whereas Larbi Doghmi, Tewfik Guiga, Mahmoud Moursy and Ahmed Snoussi made supportive roles. The film deals with changes occur within the residents of a small Tunisian fishing village when a resort is built by German merchants.

The film made its premiere on 2 March 1978 in the Netherlands. The film received mixed reviews from critics. In 1977, the film was nominated for the Golden Charybdis award at the Taormina International Film Festival. The film was selected for the Directors' Fortnight of the Cannes Film Festival the same year. In 1979, director won the grand prize at the Damascus International Film Festival and the Truth Prize at the 6th Panafrican Film and Television Festival of Ouagadougou (FESPACO).

== Cast ==
- Salah Benmoussa
- Hélène Catzaras as Mariem
- Larbi Doghmi as Haj Ibrahim (as Doghmi Larbi)
- Tewfik Guiga as Slim
- Mahmoud Moursy as Lamine
- Ahmed Snoussi as Tahar
- El Ghazi
- Mohamed El Habachi
- Mohamed Jalali
- Mohammed Mehdi
- Mourad Methkal
- El Omari as Omda
- Aicha Rachidi
- Mustapha Zaari
