= Larbi =

- Directed by: Driss Mrini
- Written by: Driss Mrini
- Starring: Hanane Ibrahimi, Fadila Benmoussa, Bouchra Ahriche, Alexandre Ottoveggio
- Cinematography: Youssef Laalioui
- Edited by: Meryem Chadli
- Music by: Younes Megri
- Release date: 2011
- Running time: 105 minutes
- Country: Morocco
- Language: Moroccan Arabic

Larbi (Larbi ou le destin d'un grand footballeur) is a 2011 Moroccan film directed by Driss Mrini. The film was inspired by the life of football player Larbi Benbarek.

== Synopsis ==
The film chronicles the life of football player Larbi Benbarek.

== Cast ==
- Hanane Ibrahimi
- Fadila Benmoussa
- Bouchra Ahriche
- Abdelhak Belmjahed
- Mohamed Khashla
- Mouhsine Mouhtadi
- Marion Despouys
- Alexandre Ottovegio
