= Hassan Al-Jundi =

Moroccan dramatic artist

Mohammed Hassan El Joundi
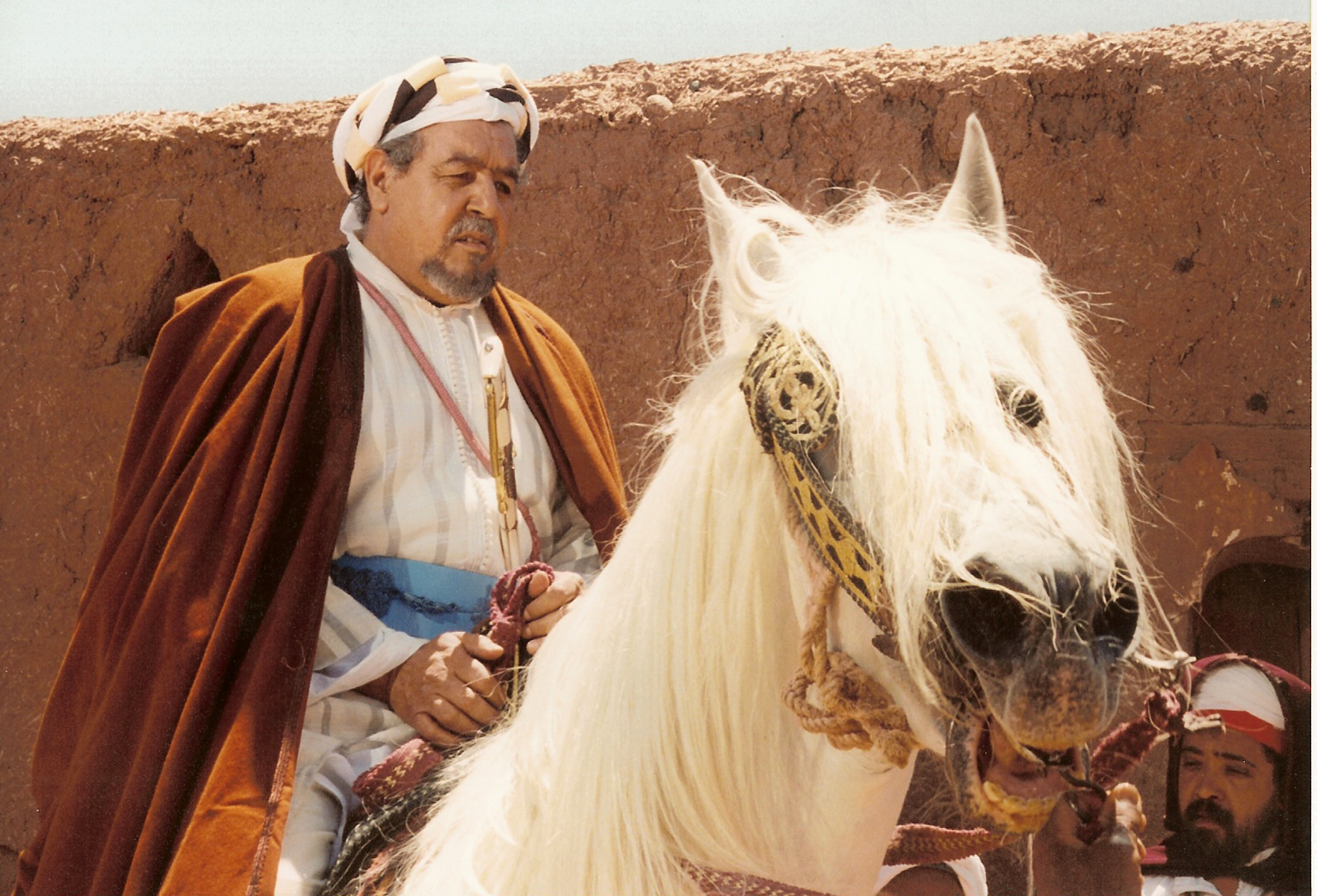
- Mohammed Hassan El Joundi in the series The Last Cavalier
- Born: Mohammed Hassan El Joundi; 1939; Marrakesh, French protectorate in Morocco
- Died: February 25, 2017 (aged 77–78); Marrakesh, Morocco
- Education: Ben Youssef Madrasa
- Occupations: actor; director; producer; screenwriter
- Years active: 1950–2017
- Notable work: The message, Al Qadisia, Al Azalia, Poet of Alhambra, Omar
- Spouse: Fatima Benmeziane (1959–1981) divorced Hayat Zeroual (1982–until his death)

Mohammed Hassan Al-Jundi (Arabic: محمد حسن الجندي) (1939–2017) was a major Moroccan figure of art, theater and cinema. He was an author, film director and actor. He is considered one of the most famous and popular actors in Morocco and the Arab world. He has excelled in historical roles and is also regarded as one of the main pillars of Moroccan theater.

== Early life ==
Al-Jundi was born on 1938 in Marrakesh, into an Amazigh family. His father was one of the sheikhs of the Tijaniyya Sufi order, which enriched his upbringing with religious and cultural values. He began his education in a Quranic school (kuttab), then joined Ben Youssef Madrasa, where he focused on Sharia and religious studies. In 1946, he enrolled in the Hassania School, which was run by a prominent nationalist leader. It was there that he was introduced to theater for the first time, igniting his passion for art and literature.

== Career ==
He was a prolific radio and theater writer who directed and starred in projects for radio, television, and theater from the 1950s until his death in 2017, including his fantasy series Al Azalia. A pioneer of musical theater in the Middle East and North Africa, he performed in venues around the world.

Some of his most memorable performances include Abu Jahl, Amr ibn Hisham in the Arabic version of the movie The Message, Rustam in the film Qadisiyah, Utbah ibn Rabiah in the 2012's historical drama Umar ibn al-Khattab, Hamadi in the 2011 film Taalab Assilah and Moha in the short series Ghadba.

On February 18, one week before his death, he attended the launch and signing of his autobiographical novel Weld Laksour at Casablanca International Book Fair. It was his last project.

== Works ==
=== Films ===
- 1976: The Message
- 1981: Al Qadisiyya
- 1982: Mutawi and Bahiya
- 1983: Bamou
- 1990: The Battle of the Three Kings
- 1996: L’ombre du Pharaon
- 2011: Taalab Assilah
- 2012: Omar

=== Series ===
- 2002: The Hawk of Quraish
- 2004: The Knight of Banu Marwa
- 2012: Omar
- 2013: The Last Cavalier

== Gallery ==
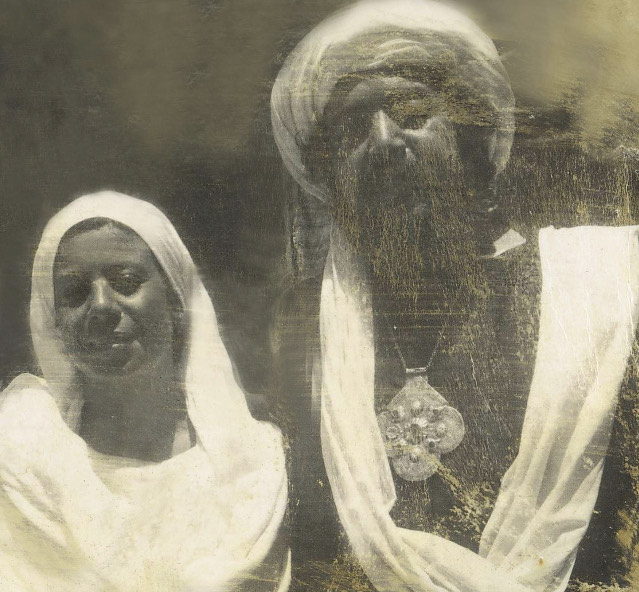
Mohammed Hassan with his wife while acting in the film "The Message".

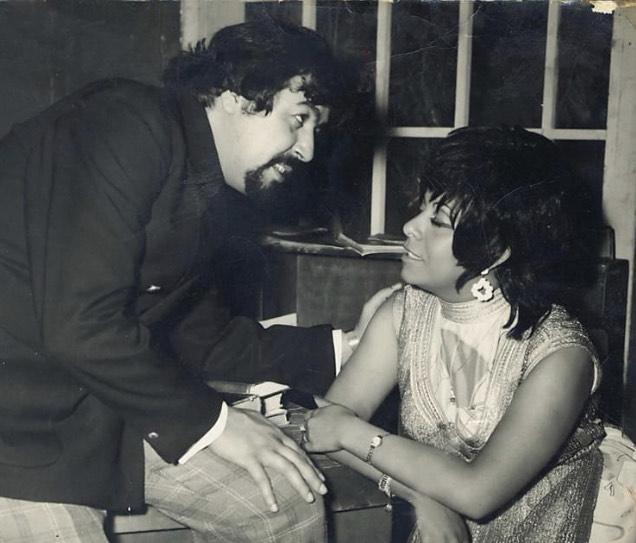
Mohammed Hassan and Fatima Benmezian in 1965 during the Theater play "Ana u Chama".
