= Larbi Doghmi =

Moroccan actor

- Born: 1931; Rabat
- Died: 28 October 1994 (aged 62–63); Rabat
- Citizenship: Morocco
- Occupation: Actor
- Notable work: The Man Who Would Be King

Larbi Doghmi (born in 1931 in Rabat, died 28 October 1994 in Rabat) was a Moroccan actor. He starred in numerous Moroccan films and television shows, and was known for his sound dubbing of Bollywood films. He also has to his credit international films such as The Man Who Would Be King, where he portrayed Ootah.

== Filmography ==
- 1955 : Le médecin malgré lui
- 1968 : Quand mûrissent les dattes
- 1975 : The Man Who Would Be King
- 1977 : The Hyena's Sun
- 1977 : Blood Wedding
- 1979 : The Black Stallion
- 1982 : Brahim yach
- 1983 : Bamou
- 1983 : The Black Stallion Returns
- 1986 : Allan Quatermain and the Lost City of Gold
- 1988 : Caftan of Love
- 1991 : Le Vent de la Toussaint
