= Vampires (TV series) =

2020 French-language television series

- Release poster
- Genre: drama; fantasy; horror
- Created by: Benjamin Dupas; Isaure Pisani-Ferry
- Starring: Oulaya Amamra; Suzanne Clément; Aliocha Schneider; Kate Moran; Mounir Amamra; Juliette Cardinski; Pierre Lottin
- Country of origin: France
- Original language: French
- No. of seasons: 1
- No. of episodes: 6

Original release
- Release: 20 March 2020

Vampires is a 2020 French-language supernatural horror television series created by Benjamin Dupas and Isaure Pisani-Ferry and starring Oulaya Amamra, Suzanne Clément, Aliocha Schneider, Kate Moran, Mounir Amamra and Juliette Cardinski.

The plot revolves around Doina (Oulaya Amamra), a vampire girl who suppress her vampire tendencies by taking pills, and who lives with her mother, Martha (Suzanne Clément).

It was released on 20 March 2020 on Netflix.

== Cast ==
- Oulaya Amamra as Doina Radescu
- Suzanne Clément as Martha Radescu
- Aliocha Schneider as Ladislas Nemeth
- Kate Moran as Csilla Nemeth
- Mounir Amamra as Andrea Radescu
- Juliette Cardinski as Irina Radescu
- Pierre Lottin as Rad Radescu
- Dylan Robert as Nacer
- Antonia Buresi as Elise
- Bilel Chegrani as Moji
- Theo Hakola as Gabor Nemeth
- Ayumi Roux as Clarisse
- Jalal Altawil as Stan
- Jonathan Genet as Auguste
- Marilú Marini as Belen

== Release ==
Vampires was released on 20 March 2020 on Netflix.
