= Girl (2023 film) =

- Theatrical release poster
- Directed by: Adura Onashile
- Written by: Adura Onashile
- Produced by: Rosie Crerar; Ciara Barry
- Starring: Déborah Lukumuena; Danny Sapani; Le'Shantey Bonsu
- Cinematography: Tasha Back
- Edited by: Stella Heath Keir
- Music by: Ré Olunuga
- Production companies: barry crerar; iFeatures; BBC Film; BFI; Screen Scotland
- Distributed by: Studio Soho (United Kingdom and Ireland; New Europe Film Sales (Worldwide)
- Release date: 22 January 2023 (Sundance)
- Running time: 87 minutes
- Country: United Kingdom
- Language: English

Girl is a 2023 British drama film written and directed by Adura Onashile in her feature debut. It premiered at the 2023 Sundance Film Festival. Filmed and set in Glasgow, Girl opened the Glasgow Film Festival.

== Cast ==
- Déborah Lukumuena as Grace
- Danny Sapani as Samuel
- Le'Shantey Bonsu as Ama
- Lana Turner as Fiona
- Ayesha Antoine as Lisa
- Caroline Deyga as Mhairi
- Jenni Keenan Green as Ms. Seample
- Owen Whitelaw as Ian
- Mark Cox as Alan

== Production ==
Adura Onashile began developing Girl in 2017 with Rosie Crerar and Ciara Barry of the production company barry crerar. barry crerar also produced Onashile's short film Expensive Shit (2020). Girl was developed with iFeatures and BBC Film, and received support from the British Film Institute (BFI) and Screen Scotland.

The production team decided to search internationally when casting the lead character Grace and happened upon French actress Déborah Lukumuena. Le'Shantey Bonsu was scouted for the role of Ama through her primary school's drama programme in Leeds. Onashile incorporated elements from Lukumuena and Bonsu's backgrounds into the film. Also starring in the film are Danny Sapani and Liana Turner.

Principal photography took place in Glasgow over the course of six weeks and wrapped in October 2021.
