= Brahim Who? =

- Directed by: Nabyl Lahlou
- Written by: Nabyl Lahlou
- Starring: Larbi Doghmi, Nadia Atbib, Amina Rachid
- Cinematography: Mostapha Marjane
- Edited by: Nabyl Lahlou
- Music by: Mohamed Balkhayat
- Release date: 1982
- Running time: 99 minutes
- Country: Morocco
- Language: Moroccan Arabic
- Budget: 600.000 MAD

Brahim Who? (إبراهيم ياش, Brahim yach?) is a 1982 Moroccan drama film directed by Nabyl Lahlou. It was screened at multiple national and international film festivals, including the Berlin International Film Festival.

== Synopsis ==
The film tells the story of story of a Brahim Boumalfi, a retiree who, after working for fifty years at the same company, has not received a pension in over two years.

== Cast ==
- Larbi Doghmi
- Nadia Atbib
- Amina Rachid
- Hammadi Ammor
- Allal Saadi
- Mostafa Hassan Belhadj
