= Naoufel Berraoui =

Moroccan filmmaker

- Education: Institut Supérieur d'Art Dramatique et d'Animation Culturelle in Rabat.
- Occupations: filmmaker, actor, and decorator.
- Notable work: Youm ou lila
- Spouse: Touria Alaoui

Naoufel Berraoui is a Moroccan filmmaker, actor, and decorator.

== Personal life ==
Berraoui is married to Moroccan actress Touria Alaoui. He attended the High Institute of Theatrical Arts and Cultural Animation in Rabat.

== Partial filmography ==
- Liberté provisoire (2007)
- Youm ou lila (2013)
