= Abdullah Gaith =

Egyptian actor

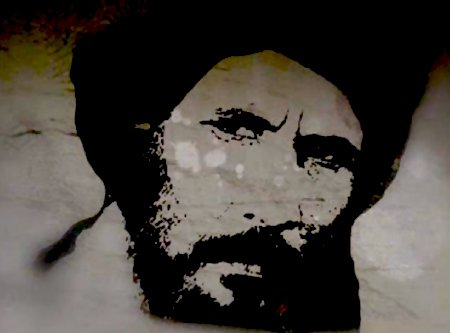
- Born: 28 January 1930; Kafr Shalshalmon, Sharqia, Egypt
- Died: 12 March 1993 (aged 63)
- Education: High Institute of Theatrical Arts
- Occupation: Actor
- Years active: 1930-1993

Abdullah Gaith (28 January 1930 – 12 March 1993) was an Egyptian actor. He was the younger brother of actor Hamdi Gaith, who died in 2006.

Abdullah Gaith was born in a village called Kafr Al-Shalshalmoon in the province of Sharqia Governorate, Egypt. He studied theatre at the High Institute of Theatrical Arts.

Among his theatrical works are: Al-Husain as a Rebel (Al-Husain Tha'eran- in Arabic), Mahran the Youth (Al Fata Mahran), and The Visit of the Aging Woman (Ziarat Al-Sayyidah Al-Ajuz).

Among his numerous works in TV : Sukun Al-Asifah (The Calm of the Storm) (1978), Ibn Taimeyyah (1984), Musa ibn Nusayr (the great Arab Muslim ruler of Africa who managed the conquest of Spain), Abu Zaid Al-Hilali (1979), Antarah (1979), Al-Sindibad (1985), and Al-Kitabah Ala Lahmin Yahtariq (Writing on Burning Flesh) (1986).

Ghaith's most famous work in cinema is Mohammad, Messenger of God (U.S. title: The Message) (1976) which narrates the story of the rise of Islam.

== Later life and death ==
Abdullah Gaith died on 12 March 1993 of cancer.

== Filmography ==
Year	Title	Role	Notes
1964	Adham al-Sharqawi		
1965	Al Haram (The Sin)		
	Al-Simmal Wal Kharif (The Autumn's Quail)		Based on the novel by Naguib Mahfouz
1976	Mohammad, Messenger of God	Hamza ibn 'Abd al-Muttalib	
1988	Milaff Samiah Sharawi (The File of Samiah Sharawi)	Abdel Hakim Amer	
