= Said Naciri =

Moroccan actor, film director and screenwriter (born 1960)

- Said Naciri in 2016
- Born: September 25, 1960 (age 65); Casablanca, Morocco
- Occupations: Actor comedian producer

Said Naciri (also known as Saeed El Nasry or Saïd Naciri) (born in Casablanca in 1960) is a Moroccan actor, comedian and producer.

== Biography ==
He has appeared in a number of Moroccan TV programs and feature films.

In 2000, his play 'Thief but honest' was showcased in the theater. He produced his first feature film, Ouled Derb (in French Le Pote) which was directed by Hassan Benjelloun. In 2003, he embarked on a career as a director with his feature film Les Bandits where he holds the male lead role.

== Filmography ==
- 2003 : The Bandits
- 2005 : Game with Wolves
- 2006 : Abdou among the Almohads
- 2009 : "a husband to rent"
- 2010 : Al khattaf
- 2011 : A Moroccan in Paris
- 2013: Sara
- 2015: The Transporters

== Television ==
Saïd Naciri directed many telefilms and TV debates for Moroccan television.

- Ana ou khouya ou Mratou in 1998 on TVM
- Ana ou Mrati ou Nsabi in 1999 on TVM
- Rbib in 2004 sur 2M, with the participation of Mustapha El Atrassi.
- Al Awni in 2005 on 2M, with the participation of Siham Assif, Amina Rachid.
- Al Awni Deuxième partie in 2007 on 2M
- Nsiib Al Haj Azzooz in 2009 on 2M
- Le Bandit(la série) in 2011 on 2M
- l'khetaf in 2011
- Tebdal Lemnazel in 2014 on Al Aoula

== Televised debates ==
- Alach la in 1999 on TVM
- Ataja in 2000 on the TVM

One man show

- Di KOKO in 1989
- Tetanos in 1995
- My friends the ministers in 2003
- Moroccan 100% in 2007
- Lalla el houkouma in 2014
- Do you speak english in 2016

== Other works ==
- Malhama: Abtal Al Watan music video
