= Driss Mrini =

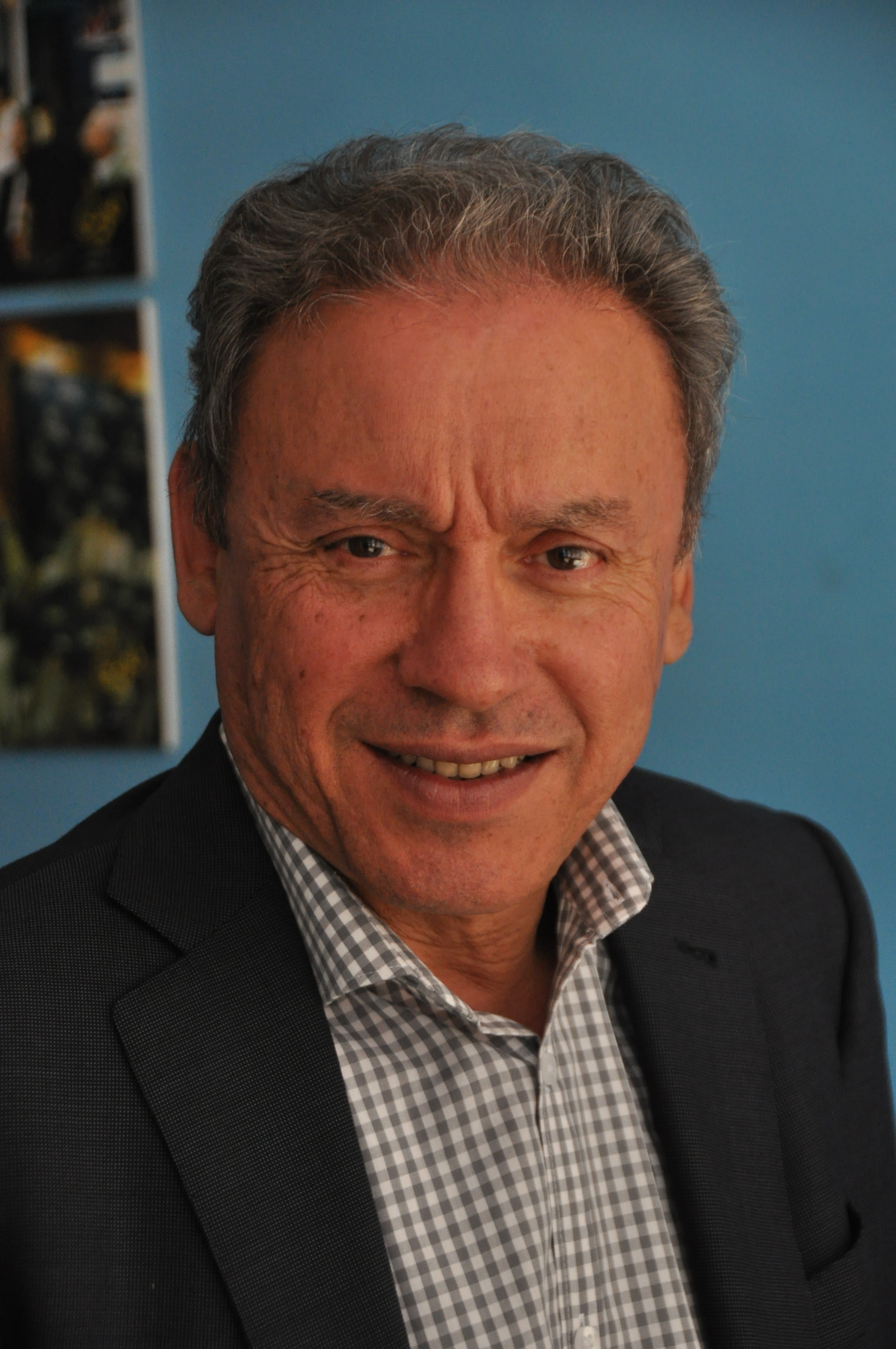
- Born: إدريس المريني; 11 February 1950 (age 76); Salé
- Education: University of Hamburg
- Occupations: film and television director
- Notable work: Aida

Driss Mrini (born 11 February 1950) is a Moroccan film and television director, producer and writer.

== Biography ==
He was born in Salé in 1950 and left to study communication at the University of Hamburg in Germany. After working as an assistant in television production in Germany, he returned to Morocco. Shortly after, he joined the Moroccan national television and made several documentaries.

His film Aida was chosen to represent Morocco in the Oscars 2016.

== Work ==
Driss Mrini has produced several films, documentaries and TV programs. Some of the films are:

- 1983 : Bamou
- 2011 : Larbi
- 2015 : Aida
- 2017: Lahnech
