= Aida (2015 film) =

2015 film

- Directed by: Driss Mrini
- Written by: Driss Mrini
- Release date: 22 February 2015
- Running time: 94 minutes
- Country: Morocco
- Languages: Moroccan Arabic (Darija); Hebrew; French

Aida (Arabic: عايدة) is a 2015 Moroccan drama film directed by Driss Mrini. The film was selected as the Moroccan entry for the Best Foreign Language Film at the 88th Academy Awards but it was not nominated.

== See also ==
- List of submissions to the 88th Academy Awards for Best Foreign Language Film
- List of Moroccan submissions for the Academy Award for Best Foreign Language Film
