= Swel Noury =

Moroccan film director

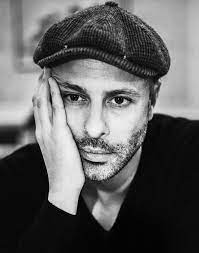

Swel Noury is a Spanish-Moroccan filmmaker.

== Biography ==
Swel Noury Cazorla was born in Casablanca, lived in Paris, Barcelona, and Bangkok before settling in Madrid. He is the son of renowned Moroccan director Hakim Noury and the Spanish producer Pilar Cazorla. He attended ESCP Europe Business School in Paris and worked in investment banking before giving it all up to focus on his passion: writing and creating his own works of fiction. During this period, he traveled a great deal around the globe, which contributed to his universal vision of the world. His feature films include “Heaven’s Doors” (2006) and “The Man Who Sold The World” (2009), both selected in the official selection of the Berlinale – Panorama section. While writing and directing his feature films, he also spent time shooting commercials, writing commissioned scripts, and developing his photographic work.

In 2019, he co-founds the production company Two Flavours to focus on developing universal appealing stories.

== Filmography ==
- 2006: Heaven's Doors (Les portes du paradis)
- 2009: The Man Who Sold The World
- 2012: Elle est diabétique 3
