= Stolen Childhood (film) =

Film

- French: L'Enfance volée
- Directed by: Hakim Noury
- Release date: 1994
- Country: Morocco
- Language: French

L'Enfance volée (Stolen Childhood) is a 1994 Moroccan film by Hakim Noury. It is one of Noury's most popular and influential films. The film is set in Casablanca and tells the story of the abuse of a young servant girl.
