= Ali Ahmad Bakathir =

Egyptian-Yemeni poet and dramatist

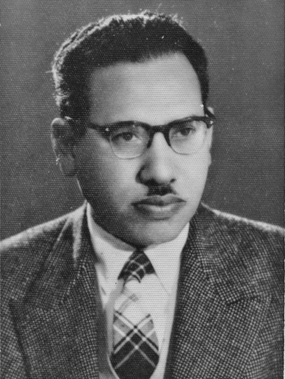
- Born: 21 December 1910; Surabaya, Indonesia
- Died: 10 November 1969 (aged 58); Cairo, Egypt
- Education: Cairo University; Institute of Education for Teachers
- Occupations: Poet; playwright; novelist; translator
- Notable work: Epic of Omar (play); Oh Islam! (novel); The Red Revolutionary (novel)
- Awards: State Prize of Appreciation

Ali bin Ahmad bin Mohammed Bakathir (21 December 1910 - 10 November 1969) (Arabic: علي أحمد باكثير) was an Egyptian poet, playwright and novelist of Hadrami origin, who is Indonesian-born. He was a prominent playwright, his best-known play was Epic of Omar (original: Malhamat Omar). He also wrote historical novels, the most famous being Oh Islam! (original: Wa Islamah) and The Red Revolutionary (original: Ath-thaa'er Al-Ahmar). He is also a translator, for he translated Shakespeare's Romeo & Juliet. Bakathir was awarded many medals, including the State Prize of Appreciation, shared equally with Naguib Mahfouz.

== Early life ==
He was born on December 21, 1910, in Surabaya, Indonesia to urban parents from Hadramaut. When he reached the age of 10, his father took him to Hadramaut, where he grew up in an Arab-Islamic environment with his siblings. He arrived in the city of Sayyoun, Hadramaut on April 5, 1920, and there he was educated at the Al-Nahda Scientific School. He studied Arabic and Sharia sciences at the hands of highly respected sheikhs, including his uncle, Poet, Linguist and Judge Mohammed bin Mohammad Bakathir. He was taught religious sciences by Faqih Mohammed bin Hadi Al-Saqqaf. And he was one of Faqih and Linguist Mohammed Abdullah Al-Saqqaf's peers. Growing up, Bakathir acquired many talents, at 13 years old, he had started composing poetry, and under the age of 20, he had become a teacher and an administrator at Al-Nahda Scientific School.

== Marriage ==
Bakathir married early in 1927, but he was heartbroken by the death of his wife, who was very young, so he left Hadramaut around 1931 and went to Aden then Somalia and Ethiopia and finally settled in Hejaz for some time. In Hejaz, he wrote his first verse drama, Humam In the Land of the Dunes (original: Humam fi Bilad al-Ahqaf) and printed it in Egypt.

== Egypt ==
He arrived in Egypt in 1934 and attended King Fuad I University (currently known as Cairo University), where he received a Bachelor of Arts from the English Department in 1939. In 1936, and during his studies at the university, he translated Shakespeare’s Romeo & Juliet into blank verse poetry. Two years later he composed his play, Akhnaton and Nefertiti in free verse poetry and became the pioneer of this poetic style in Arabic literature. After graduating from the university, he joined the Institute of Education for Teachers and received his diploma in 1940. He worked as an English teacher for 14 years. In 1954, Bakathir went on a study mission to France.

After completing his studies, he took up residence in Egypt where he loved the Egyptian society, and he married into a conservative Egyptian family. He had a close connection with intellectuals and writers such as, al-Aqqad, Tawfiq al-Hakim, al-Mazini, Muhibb-ud-Deen Al-Khatib, Naguib Mahfouz and others. In an interview with Aden Radio in 1968, Bakathir said that he was classified as the second Arab playwright after Tawfiq al-Hakim.

Bakathir taught for 14 years, ten of which were spent in Mansoura, the rest in Cairo. In 1955, he moved to work for the Ministry of Culture in the department of literature, then moved to the Antiquities Authority and continued working in the Ministry until his death.

== Second marriage and Egyptian citizenship ==
He married an Egyptian woman who had a daughter from a previous marriage in 1943, the daughter grew up under the wing of Bakathir, who never had children of his own. In August 1951, he was granted Egyptian citizenship by royal decree.

== Languages ==
He was fluent in English, French and Malay as well as Arabic.

== Epic of Omar and Napoleon's invasion of Egypt ==
Bakathir was granted a two-year sabbatical (1961-1963), in which he completed the Islamic epic of caliph Omar ibn Al-Khattab, which consisted of 19 parts. It is considered the second longest drama in the world. Bakathir was the first writer to be granted this leave in Egypt. He was also granted another sabbatical, during which he completed the Napoleon's invasion of Egypt trilogy, The Worm and The Snake (original: al-Dūdah wa-al-thuʻbān), Napoleon's Dreams (original: Aḥlām Nābuliyūn), and Zainab's Tragedy (original: Maʼsāt Zaynab). The first one was printed in his lifetime, while the latter two after his death.

== Works ==
Bakathir's works consisted of a wide variety of literary works. He is known for his novels, Oh Islam! (original: Wa Islamah) and The Red Revolutionary (original: Ath-thaa'er Al-Ahmar). In addition, The Secret of Shahrazad (original: Sirr Shahrazād), which was translated to French, and The Tragedy of Oedipus (original: Maʼsāt Ūdīb), which was translated to English, are his most famous dramas.

He also wrote many one-act political and historical plays, which he published in famous newspapers and magazines at the time. He published three in his lifetime, the rest of the plays, however, have yet to be published in a book.

Bakathir never published his poems in a collection of poetry in his lifetime. His poems are either handwritten or scattered around in various newspapers and magazines where he used to publish them. In 1987, Professor Muhammed Abu Bakr Hamid issued Bakathir's first collection of poetry, which includes the poems he wrote in Hadramaut. And recently (in 2008) his second collection of poetry was issued by Konooz Al Marefa Bookstore in Jeddah. It includes the poems Bakathir wrote in 1932 and 1933, the time he spent in Aden after his departure from Hadramaut. Bakathir's third collection of poetry, which he wrote in 1934, the year he spent in Saudi Arabia before migrating to Egypt, is currently being published.

=== Plays ===
- The Chain of Sin and Forgiveness (original: al-Silsilah wa-al-Ghufran)
- The Drama of Politics (original: Masrah al-Siyasa)
- The Night of the River (original: Laylat al-nahr)
- The Lost Bible (original: at-Tawrāh al-dāʼiʻah)
- Empire for Auction (original: Imbiraturiyya fi al-Mazad)
- The Return of Paradise (original: ʻAwdat al-firdaws)
- Zainab's Tragedy (original: Maʼsāt Zaynab)
- The Secret of al-Hakim bi Amrilla (original: Sirr al-Hakim bi Amrilla)
- From Seven Heavens Above (original: Min fawq Sab‘i Samāwāt)
- The Lord of Israel (original: Ilah Isra’il)
- Harut and Marut (original: Hārūt wa-Mārūt)
- The Secret of Shahrazad (original: Sirr Shahrazād)
- Cats and Mice (original: Qitat wa Fi’ran)
- The Chaotic World (original: al-Dunyā Fawdā)
- Juha's Nail (original: Mismār Juḥā)
- Lady Gulfadan (original: Gulfadan Hanim)
- The Tragedy of Oedipus (original: Maʼsāt Ūdīb)
- The House of the Son of Luqman (original: Dar Ibn Luqman)
- Ibrahim Pasha
- Basus War (original: Ḥarb al-basūs)
- Epic of Omar (original: Malhamat Omar)
- Humam In the Land of the Dunes (original: Humam fi Bilad al-Ahqaf)
- Romeo & Juliet (translation)
- Akhenaton and Nefertiti (original: Ikhnatun wa Nafirtiti)
- A Lover from Hadramaut (original: ʻĀshiq min Ḥaḍramawt)
- The Worm and The Snake (original: al-Dūdah wa-al-thuʻbān)
- The Promised Pharaoh (original: al-Fir’awn al-Maw’ud)
- The Eloquent Peasant (original: al-Fallah al-Fasih)
- Osiris (original: Uziris)
- Dr. Hazim (original: al-Duktur Hazim)
- The New Sherlock (original: Shayluk al-Jadid)

=== Novels ===
- The Red Revolutionary (original: Ath-thaa'er Al-Ahmar)
- The Biography of the Brave (original: Sīrat shujāʻ)
- Oh Islam! (original: Wa Islamah)
- The Handsome Warrior (original: al-faris al-jamīl)
- The Night of the River (original: Laylat al-nahr)
- Sallāmah of the Devout (original: Salāmat al-Qiss)

== Travels ==
He visited many countries including France, the United Kingdom, the Soviet Union and Romania, as well as many Arab countries such as Syria, Lebanon and Kuwait where Epic of Omar was printed. He also visited Turkey, where he intended to write an epic theatre play about the siege of Constantinople but passed away before starting it. In April 1968, he visited Hadramaut a year before his death.

== Death ==
Bakathir died of a severe heart attack in Egypt in Ramadan of November 1969 and was buried in the burial chamber of his Egyptian wife's family.

== Achievements ==
He participated in many literary and cultural conferences and was selected as a member of the poetry and story committee of The Supreme Council for Arts and Literature. He was also a member of the story club. He was also granted a sabbatical to write a historical epic about Omar ibn Al-Khattab.

He left behind a legacy that consists of a variety of literary works, as he wrote over sixty stories and novels, as well as prose and verse dramas that dealt with comedy and tragedy.

He received several awards including the State Prize of Appreciation, shared equally with Naguib Mahfouz. Theatre season in Egypt used to open annually with his play, Juha's Nail (original: Mismār Juḥā), the one where he predicted the occupation of Palestine. Moreover, his play, Oh Islam! (original: Wa Islamah), was adapted into film, and starred the famous Egyptian actor Ahmed Mazhar.
