= Hakim Noury =

Moroccan television and film director

- Citizenship: Moroccan
- Occupations: Television and Film director
- Notable work: L'Enfance volée

Hakim Noury is a Moroccan television and film director.

== Filmography ==
- L'Enfance volée - The stolen childhood
- Le destin d’une Femme - The destiny of a woman
- Le marteau et l’enclume -
- Histoire d’amour - A love story
- Un simple fait divers
- Fiha El Malha ou soukar ou mabghatch tmoute
- Qalaq - (Anxiety)
