= Caroline Poggi and Jonathan Vinel =

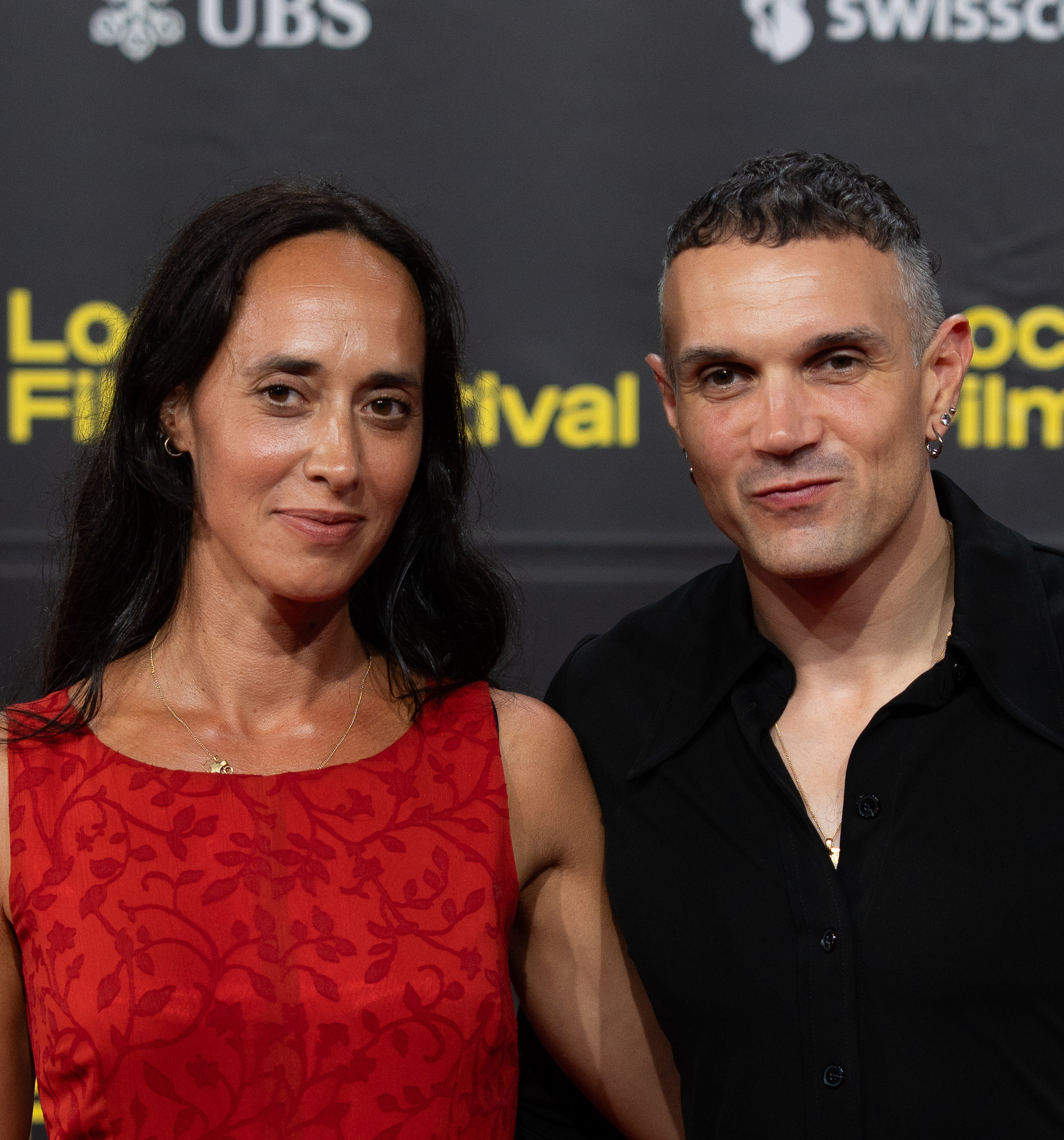
Poggi and Vinel at the 79th Locarno Film Festival in 2026

Caroline Poggi (born 1990) and Jonathan Vinel (born 1988) are a French filmmaking duo, whose debut feature film Jessica Forever premiered in 2018.

== Films ==
Poggi directed the short film Chiens in 2013 on her own, before collaborating with Vinel on As Long As Shotguns Remain (Tant qu'il nous reste des fusils à pompe), which won the Short Film Golden Bear at the 64th Berlin International Film Festival. They subsequently collaborated on the short films Our Legacy (Notre héritage) and After School Knife Fight, and Vinel was solo director of the short film Martin Cries (Martin pleure), before they released Jessica Forever, which premiered in the Platform Prize program at the 2018 Toronto International Film Festival.

They followed up with the short films Baby Anger (Bébé Colère) in 2020, Watch the Fire or Burn Inside It (Il faut regarder le feu ou brûler dedans) in 2022, and Best Secret Place in 2023.

Their second feature film, Eat the Night, premiered at the 2024 Cannes Film Festival, where it was a nominee for the Queer Palm.

In 2025, they directed an animated short film tilted How Are You? (Comment ça va?), which will be screened in Berlinale 2025 in Berlinale Shorts on 15 February 2025.
