= Houda Benyamina =

French director and screenwriter

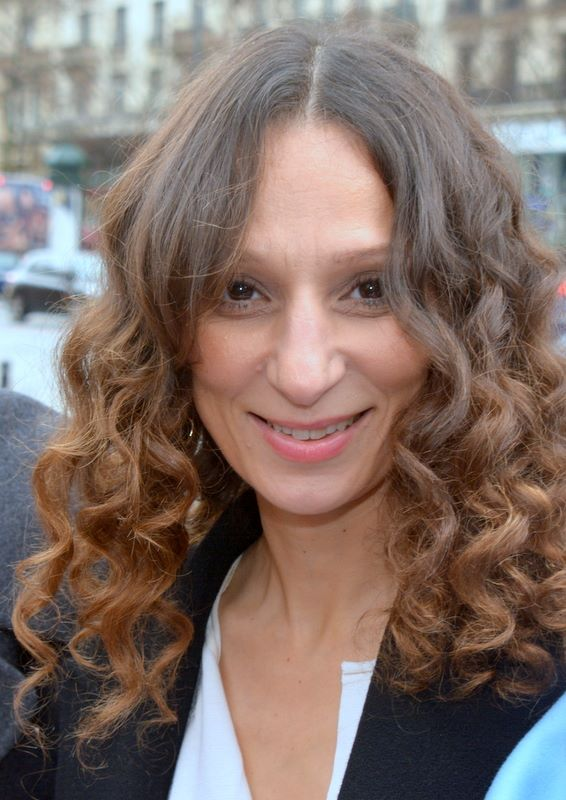
- Houda Benyamina at the 2017 César Awards luncheon.
- Born: 1980 (age 44–45); Viry-Châtillon, Essonne, France
- Occupation(s): Film director, screenwriter
- Years active: 2006–present
- Relatives: Oulaya Amamra (sister)

Houda Benyamina (born 1980) is a French director and screenwriter. She won the Cannes Film Festival Camera d'Or and César Award for Best First Feature Film for her 2016 film Divines.

== Career ==
In 2013, Benyamina directed the short film On the Road to Paradise. For Divines, Benyamina won the Camera d'Or, and Best First Film at the 42nd César Awards on 24 February, where she was also nominated for Best Director and shared a nomination for Best Original Screenplay.

== Personal life ==
Benyamina was born in Viry-Châtillon, Paris to a Moroccan father and Algerian mother. Her family includes younger sister Oulaya Amamra.

== Filmography ==
Films
Year	Film	Role	Notes
2013	On the Road to Paradise	Director	short film
2016	Divines	Director	
2024	All for One	Director, screenplay	

== Awards and nominations ==
Year	Film	Award/Film Festival	Category	Result
2016	Divines	2016 Cannes Film Festival	Caméra d'Or	Won
2016	Divines	César Awards	Best Director	Nominated
2016	Divines	César Awards	Best Original Screenplay	Nominated
2016	Divines	César Awards	Best First Feature Film	Won
2016	Divines	Munich Film Festival	CineVision Award	Won
2016	Divines	Hamptons International Film Festival	Best Narrative Feature Film	Honorable Mention
2016	Divines	60th London Film Festival	Sutherland Award	Special Commendation
