= Moroccan literature =

Moroccan literature are the written and oral works of Moroccan culture. These works have been produced and shared by people who lived in Morocco and the historical states that have existed partially or entirely within the geographical area of modern-day Morocco. Apart from the various forms of oral literature, the written literature of Morocco encompasses various genres, including poetry, prose, theater, and nonfiction including philosophical and religious literature. Moroccan literature has mainly been written in Arabic and French, and to a lesser extent also in Berber languages, Judeo-Arabic, Spanish, and after the mid-19th century in English.^{[pages needed]} Through translations into English and other languages, Moroccan literature has become accessible to readers worldwide.

Most of the literature written by Moroccans was created since the arrival of Islam in the 8th century, before which native Berber communities primarily had oral literary traditions.

== Introduction ==
Early works of Moroccan national literary history sought to affirm the place and contributions of Arabic literature in Morocco within the Arabic literary canon. Abdellah Guennoun's 1937 anthology An-Nubūgh al-Maghribī fī al-Adab al-'Arabī (النبوغ المغربي في الأدب العربي Moroccan Excellence in Arabic Literature)—generally regarded as the first work on the literary history of Morocco—places the origin of literature in Morocco at the arrival time of Arabic and Islam in North Africa. The poet Muḥammad Ibn al-ʿAbbās al-Qabbāj's 1929 anthology of Moroccan poets al-Adab al-ʿarabī fī al-Maghrib al-aqṣā had similar aims. Muḥammad Ibn Tāwīt's 1982 anthology al-Wafī fī al-adab al-‘arabī fī al-Maghrib al-aqṣā (Compendium of Arabic Literature in Morocco) largely followed the same pattern.

In the 1970s, writers such as ʿAbbās al-Jarārī, the first professor of Moroccan literature at a Moroccan university and author of the 1979 al-Adab al-maghribī min khilāl ḍawāhirihi wa-qaḍāyāhu (Moroccan Literature Through Its Phenomena and Issues), began to discuss the idea of a more geographically defined national 'Moroccan literature' as opposed to the idea of 'Arabic literature in Morocco.' In addition to affirming the place of Moroccan contributions within Arabic literature, al-Jarārī expanded the scope of literature in Morocco to include oral and popular culture in pre-Islamic Morocco, the culture of Western Sahara, and Andalusi literature. The interweaving of Moroccan and Andalusi literary traditions was a point of continuity between early writers such as Guennoun and al-Qabbāj and later writers such as al-Jarārī. Saʿīd Yaqṭīn described Moroccan literature as a “natural extension” (امتداد طبيعي) to Andalusi literature.

The term Maghrebin arose in the 1960s to denote the phenomenon of North African authors writing in French. Among them were Moroccan writers associated with the literary magazine Souffles-Anfas led by Abdellatif Laabi, including Abdelkebir Khatibi, Mohammed Berrada, and others. This trend embraced a more inclusive spirit in the consideration of literature and pushed against monolingualism and the hegemony of the Arab-Islamic national identity promoted by the old intellectual elite associated with the Moroccan Nationalist Movement. Scholars writing on the idea of Moroccan literature in French include Marc Gontard and Abderrahman Tenkoul.

By the early 21st century, conceptions of Moroccan literature became more capacious. Literature in Amazigh and Moroccan vernacular Arabic (Darija), neglected in earlier conceptions of literature in Morocco, started to gain recognition and prominence. The 2001 establishment of the Royal Institute of Amazigh Culture (IRCAM) had an important role in the recognition and promotion of Amazigh literature and culture. In the case of Darija, poets such as Ahmed Lemsyeh expounded upon heritage vernacular poetic forms such as zajal and malhun. Particularly following the 2011 Moroccan constitutional referendum, Sahrawi popular culture—including poetry, music, and folklore in Hassaniya Arabic—rose in importance in the construction of Moroccanness. 21st century conceptions of Moroccan literature also include works in various languages, by Moroccan writers living inside the territory of Morocco as well as abroad. Muḥammad Yaḥyā Qāsimī’s al-Adab al-maghribī al-muʿāṣir (1926-2007) ('Contemporary Moroccan Literature, 1926-2007'), which included works in Amazigh, Spanish, and English in addition to works in Arabic and French, was published by the Ministry or Culture in 2009.

== Mauro-Andalusi ==
Abdellah Guennoun, in his 1937 anthology an-Nubūgh al-Maghribī fī al-Adab al-'Arabī, cited the "Khutba of Tariq Ibn Ziyad", the Friday sermon given by Tariq ibn Ziyad at the time of the conquest of Iberia as the origin of the Arabic literary tradition in al-Maghrib al-Aqsa and wrote in response to Mashriqi scholars critical of the authenticity of the speech: "Ṭāriq Ibn Ziyād, even if of Berber origin, was brought up in the atmosphere of Arabness and Islam." Mohamed El Fassi described it as "the oldest Moroccan literary text" in his 1940 essay "La littérature marocaine." According to Gonzalo Fernández Parrilla and Eric Calderwood, citing Tariq ibn Ziyad's speech as the origin of Moroccan literature is a "rhetorical strategy" employed in "the effort to interweave Moroccan literature with the history of al-Andalus." Those making such claims have cited the fact that the territories were politically united under the Almoravid and Almohad empires. Additionally, a number of writers from medieval al-Andalus migrated to Morocco for different reasons; some, such as Al-Mu'tamid ibn Abbad, Maimonides, Ibn al-Khatib, and Leo Africanus were forced to leave, while others, such as Ibn Rushd, went in search of opportunity.

Yahya ibn Yahya al-Laythi, a Muslim scholar of Masmuda Berber ancestry and a grandson of one of the conquerors of al-Andalus, was responsible for spreading Maliki jurisprudence in al-Andalus and the Maghreb and is considered the most important transmitter of Malik ibn Anas's Muwatta (compilation of Hadith).

=== Idrissid period ===
Sebta, Tangier, Basra (a settlement founded by the Idrissids near al-Qasar al-Kebir), and Asilah were important cultural centers during the Idrissid period.

==== Barghwata ====
Al-Bakri mentions in his Book of Roads and Kingdoms that Salih ibn Tarif, king of the Barghawata, professed to be a prophet, and claimed that a new Quran was revealed to him. Ibn Khaldun also mentions the "Quran of Salih" in Kitāb al-ʿIbar, writing that it contained "surahs" named after prophets such as Adam, Noah, and Moses, as well as after animals such as the rooster, the camel, and the elephant.

==== University of al-Qarawiyyin ====
Fatima al-Fihri founded al-Qarawiyiin University in Fes in 859. Particularly from the beginning of the 12th century, this university played an important role in the development of Moroccan literature, welcoming scholars and writers from throughout the Maghreb, al-Andalus, and the Mediterranean Basin. Among the scholars who studied and taught there were Ibn Khaldoun, Ibn al-Khatib, Al-Bannani, al-Bitruji, Ibn Hirzihim (Sidi Harazim) and Al-Wazzan (Leo Africanus) as well as the Jewish theologian Maimonides and the Catholic Pope Sylvester II. The writings of Sufi leaders played an important role in literary and intellectual life in Morocco from this early period (e.g. Abu-l-Hassan ash-Shadhili and al-Jazouli) until the present (e.g. Muhammad ibn al-Habib).

==== Judeo-Moroccan literature ====
An early example of Judeo-Moroccan literature is the 9th-century Risalah of Judah ibn Kuraish to the Jews of Fes, written in Judeo-Arabic with Hebrew script.

=== Almoravid period ===
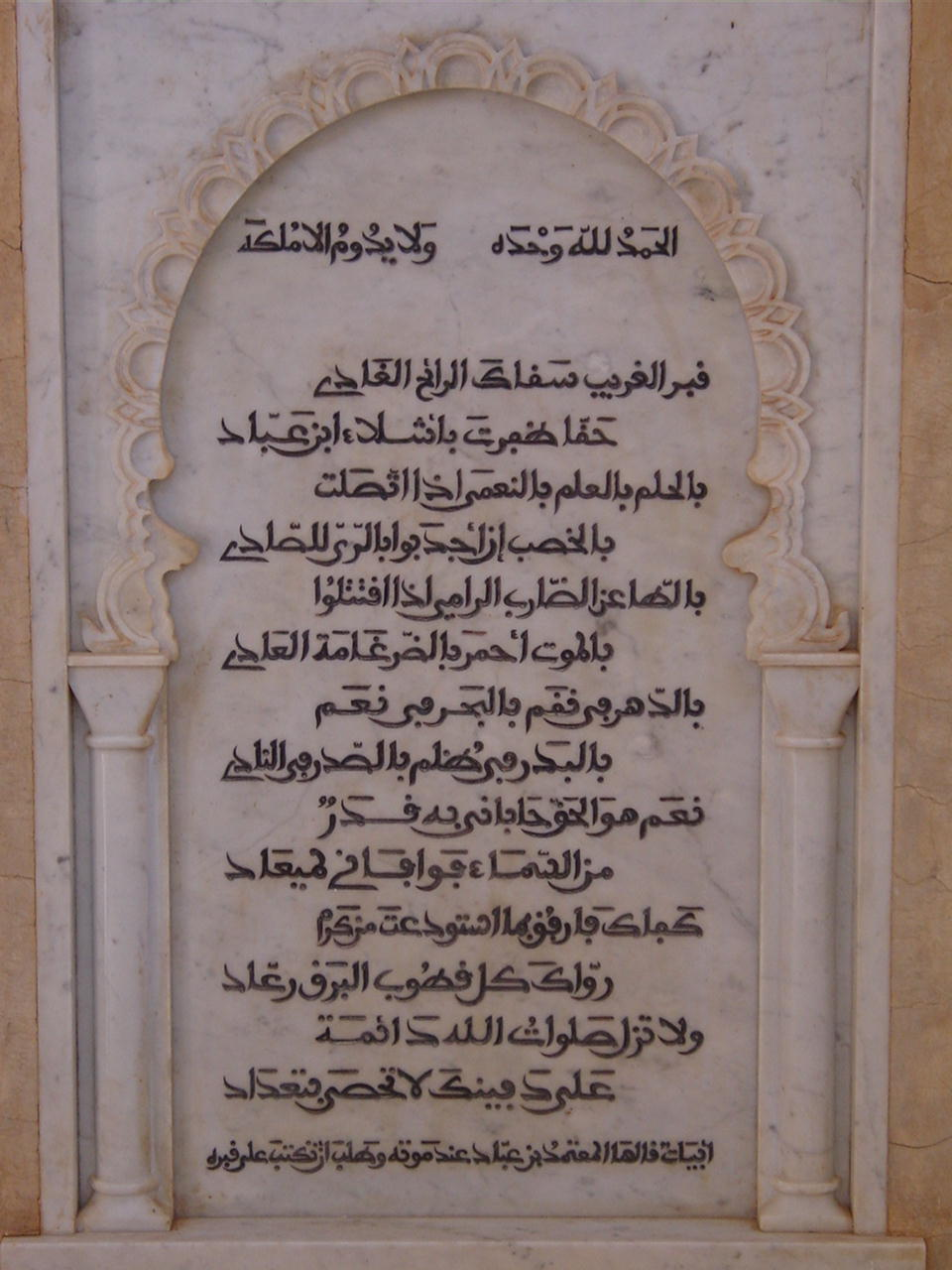
A plaque at the burial place of the Poet King Al-Mu'tamid ibn Abbad, interred 1095 in Aghmat, Morocco.

The cultural interchange between Morocco and al-Andalusi rapidly accelerated with this political unification and Almoravid sultans stimulated culture in their courts and in the country. This process began when Yusuf Bin Tashfin, upon taking control of al-Andalus after the Battle of az-Zallaqah (Sagrajas), and continued with al-Mu'tamid Bin Abbad, poet king of the Taifa of Seville, to Tangier and ultimately Aghmat.

The historian Ibn Hayyan lived the end of his life in the Almoravid empire, as did Al-Bakri, author of Roads and Kingdoms. In the Almoravid period two writers stand out: Ayyad ben Moussa and Ibn Bajja. Ayyad is known for having authored Kitāb al-Shifāʾ bīTaʾrif Ḥuqūq al-Muṣṭafá. The writings of Abu Imran al-Fasi, a Moroccan Maliki scholar, influenced Yahya Ibn Ibrahim and the early Almoravid movement.

==== Zajal ====
Under the Almoravids, Mauro-Andalusi strophic zajal poetry flourished. In his Muqaddimah, Ibn Khaldun discusses the development of zajal in al-Andalus under the Almoravids, mentioning Ibn Quzman, Ibn Zuhr, and others. Although Andalusi zajal was originally composed in the local Arabic of Cordoba, Ibn Khaldun also mentions the importance of zajal in Moroccan cities such as Fes.

==== Muwashah poetry ====
A great number of poets from the Almoravid period in al-Andalus, such as the writers of muwashahat Al-Tutili, Ibn Baqi, Ibn Khafaja and Ibn Sahl, are mentioned in anthological works such as Kharidat al-Qasr (خريدة القصر وجريدة العصر), Ibn Dihya's Al Mutrib (المطرب من أشعار أهل المغرب), and Abū Ṭāhir al-Silafī's Mujam as-Sifr (معجم السفر).

=== Almohad period ===
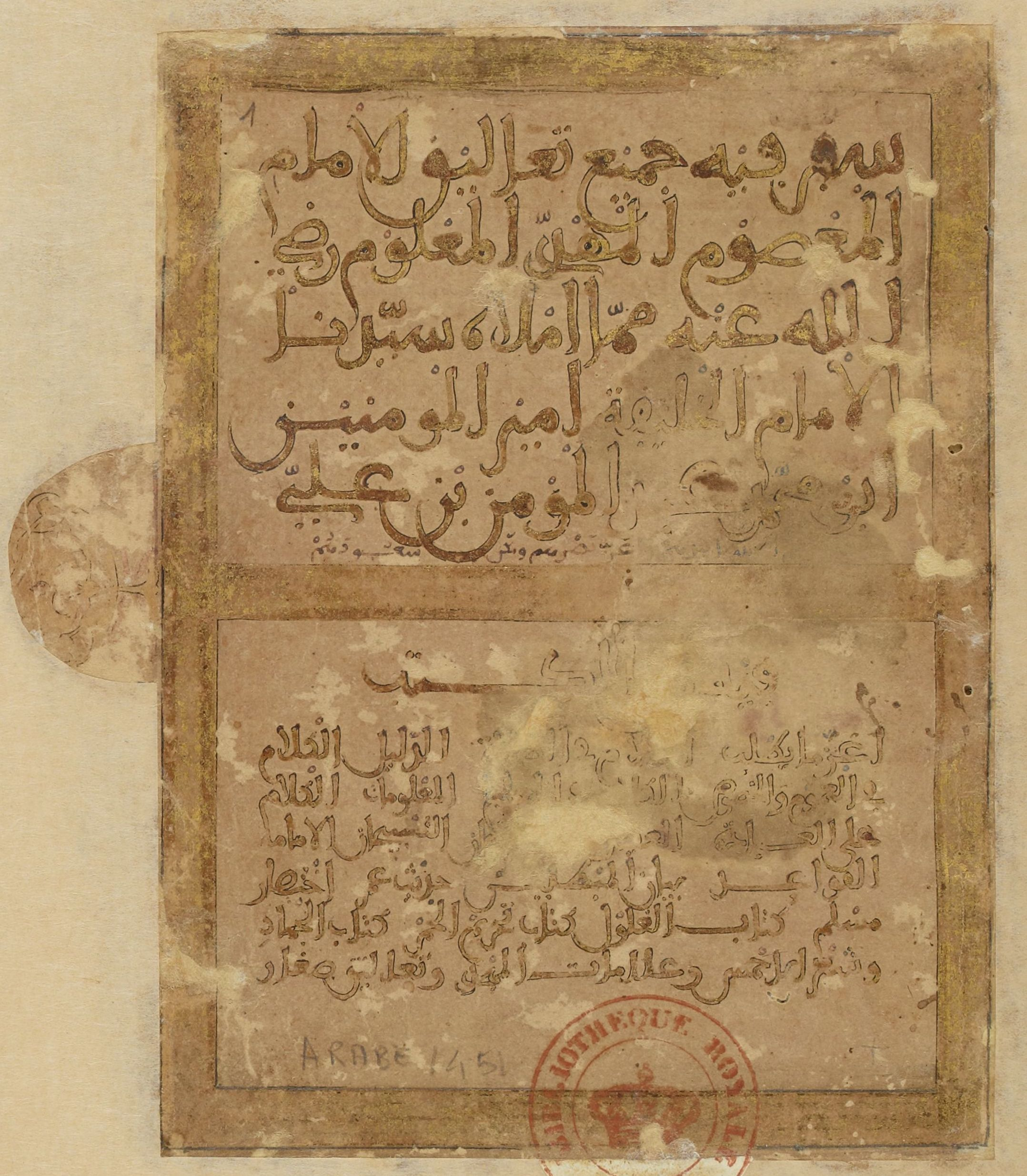
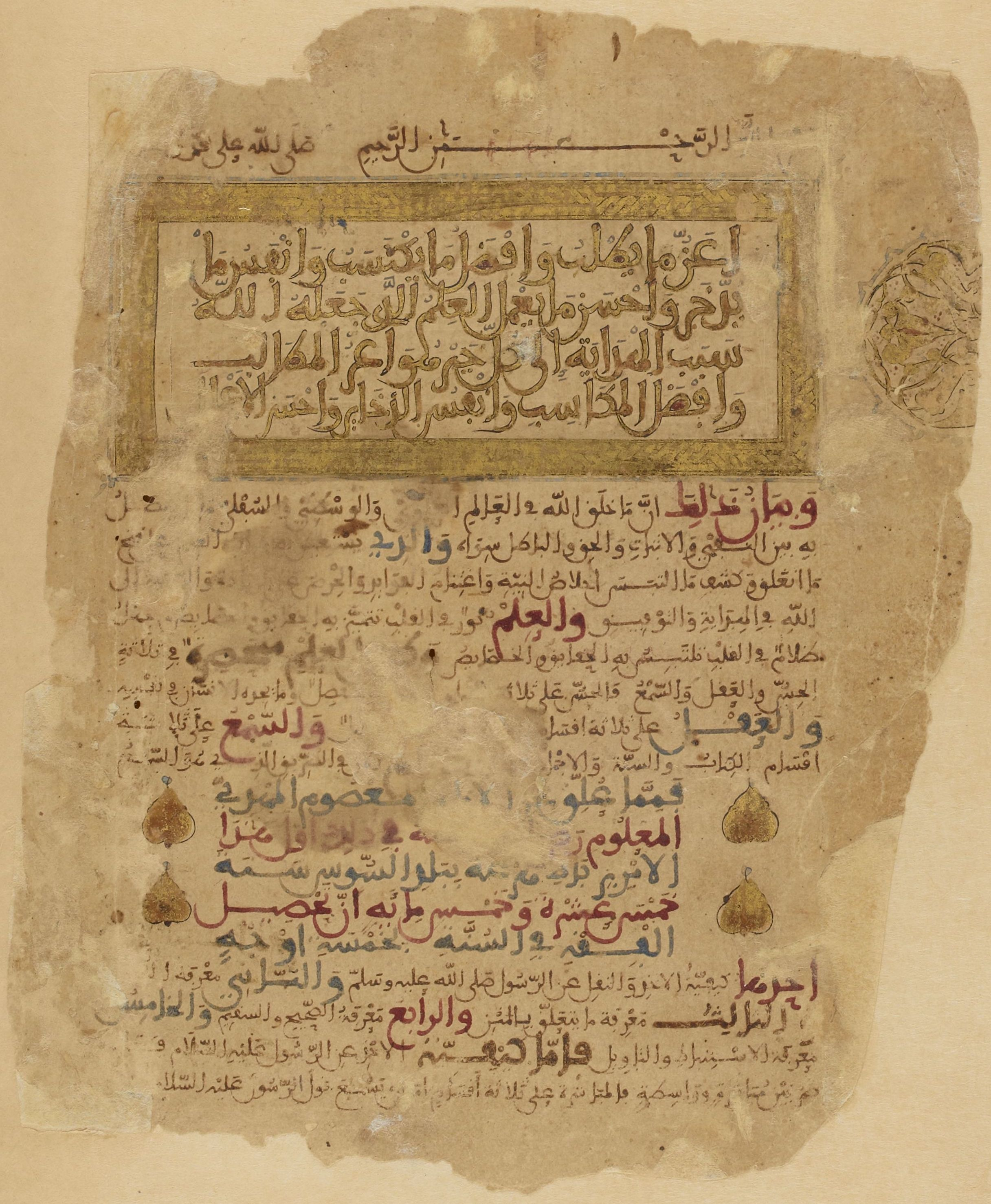
An 1183 manuscript of Ibn Tumart's E'az Ma Yutlab written in a Maghrebi script.

Under the Almohad dynasty (1147–1269) Morocco experienced another period of prosperity and learning. The Imam Ibn Tumart, founding leader of the Almohad movement, authored a book entitled E'az Ma Yutlab (أعز ما يُطلب The Most Noble Calling).

The Almohad rulers built the Koutoubia Mosque in Marrakesh, which accommodated no fewer than 25,000 people, but was also famed for its books, manuscripts, libraries and book shops, which gave it its name. The Almoha] sultan Abu Yaqub Yusuf had a great love for collecting books.^{[pages needed]} He founded a great private library, which was eventually moved to the kasbah of Marrakesh and turned into a public library. Under the Almohads, the sovereigns encouraged the construction of schools and sponsored scholars of every sort. Ibn Rushd (Averroes), Ibn Tufail, Ibn al-Abbar, Ibn Amira and many more poets, philosophers and scholars found sanctuary and served the Almohad rulers. The female poet Hafsa bint al-Hajj al-Rukuniyya settled in at the Almohad court in Marrakesh and taught the sultan's family.

Mohamed Jabroun argued that it was under the Almohads that madrasas first appeared in Morocco, starting under the reign of Abd al-Mu'min, in order to train those who would take roles in the empire's leadership and administration.

In this period, Ibn Arabi established himself in Fes and studied under Mohammed ibn Qasim al-Tamimi, author of An-Najm al-Mushriqa. Abu Ishaq Ibrahim al-Kanemi, an Afro-Arab poet from Kanem, wrote panegyric qasidas in praise of Caliph Yaqub al-Mansur.

==== Judeo-Moroccan literature in the Middle Ages ====
Jewish culture experienced a golden age in the medieval Western Islamic world, particularly in literature. Among the most prominent Jewish writers of this period were Isaac Alfasi, Joseph ben Judah ibn Aknin, and Maimonides, author of The Guide for the Perplexed.

==== Decline of Mauro-Andalusi literature ====
Lisan ad-Din Ibn al-Khatib, considered the "last great man of letters" of the Mauro-Andalusi tradition, spent significant periods of his life exiled in Morocco, and was executed in Fes. Hasan ibn Muhammad al-Wazzan, who would later take the name Leo Africanus and write the Cosmographia et geographia de Affrica, also lived in Morocco after the fall of Granada in 1492, before travelling to Mecca and eventually being captured and taken to the Papal States.

=== Marinid period ===
Abulbaqaa' ar-Rundi, who was from Ronda and died in Ceuta, composed his qasida nuniyya Elegy for al-Andalus in the year 1267; this poem is a rithā', or lament, mourning the fall of most major Andalusi cities to the Catholic monarchs in the wake of the Almohad Caliphate's defeat, and also calling the Marinid Sultanate in Morocco to take up arms in support of Islam in Iberia.

Sultans of the Marinid dynasty (1215–1420) further stimulated learning and literature; Sultan Abu al-Hasan Ali ibn Othman built a madrasa in Salé and Sultan Abu Inan Faris (r. 1349–1358) built madrasas in Meknes and Fes. At his invitation Ibn Batuta, the founder of Moroccan travel literature, returned to settle in the city of Fes and write his Rihla or travelogue Tuḥfat an-Nuẓẓār fī Gharāʾib al-Amṣār wa ʿAjāʾib al-Asfār, in cooperation with Ibn Juzayy. The heritage left by the literature of that time that saw the flowering of Al-Andalus, and the rise of the three Berber dynasties had its impact on Moroccan literature throughout the following centuries.

The first record of a work of literature composed in Moroccan Darija was Al-Kafif az-Zarhuni's al-Mala'ba, written in the period of Sultan Abu al-Hasan Ali ibn Othman. Muhammad al-Jazuli, one of the Seven Saints of Marrakesh, wrote Dala'il al-Khayrat, a Sufi prayer book with a wide impact throughout the Islamic world, in the 15th century.

=== Wattasid period ===
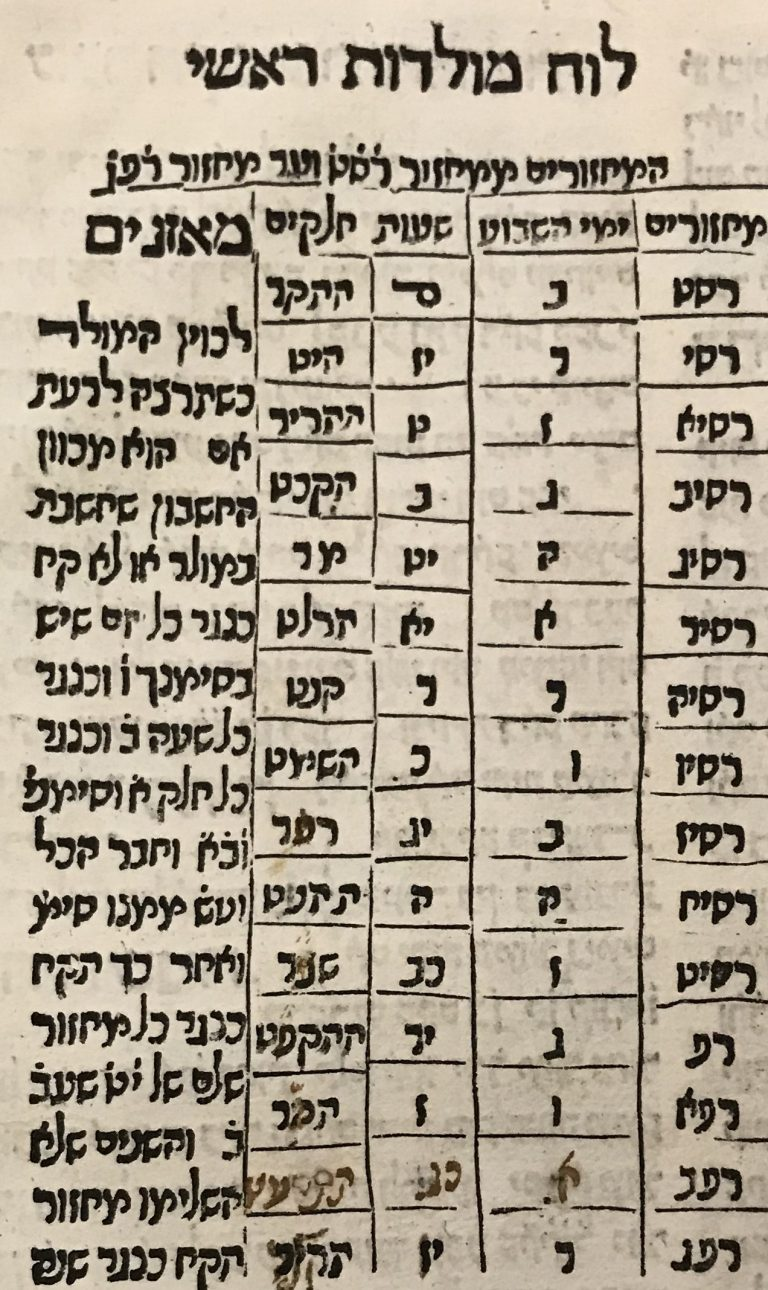
Table from Sefer Abudarham published 1516 in Fes

In 1516, Samuel ibn Ishaq Nedivot and his son Isaac, Andalusi Jewish refugees from Lisbon, produced the first printed book on the African continent, the Sefer Abudarham (ספר אבודרהם) in Fes.

=== Saadi period ===
The possession of manuscripts of famous writers remained the pride of courts and zawiyas throughout the history of Morocco until the modern times. The great Saadian ruler Ahmed al-Mansour (r.1578–1603) was a poet king. Poets of his court were Ahmad Ibn al-Qadi, Abd al-Aziz al-Fishtali. Ahmed Mohammed al-Maqqari lived during the reign of his sons. The Saadi Dynasty contributed greatly to the library of the Taroudannt. Another library established in time that was that of Tamegroute—part of it remains today. By a strange coincidence the complete library of Sultan Zaydan an-Nasser as-Saadi has also been transmitted to us to the present day. Due to circumstances in a civil war, Sultan Zaydan (r.1603–1627) had his complete collection transferred to a ship, which was commandeered by Spain. The collection was taken to El Escorial palace and remains there until the present.

Tarikh as-Sudan, of the Timbuktu Chronicles, was composed by Abd ar-Rahman as-Sa’di, a chronicler from Timbuktu who served Morocco as governor of Djenné and head administrator of the Arma bureaucracy. It is considered the most important primary source document on the Songhai Empire.

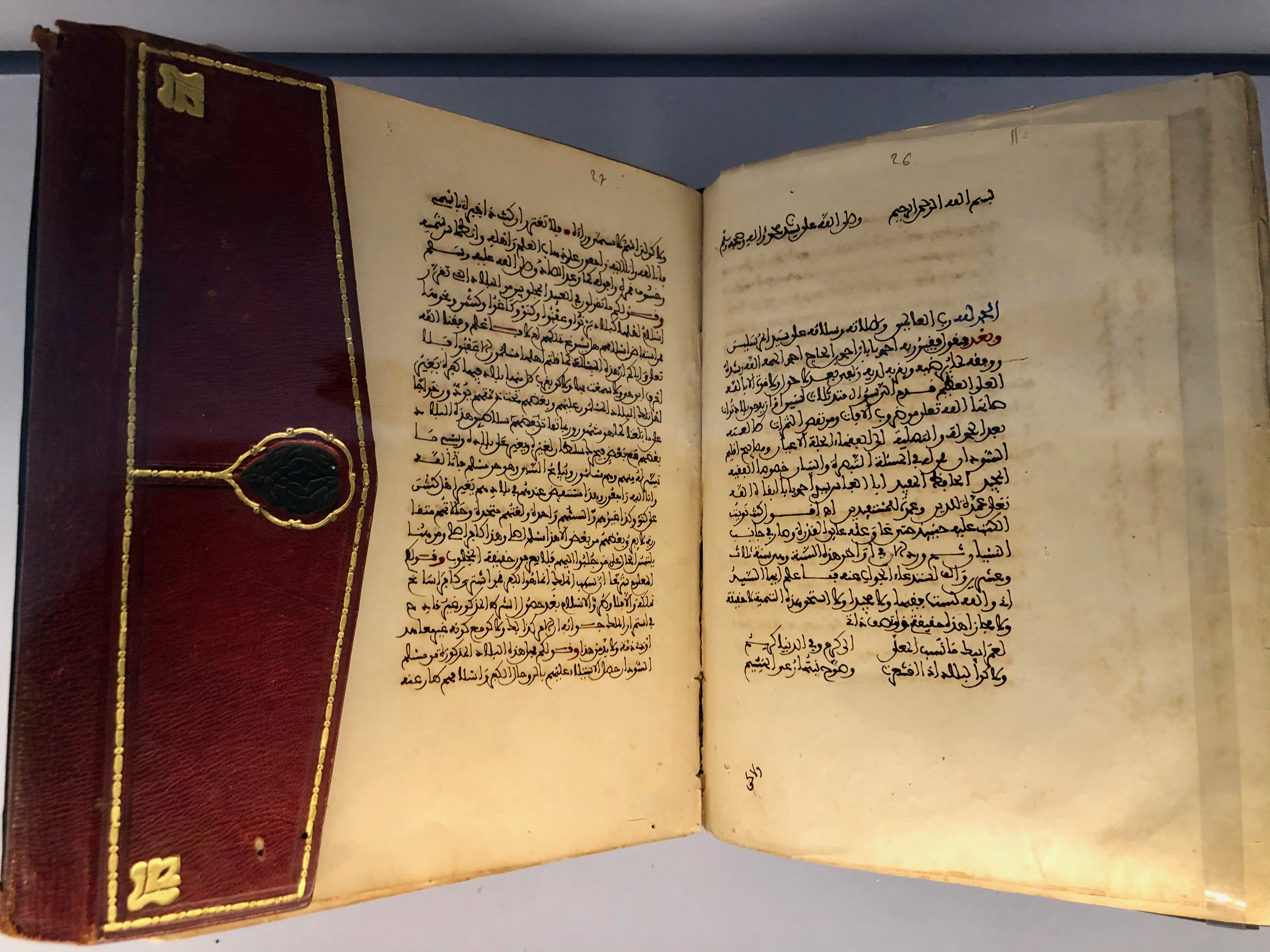
A 19th-century copy of Ahmad Baba at-Timbukti's The Ladder of Ascent in Obtaining the Procurements of the Sudan executed in Maghrebi script.

Ahmad Baba al-Timbukti was among the greatest scholars of Timbuktu when it was conquered by the Saadi Sultanate, and he continued his scholarly activities after being exiled to Fes. In addition to writing prolifically in law, grammar, fiqh, and literature, he wrote The Ladder of Ascent in Obtaining the Procurements of the Sudan, responding to a Moroccan's questions about slavery in the Bilad as-Sudan.

Ahmad ibn Qasim Al-Hajarī known as Afoqai al-Andalusi composed a rihla entitled Riḥlat al-Shihāb ilá liqāʼ al-aḥbāb. Famous Moroccan poets of this period were Abderrahman El Majdoub, Al-Masfiwi, Muhammad Awzal and Hemmou Talb.

=== Alawi period ===
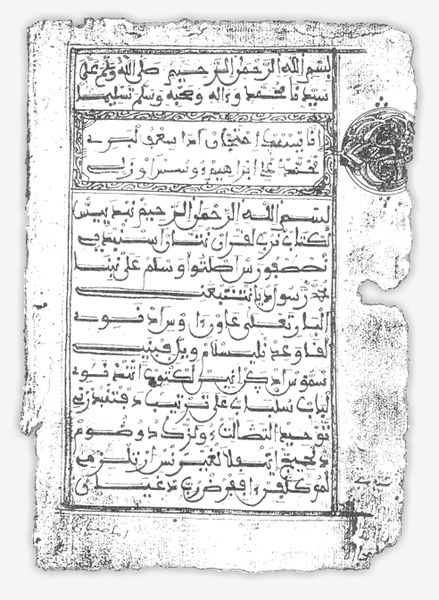
The first page of al-Hawzali's 18th-century manuscript al-Ḥawḍ in Tachelhit written with Maghrebi script.

In 1737, the Shaykh Muhammad al-Mu’ta bin al-Salih al-Sharqi began his work on Dhakhirat al-Muhtaj fi sala ‘ala Sahib al-Liwa wat-taj, an influential Sufi book on prayer, dhikr, and repentance.

Sidi Hammo was the author of "Fadma" and other poems in Tashelhit.

Ahmed at-Tijani, originally from Aïn Madhi in Algeria, lived in Fes, associated with the North African literary elite, and later established the Tijaniyyah Sufi order. The Ulama' of the Tijaniyyah order, with Fes as their spiritual capital, were among the most prolific producers of literature in the Maghreb. Mohammed al-Haik's late 18th-century songbook Kunnash al-Haik is a seminal text of Andalusi music.

In the year 1886, the historian Mohammed Akensus al-Murrakushi authored his magnum opus al-Jaysh al-ʻaramram al-khumāsī fī dawlat awlād Mawlānā ʻAlī al-Sajilmāsī on the reign of Sultan Mohammed ben Abdallah.

The Rabbi of Tetuan Isaac Ben Walid wrote Vayomer Yitzhak (Hebrew: ויאמר יצחק, lit. 'Thus Spoke Isaac') chronicling the history of the Jews of Tetuan, a city considered a capital of Sephardic or Andalusi Jews in Morocco following the fall of al-Andalus.

==== Lithographic press ====
In 1864, Muhammad Ibn at-Tayib ar-Rudani of Taroudant brought to Morocco the country's first Arabic printing press from Egypt upon his return from the Hajj, as well as a servant from Egypt to operate it. This press, called al-Matba'a as-Sa'ida (المطبعة السعيدة lit. 'the felicitous press') used lithography, which was more amenable to the particularities of Arabic script than movable type. Its first publication was an edition of Al-Tirmidhi's ash-Shama'il al-Muhammadiyya in 1871.

In the 1890s, Ahmad ibn Khalid an-Nasiri published the landmark al-Istiqsa, a multivolume history of Morocco with in-text citations including non-Islamic sources. It was the country's first comprehensive national history, covering the period from the Muslim conquest of the Maghreb to the reign of Sultan Abdelaziz.

In the precolonial period, most of what was published dealt with religious topics such as sufism and jurisprudence, as well as travel writing about Europe. A popular work of the period was Muḥammad ibn Jaʿfar al-Kattānī's 1908 Nasihat ahl al-Islam. Another was Al-Mahdi al-Wazzani's al-Mi'yar al-Jadid, which discussed Islamic law and the social reality of his times.

==== Literature in resistance to colonialism ====
The Moroccan literary elite was influenced by the ideas of the Nahda cultural movement in the Mashriq. Jamal ad-Din al-Afghani and Muhammad Abduh's Islamic revolutionary journal Al-Urwah al-Wuthqa circulated in Morocco. Muhammad Bin Abdul-Kabir al-Kattani, a poet, man of letters, and shaykh of the Kattaniyya Sufi order, employed the written word as an instrument of resistance to French presence in Morocco. He supported the newspaper Lissan-ul-Maghreb and published at-Tā'ūn, both of which opposed the colonial French newspaper Es-Saada.

Religious and political leader Mohamed Mustafa Ma al-'Aynayn wrote his Mubṣir al-mutashawwif ʻalá Muntakhab al-Taṣawwuf, and his son Ahmed al-Hiba authored Sirāj aẓ-ẓulam fī mā yanfaʿu al-muʿallim wa'l-mutaʿallim.

== 20th century ==
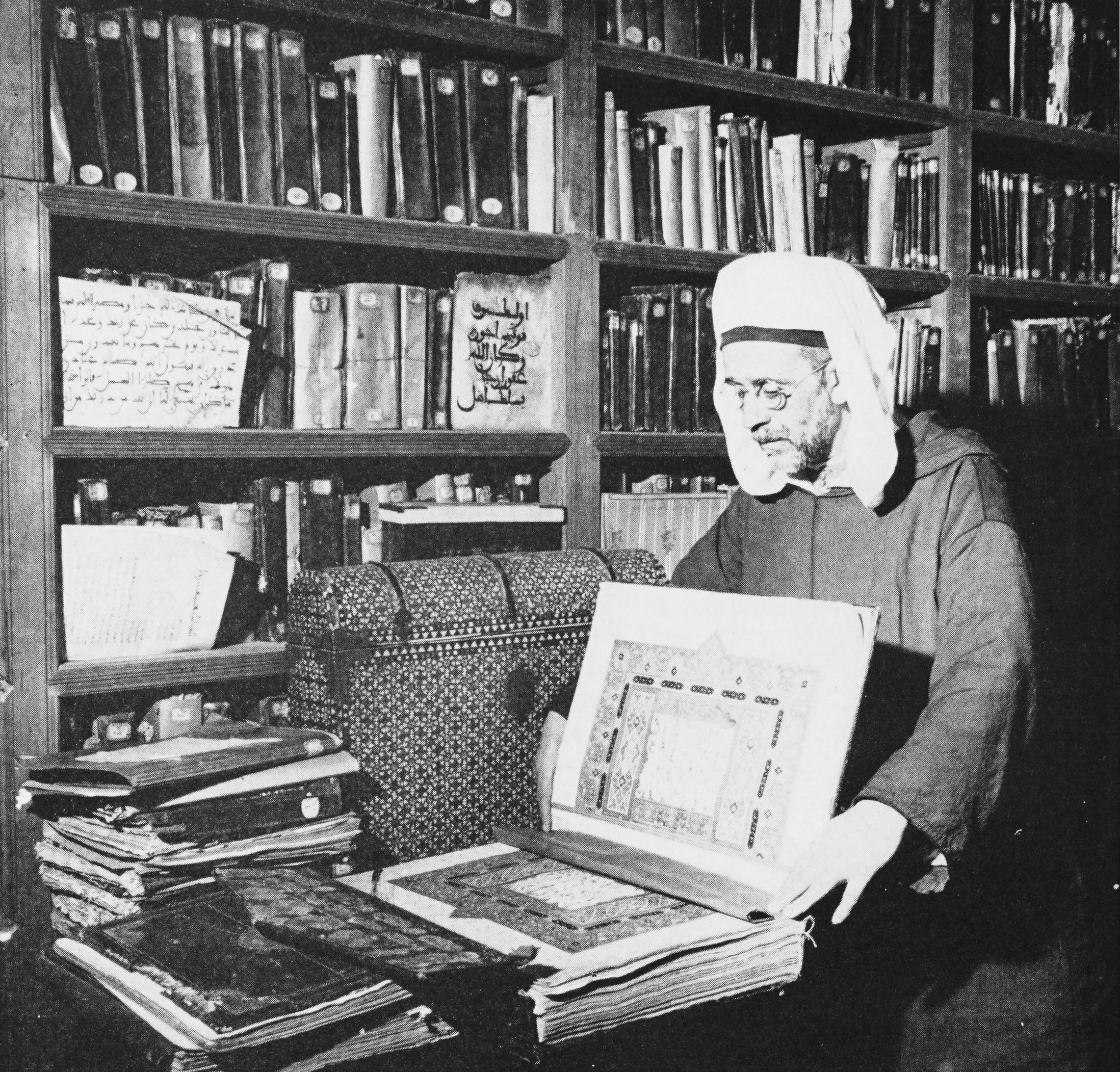
A scholar with manuscripts in the library of al-Qarawiyyin circa 1953.

Three generations of writers especially shaped 20th-century Moroccan literature. During this century, this literature started to reflect the linguistic and cultural diversity of the country by using different languages, such as Modern Standard Arabic, Moroccan Arabic, French, and Berber languages. First was the generation that lived and wrote during the Protectorate (1912–56), and its most important representative was Mohammed Ben Brahim (1897–1955). The second generation became known during the transition to independence, with writers like Abdelkrim Ghallab (1919–2006), Allal al-Fassi (1910–1974) and Mohammed al-Mokhtar Soussi (1900–1963). The third generation are writers of the 1960s. Moroccan literature then flourished with writers such as Mohamed Choukri, Driss Chraïbi, Mohamed Zafzaf and Driss El Khouri. Abdelkebir Khatibi, author of Le roman maghrébin and Maghreb pluriel, was a prominent writer and literary critic writing in French. The philosopher Mohammed Abed al-Jabri is known for his Critique of Arab Reason.

=== Colonial period ===
The Moroccan literary scene in the early 20th century was marked by exposure to literature from the wider Arab world and Europe, while also suffering from colonial censorship. Abdellah Guennoun authored an-Nubūgh al-Maghribī fī al-adab al-ʻArabī on the history of Moroccan literature in three volumes that was censored by the French authorities. During this period, a great number of manuscripts were taken from Morocco or disappeared.

=== Moroccan novel ===
Critics differ on when the Moroccan novel first emerged, due to the variety of novel-like texts that appeared in Morocco between 1924, the year of Ibn al-Muwaqqit's ar-Rihla al-Murrakeshiya (الرحلة المراكشية The Marrakesh Journey), and 1967, the year of Mohammed Aziz Lahbabi's Jīl adh-Dhama' (جيل الظمأ Generation of Thirst). Some^{[who?]} identify the beginning as Abdelmajid Benjelloun's Fi at-Tufula (في الطفولة In Childhood) in 1957, while others point to Tuhami al-Wazzani's az-Zawiyya (الزاوية The Zawiya) in 1942. The Moroccan novel in this foundational period conformed with traditional features of early 20th-century Arabic novels: a third-person omniscient narrator, a linear narrative and storyline, direct preaching and lesson-giving, and the author's own explanation of events and commentary on them. Abdelkader Chatt's Mosaïques ternies, written in 1930 and first published in 1932, is considered the first francophone Moroccan novel.

=== Literary production from the 1960s to 1990s ===
After Moroccan independence, a number of writers of Moroccan origin have become well-known abroad, including Tahar Ben Jelloun and others in France or Laila Lalami in the United States.

In 1966, a group of Moroccan writers such as Abdellatif Laabi founded a magazine called Souffles-Anfas (أنفاس "Breaths") that was banned by the government in 1972, but gave impetus to the poetry and modern fiction of many Moroccan writers. Female authors also emerged such as Malika el Assimi, who promoted not only the cultural traditions of her country, but also women's rights.

Moroccan works of fiction and non-fiction about the "Years of Lead" include Fatna El Bouih’s Talk of Darkness, Malika Oufkir and Michèle Fitoussi’s Stolen Lives: Twenty Years in a Desert Jail, Mohamed Raiss’s From Skhirat to Tazmamart: A Roundtrip Ticket to Hell, Ahmed Marzouki’s Tazmamart: Cell Number 10, Aziz Binebine’s Tazmamart – Eighteen Years in Morocco’s Secret Prison and Khadija Marouazi's History of Ash.

=== English expatriate literature from Tangier ===
The city of Tangier, administered internationally during the colonial period, became a literary and artistic hub mainly for expatriate writers from the United States. Some Moroccans such as Mohamed Choukri, author of For Bread Alone, and Mohamed Mrabet were also active in Tangier. The Americans Paul Bowles and William S. Burroughs spent considerable time in Tangier, and other writers associated with the Beat Generation passed through, including Tennessee Williams, Brion Gysin, Allen Ginsberg and Jack Kerouac. The international literary scene in Tangier also produced translations of works by Moroccans: Paul Bowles edited and translated work by Choukri, Mrabet, Abdeslam Boulaich, Driss Ben Hamed Charhadi, and Ahmed Yacoubi.

== Literary publishers ==
Since independence, Moroccan publishers have contributed to Moroccan literature by publishing and promoting works in French and Arabic, as well as later in Standard Moroccan Amazigh. Among others, Layla Chaouni, who founded her publishing company Éditions Le Fennec in 1987, has become a leading publisher in Morocco. With more than 500 titles of Moroccan fiction and non-fiction in French and Arabic, she has also been supporting Human and Women's Rights.

Nadia Essalmi, founder of the Yomad publishing house, is known for her contributions to the promotion of Moroccan stories for young adults and children. Since their beginnings in 1998, Yomad have published about 100 books for children and young readers in French, Arabic and the official Berber language Tamazight at affordable prices.

Even though international book fairs have been held in Tangiers and Casablanca for years, publishers such as Abdelkader Retnani (La Croisée des Chemins), Rachid Chraïbi (Editions Marsam) und Layla Chaouni have criticized insufficient support by the government. Moroccan literature has been supported by few subsidies, many bookshops have been closed and there is a lack of reliable statistics about the book market. - Despite the fact that several former Ministers of Culture, such as Mohammed Achaari and Bensalem Himmich, themselves have been writers.

=== Statistics ===
Publishing in Morocco expanded during the late 2010s, with literary works forming a significant part of the sector. In 2016, Moroccan publishers released 710 creative works, including 429 novels, 366 history books, 283 literary studies, and 271 works in Islamic studies. Literature accounted for approximately 26% of Morocco’s publishing sector.

Data on fiction publishing show that 238 novels were published in 2016 (including 159 in Arabic, 9 in Amazigh, 68 in French, and 2 in other languages), compared with 205 in 2017 (142 Arabic, 5 Amazigh, 58 French) and 254 in 2018 (180 Arabic, 10 Amazigh, 62 French, 2 other languages). Short-story collections totaled 152 in 2016 (116 Arabic, 19 Amazigh, 15 French, 2 other languages), 121 in 2017 (94 Arabic, 10 Amazigh, 16 French, 1 other language), and 110 in 2018 (81 Arabic, 12 Amazigh, 16 French, 1 other language). Poetry collections numbered 285 in 2016 (234 Arabic, 28 Amazigh, 18 French, 5 other languages), 292 in 2017 (233 Arabic, 15 Amazigh, 41 French, 3 other languages), and 264 in 2018 (206 Arabic, 17 Amazigh, 40 French, 1 other language). Language distribution data for 2018 indicate 2,875 Arabic titles (2,436 printed and 439 digital, representing 78.18% of publications), 675 French titles (420 printed and 255 digital, 18.35%), 68 English titles (18 printed and 50 digital, 1.85%), 45 Amazigh titles (1.22%), 12 Spanish titles (0.36%), and 1 title each in Portuguese and German (0.02% each).

Overall book production increased during the period, rising from 2,448 books in 2015 to 2,807 in 2016, 3,833 in 2017, 6,000 in 2018, and 4,219 in 2019. The number of magazines also grew from 320 in 2015 to 376 in 2016, 380 in 2017, 380 in 2018, and 430 in 2019.

== See also ==
- List of Moroccan writers
- Culture of Morocco
- Music of Morocco
- Pallache family (rabbinical writings)
- Modern Arabic literature
