= Khutba of Tariq Ibn Ziyad =

8th-century Islamic sermon

A khutba of dubious authenticity is attributed to Ṭāriq ibn Ziyād at the beginning of the Muslim conquest of the Iberian Peninsula, upon the landing of Muslim troops coming from Africa on European shores.

== Transmission ==
The text of the speech and its historical context appear in the 1274 work Wafayāt al-ʾAʿyān [Deaths of Eminent Men] by Ibn Khallikan (1211–1282). It also appeared in Nafh at-Tib of the 16th-century historian Ahmed Mohammed al-Maqqari. (Note: Nafḥ al-ṭīb min ghuṣn al-Andalus al-raṭīb wa-dhikr waziriha Lisān al-Dīn ibn al-Khaṭīb (نفح الطيب من غصن الأندلس الرطيب وذكر وزيرها لسان الدين بن الخطيب 'The Breath of Perfume from the Dew-Laden Branch of al-Andalus and Mentions of its Vizier Lisan ad-Din Ibn al-Khatib'))

== Content ==
The main thrust of the speech is the exhortation to fight, and it contains both persuasive and coercive language. The opening lines have become well known and have contributed to the piece's fame:

أيها الناس أين المفر البحر من ورائكم والعدو أمامكم وليس لكم والله إلا الصدق والصبر [People! Where is there to escape? The sea is behind you and the enemy in front of you, and by God, there is nothing for you now but courage and endurance.]

== Analysis ==
In her analysis of the text as an example of Arabic battle oration, Tahera Qutbuddin places it in a category of speeches that employ the argument of the desperation of the troops' current moment as a rhetorical strategy, a category that also includes the speeches of Asim ibn Amr al-Tamimi in the Battle of al-Qadisiyyah and Abu Sufyan ibn Harb in the Battle of the Yarmuk. The speech also differs from the orations of Ali, which focus on piousness and righteousness, in that the speech attributed to Ṭāriq ibn Ziyād "enumerates worldly rewards." The speech also enjoins the troops to target the Visigothic King.

== Reception ==
The supposed speech figures prominently in early works of Moroccan literary history, which emphasized the relationship of Morocco and al-Andalus. Abdellah Guennoun, in his 1937 anthology an-Nubūgh al-Maghribī fī al-Adab al-'Arabī, cited this speech as the origin of the Arabic literary tradition in al-Maghrib al-Aqsa and wrote in response to Mashriqi scholars critical of the authenticity of the speech: "Ṭāriq Ibn Ziyād, even if of Berber origin, was brought up in the atmosphere of Arabness and Islam." Mohamed El Fassi described it as "the oldest Moroccan literary text" in his 1940 essay "La littérature marocaine." According to Gonzalo Fernández Parrilla and Eric Calderwood, citing Tariq ibn Ziyad's speech as the origin of Moroccan literature is a "rhetorical strategy" employed in "the effort to interweave Moroccan literature with the history of al-Andalus."

== In popular culture ==
The Palestinian poet Harun Hashim Rashid from Gaza referred to the speech in his 1968 poem "La Mafarr" (لا مَفَرّ 'no escape' or 'nowhere to flee').

The 1994 Hollywood film True Lies, in its portrayal of Arab/Muslim terrorists, features a character giving a speech in Arabic before setting a bomb to destroy the US. The first two lines of it are from the speech attributed to Ṭāriq ibn Ziyād.
