= An-Nubūgh al-Maghribī fī al-Adab al-'Arabī =

an-Nubūgh al-Maghribī fī al-adab al-ʻArabī
- Author: Abdellah Guennoun
- Original title: النبوغ المغربي في الأدب العربي
- Published: 1937 (al-Matba'a al-Mehdia)

An-Nubūgh al-Maghribī fī al-adab al-ʻArabī (Arabic: النبوغ المغربي في الأدب العربي ‘Moroccan Ingenuity in Arab Literature’) is an anthology of Moroccan literature compiled by the Moroccan scholar Abdellah Guennoun and published in three volumes in 1937. It has been considered the first literary history of Morocco.

This anthology indexed and contextualized major works of literature from al-Maghrib al-Aqṣā and al-Andalus written in Arabic, and led to the development of a Moroccan literary canon. Affirming both Morocco's contributions to Arabic literature and the long tradition of Arabic literature in Morocco, an-Nubūgh al-Maghribī was seen as a nationalist reaction to colonialism.

== Contents ==
=== Volume I: Study ===
==== Introduction ====
Abdellah Guennoun introduces the book as an endeavor to trace the course of intellectual life in al-Maghrib al-Aqsa, the far west, over the centuries from the conquest of Al-Andalus in 711 led by Tariq ibn Ziyad. He writes:

هذا كتابٌ جمعنا فيه بين العلم والأدب والتاريخ والسياسة ورميْنا بذلك إلى تصوير الحياة الفكرية لوطننا المغرب وتطورها في العصور المختلفة من لدن قدوم الفاتح الأول إلى قريب من وقتنا هذا؛ فالحركة العلمية وما طرأ عليها من نشاط وفتور، في جميع العصور، مبسوطة فيه أحسن البسط. والسياسة واتجاهاتها التي كانت تتخذها بحسب طبيعة كل دولة مفصلة فيه تفصيلا ً مستوفى This is a book in which we have collected from knowledge, literature, history, and politics, with the objective of imagining the intellectual life in our homeland al-Maghrib (Morocco) and its development over the various periods, from the first of the Muslim conquests until close to our time. The intellectual trends, through periods of activity and lull, through all the eras, is explained thoroughly, and politics and the directions they took according to the nature of each state are explored in detail.

Guennoun describes the neglect and disregard with which the Mashriq, the Arab East, tended to regard the literature of al-Maghrib al-Aqsa, the far west as his motivation for the project. He argued for the inclusion of Maghrebi literature in the wider Arabic literary tradition, though explicitly not asserting, in the words of Gretchen Head, "the existence of a national literary canon detached from its broader heritage." Head also notes the use of the phrase waṭanina al-Maghrib ('our homeland Morocco') and places the work within a trend of textual production by intellectuals associated with the Moroccan Nationalist Movement.

==== Study ====
The section is then divided into the periods according to ruling dynasty: ʿaṣr al-futūḥ (Idrissid, lit. 'era of Islamic conquest'), ʿaṣr al-murābiṭīn (Almoravid), ʿaṣr al-muwaḥḥidīn (Almohad), ʿaṣr al-Mariniyīn (Marinid), ʿaṣr as-Saʿadiyīn (Saadi), and ʿaṣr al-ʿAlawiyīn (ʿAlawi).

=== Volume II: Prose ===
The second volume contains excerpts of prose.

=== Volume III: Poetry ===
The third volume contains excerpts of poetry.

== Publication ==
The anthology was first published in Mohammed Daoud's al-Matba'a al-Mehdia in Tétouan in 1937.

== Censorship ==
It was banned by the authorities of the French Protectorate, and could not be brought into the area under French colonial control, nor could it be sold, displayed, or distributed there. Spain, however, was receptive of the work; an-Nubūgh al-Maghribī was translated into Spanish and Abdallah Guennoun was granted an honorary doctorate from a university in Madrid.

== Reception and critique ==
Despite its censorship by French colonial authorities, an-Nubūgh al-Maghribī circulated widely in nationalist circles and was celebrated by nationalist figures such as Allal al-Fassi, who wrote a letter of congratulation to Guennoun in 1946. In this letter he wrote:

وقد سد فراغا ًكانت مكتبتنا العصرية في أمس الحاجات إليه، وقام بواجب كان كلنا في تقاعس عنه، وأعطى للناشئة المغربية بيانا عن نبوغ أسلافها، يدفعها للطموح ويهيب بها للعمل، وفتح بابا للمقتدرين من إخواننا على مواصلة ما بدأتم وإكمال ما أسستم.
[It closed a gap that our modern library was in dire need of closing, and it addressed a task that all of us had been neglecting, and it gave the Moroccan youth a sign of the brilliance of their forebears. It inspires them to ambition and emboldens them to act, and it has opened a door for the most capable of our brothers to continue the work you have started and complete that for which you have set the foundation.]

According to Calderwood and Parrilla, this letter attests to how the work "performed one of the primary functions of nationalism—namely, to endow the nation with a glorious past, one that legitimates the claims of the present and undergirds the projects of the future." As such, they argue, the book is emblematic of the moment in Moroccan cultural history when the nationalist movement was seeking to legitimize itself by linking itself to the wider Arab and Muslim worlds.

A letter of appreciation for the work from the German orientalist Carl Brockelmann also appeared in later editions of the anthology.

Gonzalo Fernández Parrilla and Eric Calderwood, writing in 2021, note that the organization in an-Nubūgh al-Maghribī of Moroccan literature under the banners of Islam and Arabness led to striking omissions. They ask:

Where do texts in languages other than Arabic fit into the history of Moroccan literature? And what can we do now with Kannūn’s concept of the waṭan (“homeland”) at a moment when Moroccan literature has become increasingly diasporic?

== Editions ==
- al-Matba'a al-Mehdia Tetuan (1937)
- Dar al-Kitab al-Lubnani, Beirut (1961)
- Dar al-Kutub al-Ilmiyah, Beirut (2014)
