= Gonzalo Fernández =

Gonzalo Fernández may refer to:

- Gonzalo Fernández of Castile, Count of Burgos (ca. 899–915) and of Castile (c. 909–915)
- Gonzalo Fernández de Traba (died 1160), Galician nobleman
- Gonzalo Fernández de Córdoba (1453–1515), known as el Gran Capitán, Castilian general and statesman
- Gonzalo Fernández de Córdoba (1585–1635), Spanish military leader
- Gonzalo Fernández de Córdoba (1520–1578), 3rd duke of Sessa
- Gonzalo Fernández de Oviedo y Valdés (1478–1557), Castilian writer and historian
- Gonzalo Fernández de Córdoba (1585–1635), Spanish military leader
- Gonzalo Fernández (Uruguayan politician) (born 1952), Foreign Minister of Uruguay 2008–2009
- Gonzalo Fernández de la Mora (1924–2002), Spanish essayist and politician
- Gonzalo Fernández-Castaño (born 1980), Spanish golfer
- Gonzalo Fernández Parrilla, Spanish scholar and translator of Arabic literature
