= The Woman and the Rose =

1972 novel by Mohamed Zafzaf

- Author: Mohammed Zafzaf
- Language: Arabic
- Genre: Novel
- Publication date: 1972
- Publication place: Morocco
- Pages: 156

The Woman and the Rose (Arabic: المرأة و الوردة) is a 1972 novel by Mohamed Zafzaf, which critics have described as a turning point in the development of the modern Moroccan Arabic novel.

== Plot ==
The novel centers around Muhammad, an educated Moroccan in his thirties living in Torremolinos, Spain. Impoverished, adrift, and alienated, Muhammad lives off of the European women he sleeps with. Two friends, also Moroccan emigrants, involve him in a scheme to smuggle cannabis from Tangier. After Muhammad's mistakes undermine the plan, his friends abandon him in Morocco, where the novel concludes.

== Themes ==
The style of The Woman and the Rose is disorganized and labyrinthine, departing from the previous conventions of Moroccan literature in its use of multiple narrators and reliance on symbolic and aesthetic imagery. By departing from the style of "nationalist realism" established by Abdelkrim Ghallab and pervasive in Moroccan literature, Zafzaf established a new form for the Moroccan novel. Zafzaf's stylistic innovations respond to the literary critiques of figures such as Abdallah Laroui, Abdelkebir Khatibi, and Mohammed Berrada, while also allowing him to level subtle criticisms at the social structures of postcolonial Morocco.

Zafzaf's earthy, realistic depictions of human bodies, physical pleasures, sex, and drugs have drawn criticism from some Moroccan critics, who have described the book as "bestial" and "obscene". Other critics have praised his "frenzied affirmation of the body", a theme which sparked a new trend in Moroccan literature. Other controversial themes in The Woman and the Rose include the concepts of gender, self, identity, and otherness.
