= Abdellah Guennoun =

Moroccan writer, historian and faqīh

- عبد الله گنون
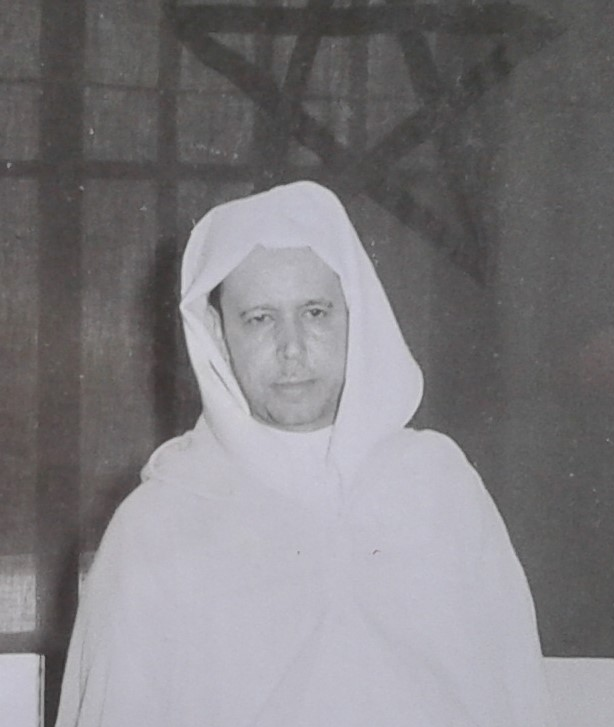
- Born: September 16, 1908
- Died: July 9, 1989 (aged 80)

Abdellah Guennoun (Arabic: عبد الله ڭنون ʻAbd Allāh Gannūn; 16 September 1908 – 9 July 1989) was an influential Moroccan writer, essayist, poet, academic, administrator, journalist, and faqīh who was born in Fes and died in Tangier. He was one of the leaders of the Nahda movement in Morocco, and served as the general secretary of the League of Moroccan Religious Scholars (رابطة علماء المغرب).

He is known for writing an-Nubūgh al-Maghribī fī al-adab al-ʻArabī (النبوغ المغربي في الأدب العربي, Moroccan Intellect in Arabic Literature), a three-volume anthology of Moroccan literature in Arabic that was banned by the French Protectorate.

Guennoun also served as a member of a number of linguistic, educational, and Islamic academies and organizations in places such as Rabat, Cairo, Damascus, Baghdad, and Amman.

== Early life ==
Abdallah Guennoun was born in Fes in 1908 to a family of noble Idrissid lineage long associated with knowledge. His family moved from Fes to Tangier in 1914.

He had a traditional Islamic education, memorizing the Quran and some Hadith. With access to international books in Tangier, he also taught himself Spanish and French.

== Career ==
Guennoun began his writing career early; he published in the newspaper Idhar al-Haqq (إظهار الحق) in 1927 when he was 20 years old. He also wrote for publications such as the Egyptian literary magazine Arrissalah.

He became active and influential in the flourishing intellectual and cultural scene in Tetuan, and he published many of his works there. As part of this intellectual circle in Tetuan, he was involved in the first nationalist publication in Morocco, as-Salaam, which published its first issue October 1933.

Guennoun was well-connected, associated with Said Hajji in the French area, Mohammed Daoud in the Spanish area, and Shakib Arslan in the Mashriq. Guennoun became involved with the Moroccan Action Committee in 1934.

He opened the first of the Moroccan free schools in Tangier, the Free Abdallah Guennoun School (مدرسة عبد الله كنون الحرة), and worked as a teacher in 1936.

He was the editor in-chief of a monthly Islamic publication called Lisaan ad-Din (لسان الدين) in the 1940s and published a number of articles. He also served as the general secretary of al-Mithaq, a journal put out by the faculty of al-Qarawiyyin University.

He refused the support Mohammed Ben Aarafa, the puppet monarch chosen by France to replace Muhammad V, whom France had exiled.

Guennoun was, among other members of the Mococcan Nationalist Movement (الحركة الوطنية المغربية) including Allal al-Fassi, Abdelkhalek Torres, Abdallah Ibrahim, a member of a generation of Moroccan intellectuals brought together the political and the cultural, and who criticized the reform movement in the country, arguing that there can be "no reform without independence."

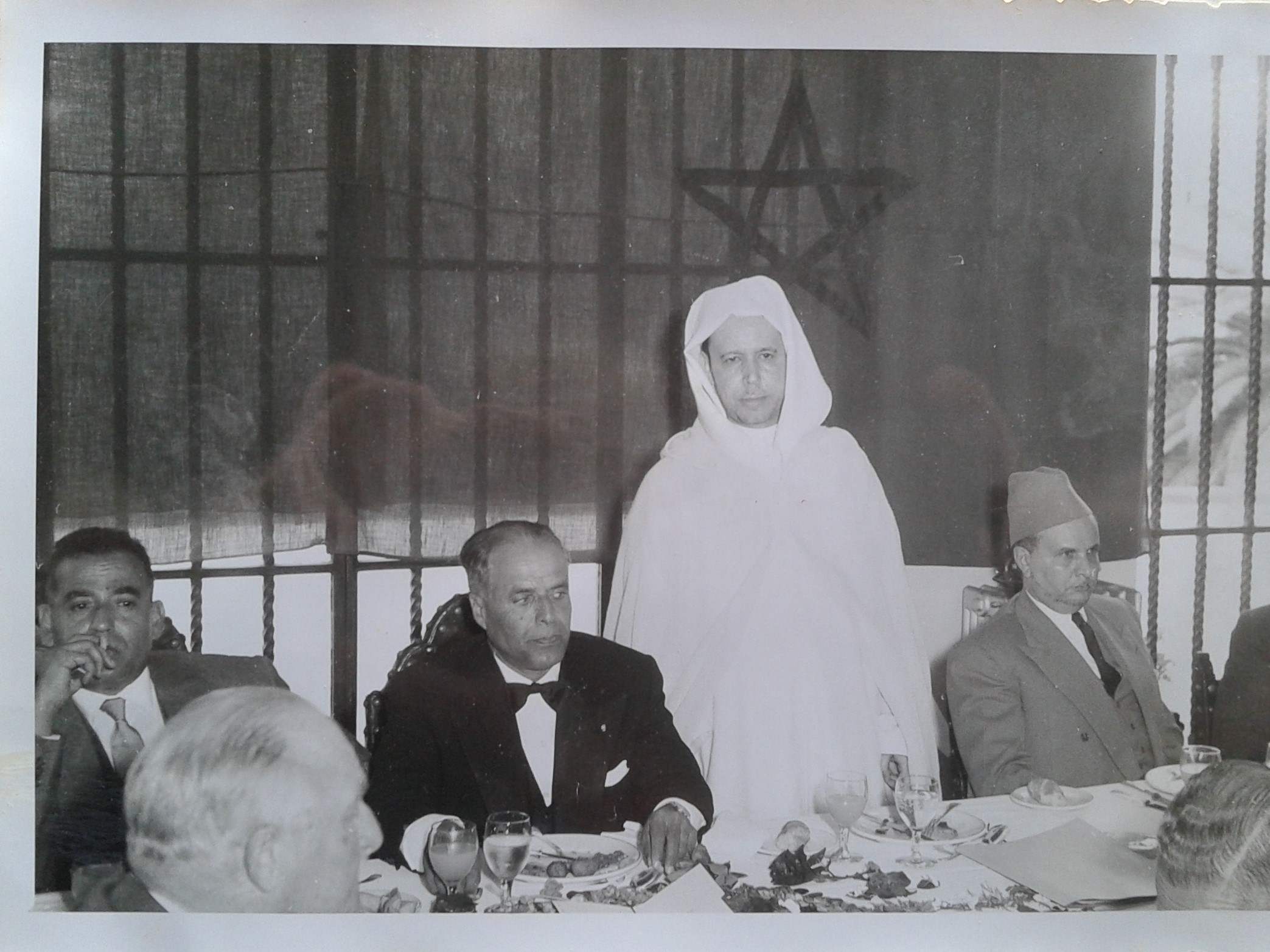
Guennoun (standing) during a banquet in Tangier, April 1957, next to Habib Bourguiba (with bow tie) and Allal al-Fassi (with fez)

Abdellah Guennoun taught Ahmed Boukmakh and later assisted him in the creation of Iqra' (اِقْرَأ, "Read"), the first series of Arabic textbooks for children in Morocco, published in 1956, 1957, and 1958.

== an-Nubūgh al-Maghribī ==
In 1937, he published an-Nubūgh al-Maghribī fī al-adab al-ʻArabī (النبوغ المغربي في الأدب العربي, Moroccan Intellect in Arabic Literature), his three-volume anthology of Moroccan literature. This anthology indexed and contextualized major Moroccan works of literature written in Arabic, and led to the development of a Moroccan literary canon. Affirming both Morocco's contributions to Arabic literature and the long tradition of Arabic literature in Morocco, an-Nubūgh al-Maghribī was seen as a nationalist reaction to colonialism. It was banned by the authorities of the French Protectorate, and could not be brought into the area under French colonial control, nor could it be sold, displayed, or distributed there. Spain, however, was receptive of the work; an-Nubūgh al-Maghribī was translated into Spanish and Abdallah Guennoun was granted an honorary doctorate from a university in Madrid.

He held a number of different positions. In 1937, he was made director of the Khalifi Institute (المعهد الخليفي), then professor at the High Institute of Religion (Arabic: المعهد الديني العالي) and the College of Theology in Tetuan (كلية أصول الدين بتطوان). He held the office of Minister of Justice in the Khalifi government from 1954 to 1956.

He became a member of the Arab Academy of Damascus in 1956, the Academy of the Arabic Language in Cairo in 1961, the League of Moroccan Religious Scholars, the al-Quds Scientific Commission (هيئة القدس العلمية) in 1973, the Muslim World League in Mecca as a founding member in 1974, the Jordan Academy of Arabic in 1978, the Iraqi Academy of Sciences in 1979, and the Academy of the Kingdom of Morocco in 1980.

In 1981, he founded al-Ihyaa' (الإحياء The Revival), a journal published by the Association of Moroccan Academics focusing on Islamic theological sciences and thought from an open, critical perspective.

== Death ==
Abdallah Guennoun died on 9 July 1989, aged 80, in Tangier.

== Notable works ==
Abdallah Guennoun's works include poetry, literary fiction, and history. Some of his most notable works include:

- an-Nubūgh al-Maghribī fī al-adab al-ʻArabī (النبوغ المغربي في الأدب العربي, Moroccan Intellect in Arabic Literature), 1st ed. al-Matba'a al-Mehdia. 1937; 2nd ed. Dar al-Kitab al-Lubnani. 1961; 1st ed. Dar al-Kutub al-Ilmiyah. 2014.
- Umarāʼunā al-Shuʻarāʼ (أمراؤنا الشعراء Our Poet Princes). 1941.
- al-Qudwat ul-Samiya lil-Nashi'at il-Islamiya (القدوة السامية للناشئة الإسلامية). 1945
- Wahat al-Fikr (واحة الفكر The Oasis of Thought). 1948.
- Dīwān Malik Gharnaṭah Yusuf al-Thalith (ديوان مالك غرناطة يوسف الثالث The Poetry of Yusuf III, King of Granada). 1958.
- Aḥādīth ʻan al-Adab al-Maghribī al-Ḥadīth (أحاديث عن الأدب المغربي الحديث On Modern Moroccan Literature). 1964.
- Mafāhīm Islāmīyah (مفاهيم إسلامية Islamic Concepts). 1964.
- al-Muntakhab min Shiʻr Ibn Zākūr (المنتخب من شعر ابن زاكور A Selection of the Poetry of Ibn Zakur). 1966.
- Luqmān al-Ḥakīm (لقمان الحكيم Luqman the Wise). 1969.
- Adab al-Fuqahāʼ (أدب الفقهاء Literature of the Theologians). 1970.
- Naẓrah fī Munjid al-Adab wa-al-ʻUlum (نظرة في منجد الأدب والعلوم). 1972.
- al-Taʻāshīb (التعاشيب). 1975.
- Dhikrayāt Mashāhīr Rijāl al-Maghrib (ذكريات مشاهير رجال المغرب). 2010.

== Legacy ==
Abdellah Guennoun's personal library, which he donated in 1985 to the City of Tangier, has been housed since his death in the former building of the Moroccan Debt Administration.
