= Nadia Essalmi =

Moroccan publisher and writer (born 1962)

- نادية السالمي
- Born: 1962; Casablanca, Morocco
- Occupation(s): publisher and writer
- Years active: 1998 - present
- Known for: Literature for Moroccan children and young adults
- Website: Yomad Editions

Nadia Essalmi, (Arabic: نادية السالمي; born 1962 in Casablanca, Morocco) is a Moroccan publisher and writer. Founder of the Yomad publishing house, she is known for her contributions to the promotion of children's literature in Morocco. Since their beginnings in 1998, Essalmi and Yomad have published about 100 stories for children and young readers reflecting Moroccan culture in French, Arabic and the official Berber language Tamazight.

== Biography ==
Born in 1962, Essalmi practiced gymnastics during her youth and was a member of the country's national team from 1969 to 1974. She studied French literature and taught French at the Hassan-II Agronomic and Veterinary Institute in Rabat. She then coordinated the production of the cultural magazine of the Moroccan Association of Book Professionals (AMPL), getting to know people in professions related to publishing.

In 1998, she decided to publish books for children and young readers reflecting Moroccan culture, as most literature for such readers was imported from France. She created the first Moroccan publishing house in this field, Yomad, publishing works in French, Arabic, or the official Berber language Tamazight. In the beginning, she asked well-known Moroccan writers, such as Driss Chraïbi, Abdellatif Laâbi, Abdelhak Serhane, Habib Mazini, and Zakya Daoud, to provide her with literary works for children and young people: "I asked them for texts, and they were kind enough to accept, it was very simple," she said. Further, Yomad also has published some non-Moroccan authors. For example, Essalmi chose a book by Mohamed Dib, an Algerian author writing in French, and published his work as a bilingual edition in French and Arabic. In 2001, the story Zaïna et le fils du vent was chosen by highschool students for the Grand Atlas Award, a yearly contest to promote Moroccan literature. In addition to her editorial activities, Essalmi has also organized workshops and other activities to promote books and reading among young people.

In 2016, she was elected vice-president of the Union of Moroccan Publishers. In 2018, she became a writer with her book entitled La révolte des rêves (The Rebellion of Dreams), with a preface by Moroccan writer Fouad Laroui. In the first part, she expressed her anger and indignation against social injustice, lack of civility and culture, while avoiding any moralism. The second part is, according to the author, a collection of "daring poetic texts to break the many taboos of our society".

In a scholarly article of 2010, Moroccan publishers Yacine Retnani and Pauline Dod acknowledged two publishers active in promoting children’s books, Yanbow al Kitab and Yomad that can be compared to international norms. Further, the affordable prices of their books make it possible for "children from disadvantaged social backgrounds to have access to books".

In 2024, the UNESCO Courier published an article about Essalmi's career and contributions to the promotion of children's literature in Morocco.

== See also ==
- Moroccan literature
- Layla Chaouni
- Abdelkader Retnani
