= Muhammad al-Hajwi =

Moroccan reformist scholar and minister (1874–1956)

- محمد الحجوي

Minister of Education
- Monarch: Yusuf

Deputy Minister of Education
- In office 1912–1914
- Monarchs: Abd al-Hafid; Yusuf

Personal details
- Born: c. 1874 Fes, Morocco
- Died: 6 October 1956 (aged 81–82) Rabat, Morocco
- Parent: Hasan ibn al-Arabi al-Hajwi

Religious life
- Religion: Islam
- Jurisprudence: Maliki
- Creed: Athari
- Movement: Salafism
- Education: al-Qarawiyyin University
- Arabic name
- Personal (Ism): Muḥammad
- Patronymic (Nasab): ibn al-Ḥasan ibn al-‘Arabī ibn Muḥammad ibn Abī Ya‘zā ibn ‘Abd al-Salām ibn al-Ḥasan
- Toponymic (Nisba): al-Ḥajwī al-Thaʿālibī al-Fāsī al-J‘afarī al-Hāshimī al-Zaynabī

Muḥammad ibn al-Ḥasan al-Ḥajwī (Arabic: محمد بن الحسن الحجوي; c. 1874 – 6 October 1956) was a Moroccan polymath, reformist activist and minister in pre-colonial and protectorate-era Morocco.

== Early life and education ==
Muhammad ibn al-Hasan al-Hajwi was born in Fes in 1874 to a prominent Fassi family. His father, Ḥasan ibn al-‘Arabī al-Ḥajwī, was a successful merchant who travelled extensively throughout Europe and the Middle East. He also lived in Manchester for 8 years. His mother came from the scholarly Guennoun family of Fes. Under his father's tutelage, he recited the Qur’ān, memorized authoritative Prophetic traditions, and learned Islamic jurisprudence and Arabic poetry. At a young age, al-Hajwi showed an interest in history. In his autobiography, he attributes his religious and moral upbringing to his mother and paternal grandmother. According to al-Hajwi, from them he inherited his love of study, knowledge, virtue, religious devotion, and piety.

al-Hajwi began his formal education at the age of seven. He initially attended a private local school. There he continued his studies, perfected his Quranic recitation, mastered reading and writing, studied arithmetic and grammar and memorised basic texts of jurisprudence. After, he entered into a public school where he studied Quranic exegesis and the study of the Arabic language. At age 16, al-Hajwi entered into the Qarawiyyin University, the most prestigious educational institution in Fes. There he studied with distinguished Morccan scholars a number of Islamic sciences: Quran, hadith, jurisprudence, mysticism, grammar, and rhetoric. He also furthered his knowledge in poetry, literature, history, philosophy, geography, arithmetic, and algebra.

== Career ==
In 1900, he jointed the entourage of Abd al-Aziz of Morocco. From 1900 to 1905, he held various positions in the government of Abd al-Aziz. He was appointed in 1900 as sultan’s representative for judicial affairs (awwal waẓīf, lit. 'first officer') in Meknes. He was promoted in 1902 to the position of custom agent (amīn) of the city of Oujda. This was the official that oversaw the collection of taxes. In 1903, in response to the attacks of Bou Hmara, he was nominated to the office of Army Inspector (mufattish al-jaish) of the military station in Oujda. He functioned as the deputy (nāʼib) of the Minister of War who was Mehdi al-Menebhi at this time. In these positions, al-Hajwi advocated for reform and introduced new measures intended to improve administrative efficiency and effectiveness. Due to his successes, he was promoted to rank of sultan's viceroy (nāʼib al-malik) on the border between Morocco and Algeria. In 1904, al-Hajwi participated in the council of notables (majlis al-a‘yān) established by Abd al-Aziz to discuss the French reform proposal. He was then sent, in that same year, to the border of Algeria to lead a delegation of Moroccan notables. These years gave al-Hajwi deep insight into the shortcomings of the Moroccan government and the need for reform of Moroccan government. He was also exposed to the French colonial administration which alongside their educational system he found impressive.

His close links to the French administration generated controversy. He lost favour with the Makhzen and he was removed from office due to the influence of powerful ministers. Furthermore, he was disgraced with the ascension of Abd al-Hafid as sultan. This caused him to become politically isolated. He spent the next seven years mostly teaching in Fes. He also returned to the Qarawiyyin to study history and law further. In 1911, as Morocco's situation became tenser, he wrote two letters to the Sultan Abd al-Hafid where he gave advice. In these letters, he laid out a programme of reforms and subtly critiqued the Moroccan government at the time. These letters fall under the literary genre of advice (naṣīḥa)

In 1912, during the final days of the rule of Abd al-Hafid, he was appointed Deputy Minister of Education (nā’ib al-ṣadāra al-‘uẓmā fī wizārat al-‘ulūm wa’l-ma’ārif). In that same year, under the new Sultan Yusuf, he was appointed counsellor to Yusuf's government assigned first to public education then to justice. His position as Deputy Education Minister lasted until 1914. He earned a reputation as a reformer and modernist and he aimed to overhaul the education system by synthesising traditional Arab-Muslim education with European schools. Furthermore, he wanted to reform the Qarawiyyin University. However, his reforms were opposed by many especially the ulama. They saw these reforms as a political danger that masked French cultural domination. Disappointed with this failure, he resigned and returned to Fes where he would continue teaching and commerce.

In 1919, he was sent by Sultan Yusuf to Paris as part of a delegation attending the Bastille Day celebrations. He appeared as a katib and a representative of the Fes and the Oriental with representatives of other regions that provided contingents for World War I. al-Hajwi wrote an account of his travel to France after his return to Morocco which was published after his death. A French translation was made by Alain Roussillon and Abdallah Saaf. After France, he briefly travelled to England visiting London and Manchester.

al-Hajwi was impressed by France to the point of suggesting that the "civilizational" choices implemented by European societies gave them moral superiority which justified their domination over the rest of the world. al-Hajwi justified the colonial order saying

Dieu soit loué, les idées des Anglais et celles des Français sont les mêmes : les uns et les autres veulent préserver l’ordre et la sécurité, favoriser le progrès (al-irtiqâ’), diffuser la science. Ils ne s’opposent à la religion de quiconque et ne s’en prennent qu’à ceux qui veulent semer le désordre, prêcher la révolte ou la désobéissance à la loi

[Praise be to God, the ideas of the English and the French are the same: both want to preserve order and security, promote progress (al-irtiqâ’), and spread knowledge. They do not oppose anyone's religion and only target those who seek to sow disorder, preach rebellion, or disobey the law.]

al-Hajwi was appointed Delegate for Education in 1921 functioning as the Sultan's representative for education where he oversaw both public French schools and the traditional Arab-Muslim education system.. He had this position until 1939 and during this period he wrote a number of texts. In a 1937 speech on Tunisian radio, al-Hajwi delivered a speech The Conclusive Statement about the Maximum Term of Pregnancy (al-Qawl al-faṣl fī aqṣā amad al-ḥaml) where he defended prolonged pregnancy. In 1947, al-Hajwi began his 21-hour long trip to Hajj where he flew from Salé to Algiers and then to Tunis. He then travelled through Tripoli and Benghazi and ended up in Cairo where he stayed for a few days visiting religious and touristic sites. After, via Luxor, he flew to Jeddah. When he was in Mecca, he was treated as a special guest of King Abd al-Aziz and he was offered the honour of participating in the cleaning of the Kaaba. While he was supportive of some of the reforms enacted by Saudi Arabia, he had several criticisms like the state of modern science, the usurpation of waqf revenues by the government and the neglect of Medina.

== Views ==
According to Moroccan historian Abdallah Laroui, al-Hajwi was the leader of a moderate liberal reform movement.

=== Fiqh and Salafism ===
Muhammad al-Hajwi referred to himself as a Salafi in creed and Maliki in law. He also wrote a pro-Wahhabi article. Despite identitying as Maliki, he was extremely critical of traditional Maliki law. In particular, he believed that the constant practice of taqlīd was holding back the Muslim community and was critical of the number of commentaries and abridgements of earlier works that had been created over the past centuries. He believed that energy would be better spent on developing understanding of the Quran, the Sunnah and the principles of fiqh:

Most of the works from which fatwās are derived enumerate legal cases (furū‘) without offering any proof, except for [reference to] the Muwaṭṭā’ [of Mālik] and its commentaries, and the Mudawwana [of Saḥnūn]. I was surprised to read fatwās of some of the later scholars. They issue legal opinions that are guided by naïve thinking without referring to any text of the earlier scholars. In this way, one finds legal cases [argued by] al-Zurqānī that are commentaries on [legal opinions] of Khalīl and others, and people accept that with the utmost ease. Furthermore, even if one issued a fatwā referring to the Qur’ān, the sunna, or qiyās, he then set off an uproar and was insulted.

— al-Fikr al-Sāmī

He believed that Islamic law was in a state of decay and he cited the indiscriminate resorting to the ʿamal of Fez by his contemporaries as a sign of it. The cure to all these problems in his view was ijtihad and the path to it would lie in educational reform.

=== Education ===
He believed that traditional education at the time was backwards and in a state of decay due to an overemphasis on adhering to the school of law (madhhab) rather than understanding the textual sources. He advocated for a modernising reform of education emphasising interaction between cultures placing importance both on traditional Arab-Muslim education and looking to Europe as a model.

=== Women's education and status ===
In 1933, al-Hajwi wrote a treatise, Taʼlīm al-fatayāt lā sufūr al-marʼa (lit. 'Girls’ Education, not Unveiling of Women'), where he advocated for and laid out his vision for women's education. He advocated for primary schools under French administration to replace the existing informal frameworks for women's advocation. Despite his advocacy for this education, he believed that after age 9 or 10 women should continue their education at home if they wished to continue it and was critical of educational systems in the Arab East like Egypt where women continued education after the age of veiling. He justified women's education using Islam and believed that Islam elevated the status of women. However, he still endorsed patriarchal norms and customs.

=== Clothing ===
al-Hajwi supported the veiling of women and that education should not be used to justify the unveiling of women which he considered sinful. He said:

Sharia protects women, guarantees their natural rights, and allows them to be veiled in dignity and honor. Whoever calls for the liberation of women is in reality opening the door to their unveiling, to immorality, to the degradation of offspring whom God commands us to protect, and to the ruin of Sharia. This is the cause of the misery of many peoples whose lives are destroyed and who live in anguish. Muslims, follow God and hold fast to the firm rope (al-habl al-matîn) of Sharia and faith […]

— Sa‘īd Binsa‘īd al-‘Alawī, Al-Ijtihād wa-l-tahdīth

al-Hajwi responded to a request from an Albanian religious scholar for a fatwa over whether it was permissible to wear the European style hat. He argued that while this hat did not undermine faith, it would have been better to avoid it since it erases distinctions between different nations. However, he also argued that pragmatically Albanian Muslim civil servants should comply with the edict imposed on them to wear it to prevent them being replaced with non-Muslims and their representation lost in government.

=== Makhzen and communal life ===
al-Hajwi believed that the Makhzen should be concerned with all aspects of communal life, particularly urban life. He believed that individualism was the primary cause of Islamic decadence and that it negatively affected traditional communal Muslim institutions like the habous.

== Work ==
Muhammad al-Hajwi was the author of over 50 books on a variety of subjects including travel, woman's education, Islamic law and history. These include:

- al-Fikr al-sāmī fi tārīkh al-fiqh al-islāmī, his autobiography.
- Mukhtaṣar al-'urwa al-wuthqā
- Taʼlīm al-fatayāt lā sufūr al-marʼa (lit. 'Girls’ Education, not Unveiling of Women')
- al-Qawl al-faṣl fī aqṣā amad al-ḥaml (lit. 'The Conclusive Statement about the Maximum Term of Pregnancy')
- He wrote about his trip to France which is published in Sa‘īd Binsa‘īd al-‘Alawī's Urubbā fī mir'āt al-riḥla.
  - This has been translated into French by Alain Roussillon and Abdallah Saaf as Voyage d'Europe: Le Périple d'un Réformiste (lit. 'A Journey Through Europe: The Travels of a Reformer').

== Death and legacy ==
Muhammad al-Hajwi died on 6 October 1956 in Rabat. He was buried in the Kasbah of Ibn Dabbab. Only one person attended his funeral and the inhabitants of the kasbah refused to pray over him so he was moved to another location. After independence, al-Hajwi was dismissed for collaboration. In the perspective of nationalist histories, al-Hajwi is regarded as one of the main supporters of French colonialism.

== See also ==
- Abu Shu'ayb ad-Dukkali
- Allal al-Fassi

== Sources ==
- Terem, Etty (2023). "Muhammad al-Hajwi (1874-1956)". In Mervin, Sabrina; Jomier, Augustin (eds.). Savants musulmans au Maghreb [Muslim scholars in the Maghreb] (in French). Diacritiques Éditions. pp. 84–103. ISBN 979-10-97093-51-8.
- Terem, Etty (2017). "Navigating Modernity: Lessons in Government and Statecraft in Precolonial Morocco". Mediterranean Studies. 25 (1): 76–97. doi:10.5325/mediterraneanstu.25.1.0076. ISSN 1074-164X.
- Roussillon, Alain (2018). "La division coloniale du monde à l'épreuve du voyage : deux Marocains à Paris en 1845 et 1919" [The colonial division of the world as tested by travel: two Moroccans in Paris in 1845 and 1919]. Réforme et politique dans le monde arabe [Reform and politics in the Arab world] (in French). pp. 161–198. ISBN 9782271119223.
- Terem, Etty (2013). "Redefining Islamic Tradition: Legal Interpretation as a Medium for Innovation in the Making of Modern Morocco". Islamic Law and Society. 20 (4): 425–475. ISSN 0928-9380.
