= Layla Chaouni =

Moroccan publisher and Human Rights activist

- Born: Layla Chaouni Benabdallah; 1953 (age 72–73); Fes, Morocco
- Citizenship: Moroccan
- Education: Mohammed V University
- Occupations: Publisher, human rights activist
- Years active: 1980s–present
- Employer: Éditions Le Fennec
- Known for: Founder and director of Éditions Le Fennec
- Movement: Women's rights, human rights

Layla Chaouni, also known as Layla Chaouni Benabdallah, (Arabic: ليلى الشاوني, born 1953 in Fes, Morocco) is a Moroccan publisher and activist for Human and Women's Rights. She is best known as director of her publishing company Éditions Le Fennec, having published more than 500 titles both in French and Arabic.

== Life and career ==
Born in 1953, she studied law and first worked for a journal of law, economics and politics at the Mohamed V University's law faculty in Rabat. In 1974, during the reign of King Hassan II of Morocco, she and her husband Mustapha Slimani were arrested and she spent ten days in the torture center of Derb Moulay Cherif in Casablanca. Her husband was only released five years later. In 1987, she created her publishing company Éditions Le Fennec and became a leading figure in publishing in Morocco. She was the first editor to publish accounts of the Years of Lead, such as Abdelkader Chaoui's Dalil al Onfouan in 1989, or Une femme nommée Rachid by Fatna El Bouih in 2000.

In 2004, Chaouni's publishing company launched a collection of paperbacks (Collection Fennec-Poche), sold at newsstands for the low price of 10 or 20 dirhams. In cooperation with Moroccan feminist writer Fatima Mernissi, whose book Sexe, Idéologie, Islam she published in 1985, Chaouni also organized writing workshops. In 1989, she became a member of the Moroccan Organization for Human Rights.

== See also ==
- Moroccan literature of the 20th century
- List of Moroccan writers
- Abdelkader Retnani
- Nadia Essalmi
