= Abdelkader Retnani =

Moroccan editor, writer, and sporting director (1945–2023)

- Born: 31 July 1945; Casablanca, French Morocco
- Died: 14 November 2023 (aged 78); Casablanca, Morocco
- Occupations: Editor; Author; Sporting director

Abdelkader Retnani (Arabic: عبدالقادر الرتناني; 31 July 1945 – 14 November 2023) was a Moroccan editor, author, and sporting director. He specialized in coffee table books covering a range of subjects, from Berber architecture to Moroccan fauna and the Cuban cigar. He was president of Raja CA from 11 December 1984 to July 1989.

== Biography ==
Born in Casablanca on 31 July 1945, Retnani became an editor in 1980 and published French-language books in Morocco. He advocated for a policy of book promotion in Morocco, believing it would help the country's youth.

In 1992, Retnani joined the board of directors of the Centre africain de formation des éditeurs et libraires. He was the organizer of the Congrès international des études francophones under Hassan II of Morocco. He also served as secretary-general of the Association des éditeurs africains francophones. He was the founding president of the Association marocaine des professionnels du livre. He also directed Éditions La Croisée des chemins and subsequently Éditions Eddif. He conferred with international organizations, such as the Organisation internationale de la Francophonie and UNESCO.

In February 2015, Retnani was named president of the Union des éditeurs du Maroc. On 10 November 2015, he launched the first official literary session in Morocco in partnership with the Ministry of Culture. In November 2021, he filed a complaint against the use of the Moroccan publishing house La Croisée des chemins by Éric Zemmour.

Abdelkader Retnani died in Casablanca on 14 November 2023, at the age of 78.

== Distinctions ==
- Officer of the Legion of Honour (2013)

== See also ==
- Moroccan literature
- Layla Chaouni
- Nadia Essalmi
