= Mohamed Zafzaf =

Moroccan novelist and poet (1945–2001)

Mohamed Zafzaf (Arabic: محمد زفزاف; 1945 – 13 July 2001) was a Moroccan Arabic-language novelist and poet. He played a pivotal role in the development of Moroccan literature in the second half of the 20th century and, due to his contributions, came to be known by such titles as "the godfather of Moroccan literature", "the Moroccan Tolstoy", "the Moroccan Dostoyevsky" and as "our great author" among his Moroccan peers.

== Biography ==
Mohamed Zafzaf, or Zefzaf, was born in Souk Larbaa El Gharb. He experienced hardship in his early life, his father having died when he was only five years old. He studied philosophy at the Faculty of Letters and Human Sciences at Mohammed V University in the Moroccan capital, Rabat, and after graduation began working as an Arabic teacher in a junior high school in Kenitra, later on working as a librarian at the school library. He later left this job and moved to Casablanca, where he began to live a bohemian lifestyle and work as an author. There he became friendly with fellow Moroccan authors Driss El Khouri and Mohamed Choukri.

Zafzaf began his literary career in the 1960s as a poet, publishing his first poem in 1962. His field of work soon began to expand to short stories and novels as well, his first short story being published in 1963. Zafzaf had his early short stories published in important Middle Eastern literary magazines, in countries such as Iraq, Lebanon and Egypt, which gained him a reputation as a writer across the wider Arab region. Zafzaf joined the Writers' Union of Morocco in July 1968 and began publishing his own independent works in the early 70s. In 1970 he published his first collection of short stories and in 1972 his first novel, which was critically acclaimed by Arab literary critics.

When his novel The Woman and the Rose was translated into Spanish, King Juan Carlos I sent him a congratulations letter. Mohamed Zafzaf kept this letter on the wall of his house.

Zafzaf was known for his bohemian style, and his ever-present long hair and grown beard earned him the title of the "Moroccan Dostoyevsky". He was a vocal supporter of the Palestinian cause and could often be seen wearing a Palestinian-style Kuffiya.

He died in July 2001 at the age of 58 after a battle with cancer.

The prestigious Mohamed Zafzaf Prize for Arabic Literature was named in his honor. Since 2002, it is awarded once every three years at the International Cultural Festival in Asilah to authors of Arabic literature from around the Arab world who exhibit innovation in their literary work.

== Bibliography ==
=== Novels ===
- 1972: The Woman and the Rose (المرأة والوردة), Beirut.
- 1974: Sidewalks and Walls (أرصفة وجدران), Baghdad.
- 1978: Graves in the Water (قبور في الماء), Tunis.
- 1979: The Snake and the Sea (الأفعى والبحر), Casablanca.
- 1984: The Cockerel's Egg (بيضة الديك), Casablanca.
- 1985: An Attempt at Life (محاولة عيش), Tunis.
- 1989: The Fox who Appears and Vanishes (الثعلب الذي يظهر ويختفي), Casablanca.
- 1992: The Rear Neighborhood (الحي الخلفي), Rabat.
- 1993: The Wagon (العربة), Rabat.
- 1998: Wide Mouths (أفواه واسعة), Casablanca.

=== Short stories collections ===
- 1970: A Conversation Late at Night (حوار في ليل متأخر), Damascus.
- 1977: Low Houses (بيوت واطئة), Casablanca.
- 1978: The Strongest (الأقوى), Damascus.
- 1980: The Holy Tree (الشجرة المقدسة), Beirut.
- 1982: Gypsies in the Forest (غجر في الغابة), Beirut.
- 1988: King of the Jinns (ملك الجن), Casablanca.
- 1988: White Angel (ملاك أبيض), Cairo.
- 1993: The Cart (العربة), Rabat.
- 1996: The Flower-Seller.

=== Translated works ===
- 2013: Cuentos selectos de Mohamed Zefzaf. Tangier. Translated by Adel Fartakh.
- 2020: Tentative de vie. Virgule, Tangier. Translated by Siham Bouhlal.

=== Works available in English ===
- 2014: Monarch of the Square: An Anthology of Muhammad Zafzaf’s Short Stories. Syracuse University Press, Syracuse, New York. Translated by Roger Allen, Mbarek Sryfi.
- 2016: The Elusive Fox. Syracuse University Press, Syracuse, New York. Translated by Mbarek Sryfi.
