= Tarhouggalt =

Tarhouggalt Taɣggʷalt
- Location in Morocco
- Coordinates: 30°53′23″N 7°59′46″W
- Country: Morocco
- Region: Souss-Massa
- Province: Taroudant Province
- Elevation: 6,706 ft (2,044 m)
- Time zone: UTC+0 (GMT)

Tarhouggalt (Shilha Berber: Taɣggʷalt, Arabic: تاغكالت) is a village on the southern slopes of the High Atlas mountains, in Taroudant Province, Souss-Massa Region, in Morocco. Its claim to fame is that it is the birthplace of the Shilha Berber poet Sidi Ḥammu.
