= Hemmou Talb =

Sidi Hemmou Talb
- حمو الطالب
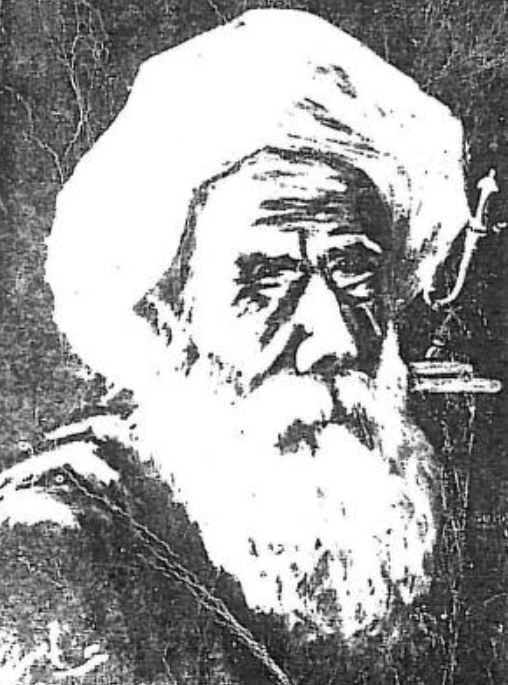
- Born: 1706
- Died: January 1, 1789 (aged 82–83)

Hemmou Talb (Tachelhit: Ḥmmu Ṭṭalb) is an 18th-century composer of poems in the Tashelhit language of southwestern Morocco. In the Tashelhit Berber oral tradition, he is also known as Bab n Umarg, "the Master of Poetry", and a great number of poems still recited today are ascribed to him. About his life nothing is known with certainty.

== Names ==
The poet is known by various names. He is most commonly known simply as Sidi Ḥemmu, this being the name used in the oral tradition as well as in printed publications (also spelled Sidi Hammo, Sidi Hammou). Sidi "my Lord" is an honorary title borrowed from Arabic. Ḥammu is a colloquial variant of Muḥammad current among speakers of Shilha.

He is also known as Ḥammu Ggʷzgruz (or, in Arabic: Muḥammad al-Zagrūzī) "Ḥammu of Azegrouz", after the name of the subtribe to which he belonged (see below).

In Shilha, his nickname is Bab n Umarg "Master of Poetry".

The poet is also sometimes called Sidi Ḥammu al-Ṭālib "Sidi Ḥammu the Scholar". According to Johnston, "it is highly improbable that Sidi Hammo ever read a book, save some necessary portions of the Koran. Among the highlanders of the great range, a little learning goes a long way, and the man who can decipher the chapter of the day easily passes for a sage". However, Amarir explains that in order to earn the Arabic title ṭālib, literally "seeker (of knowledge)", one must not only have memorized the entire text of the Qur'an, being able to recite it at will, but one must also have some grounding in "the sciences" (i.e., Arabic grammar, exegesis of the Qur'an, Islamic law, etc.) and evince a good understanding of what has been learned. Hence, Sidi Ḥammu "the Scholar" may have had more learning than Johnston allowed.

== Life ==
Sidi Ḥammu's dates are not known with any certainty. Amarir discusses the various proposals made earlier by Stumme and Johnston, and concludes that the poet most probably flourished in the second half of the 18th century.

Johnston suggests that Sidi Ḥammu was "probably a native of Aoulouz on the southern slope of the Atlas Mountains". Amarir, who actually visited the poet's native area in 1980, found out that Sidi Ḥammu was born some distance to the northwest of Aoulouz, in the village of Tarhouggalt (Taɣggʷalt), and that this village belonged to the tribe of Azegrouz (Azgruz).

About his death, Johnston records that Sidi Ḥammu "In all probability died in the Iskrouzen district among his well-beloved mountains. His shrine stands there to-day, and is a well-known place of pilgrimage". Internet sources do not contain any reference to a place or district in Morocco called Iskrouzen. Amarir states that according to his sources, Sidi Ḥammu is buried in or near the tomb of Mawlāy Ibrāhīm ibn Aḥmad al-Amghārī, a Sufi saint who died in 1661 CE, in the town of Moulay Brahim which is named after him.

No detail of Sidi Ḥammu's life are known, except that he was an itinerant poet and singer (Shilha anḍḍam). Both Stumme and Johnston report, on the basis of oral sources, that Sidi Ḥammu was of dark complexion.

== Work ==
Poems ascribed to Sidi Ḥammu have been gathered from the Shilha oral tradition by several researchers. They are the German linguist Hans Stumme, the Englishman R.L.N. Johnston (longtime resident of Essaouira) and the Moroccan scholar Omar Amarir.

== See also ==
- Muhammad Awzal
