= Muhammad ibn at-Tayib ar-Rudani =

Moroccan judge and wadi

Muhammad Ibn at-Tayib ar-Rudani was a Moroccan qadi who brought the first Arabic printing press to Morocco in 1864. He came from a learned family from Taroudant.

== Press ==
He brought the printing press back from Egypt when he traveled to the Mashreq to perform the Hajj to Mecca. The press arrived at the port of Essaouira in 1864. It was named al-matba'a as-sa'ida (المطبعة السعيدة 'the felicitous printing press'). The first work it published was an edition of Al-Tirmidhi's 9th century hadith collection Ash-Shama'il al-Muhammadiyya.
