= Allal al-Fassi =

Moroccan politician and writer (1910–1974)

Zaʿīm Shaykh Allal al-Fassi
- علال الفاسي
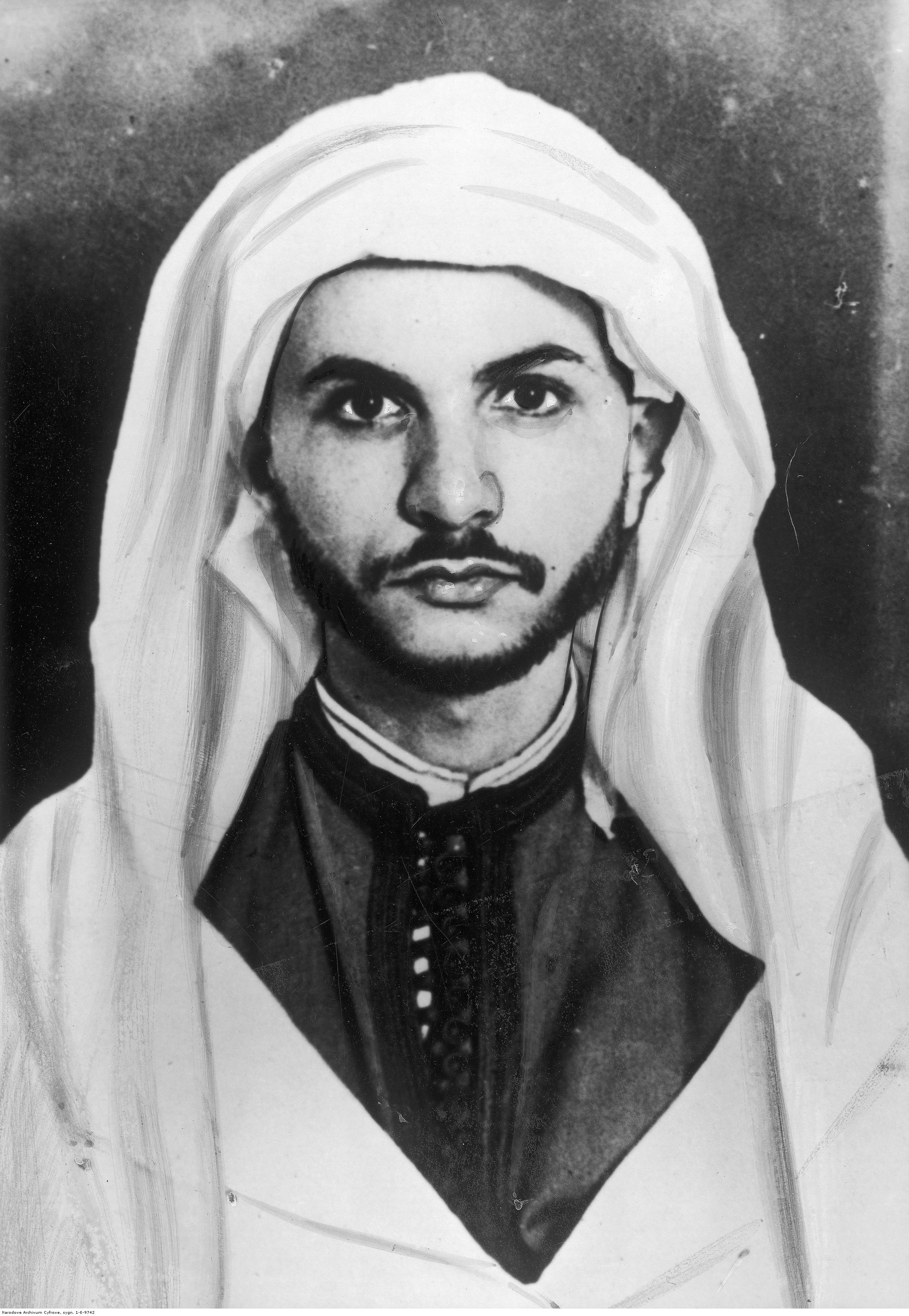
- Allal al-Fassi c. 1937

Minister of Islamic Affairs
- In office June 1961 – January 1963
- Monarch: Hassan II

Leader of the Istiqlal Party
- In office 1956–1974
- Succeeded by: M'hamed Boucetta

Personal details
- Born: 10 January 1910 Fes, Morocco
- Died: 13 May 1974 (aged 64) Bucharest, Romania
- Party: Istiqlal
- Other political affiliations: Moroccan Action Committee (1934‍–‍1937); National Party (1937‍–‍1944)
- Relations: Mohamed El Fassi (cousin); Malika al-Fassi (cousin); Abd al-Kabir al-Fassi (cousin); Nizar Baraka (grandson); Abbas El Fassi (son-in-law); Mohamed El Ouafa (son-in-law)
- Children: 5, including Abdelouahed
- Parents: Abd al-Wahid al-Fassi

Religious life
- Religion: Islam
- Creed: Ash'ari
- Movement: Neo-Salafiyya; Islamic Modernism

Muslim leader
- Influenced by: Rashid Rida; Muhammad Abduh; Jamal al-Din al-Afghani; Mohammed Ben al-Arabi al-Alaoui
- Influenced: Taha Abdurrahman
- Education: al-Qarawiyyin University

Muhammad Allal al-Fassi (Arabic: محمد علال الفاسي, romanized: Muḥammad ʿAllāl al-Fāsī; 10 January 1910 – 13 May 1974) was a Moroccan politician, poet and Islamic scholar who was one of the early leaders of the Moroccan nationalist movement. Upon independence in 1956, he became leader of the Istiqlal Party representing it until his death in 1974. He served briefly as Minister of Islamic Affairs from 1961 to 1963.

Born into the prominent scholarly Fassi Fihri family, al-Fassi became involved in the Moroccan nationalist movement at a young age during his years as a student at al-Qarawiyyin. In response to the Berber Dahir, he helped to arouse protest and began to coordinate with other nationalists leading to the formation of nationalist parties like the Moroccan Action Committee. After riots broke out in 1937, al-Fassi was exiled to Gabon for 10 years. During his exile, the Istiqlal Party was formed and he was given the honorary role of zaʿīm.

Whilst in self-exile in Cairo, al-Fassi collaborated with other nationalist leaders from the Maghreb. After independence, he was appointed head of the codification commission for the Mudawana. After his resignation as Minister of Islamic Affairs, al-Fassi became a prominent opposition leader against Hassan II's government. He died of a heart attack on a trip to Romanian leader Nicolae Ceaușescu.

Al-Fassi was a "neo-Salafist" who advocated for the synthesis of nationalism and reformist Salafism. As an advocate for an Arab-Islamic identity for Morocco, he wanted a Morocco that imposed Arabisation and ruled by Sharia. He developed the idea of Greater Morocco. He was also a prolific writer who wrote over forty books and articles.

Al-Fassi has been described as the "father of Moroccan nationalism".

== Early life and education ==
Muhammad Allal al-Fassi was born in Fes on 10 January 1910 to a prominent bourgeois Andalusian family known as the Fassi Fihri family. This family claimed descent from the Umayyad general Uqba ibn Nafi. His father, Abd al-Wahid al-Fassi, was a judge and grand mufti who served as doctor of divinity at Qarawiyyin. Abd al-Wahid was also a merchant who founded the Nasiriyyah Free School in Fes. Al-Fassi's mother came from a prominent mercantile family known as the Ma'safirine family who held considerable influence in northern Morocco.

Al-Fassi entered a Quranic school at the age of five and had memorized the Quran by seven. Before attending Qarawiyyin, he was a student in the Nasiriyyah Free School. Beginning in 1924, he studied at the University of al-Qarawiyyin where he received a purely Arab education. In this time, as a student, al-Fassi was highly influenced by the Salafi thinker Mohammed Ben al-Arabi al-Alaoui.

== Career ==
=== Early nationalist activity ===
According to al-Fassi, he became politically conscious in 1925 when the French authorities attempted to appropriate water from the Oued Fes to divert it to French companies. When he enrolled at Qarawiyyin University, he associated with older students who had begun their nationalist activities in 1919. Al-Fassi, describing the development of early nationalism in Morocco and the influence of the Salafiya, says:

The Moroccan youths found in the Salafiyah movement a field for action and a training center for disciplined service and sacrifice. They formed centers in Fez, Rabat, and Tetuan for participation in public affairs. Opposition to the sheikhs who had benefited from the protectorate regime was foremost in their program of action. Small study groups sprang up for investigating outstanding public issues and enlightening public opinion in regard to them. The Karaouiyine University at Fez was a meeting place for students from all parts of the land, and we considered it our duty to instill into them the spirit of the Salafiyah and the nationalist creeds.

In 1926, al-Fassi set up a nationalist newsletter called Umm al-Banin. In 1927, along with other students at Qarawiyyin, al-Fassi founded the Students' Union which sought the purification of Islam and aimed to alter the teaching methods of the university. It joined with the Supporters of Truth, a student group in Rabat led by Ahmed Balafrej, in 1929 to form the Moroccan League. By 1930, al-Fassi lectured at mosques, Quranic schools and the Qarawiyyin on the theme of the Prophet and the Rashidun caliphs. He graduated with a degree in Islamic law in 1930 or 1932. He used the public lectures to express his political views, particularly his disdain for the French Protectorate. This was seen as a threat by the French administration and by 1933, the Resident-General passed a dahir forbidding al-Fassi along with two other Qarawiyyin lecturers from public speaking. He was also barred from entering Morocco in August 1933 after visiting France.

=== Beginnings of mass nationalist protest ===
In 1930, the Berber Dahir was passed, officially codifying customary law in Berber tribal areas over the Sharia. According to the historian Susan Gilson Miller, the Berber Dahir proved to be a "foundational event in the unfolding story of Moroccan nationalism". In response to this dahir, al-Fassi began coordinating with other nationalists, including Ahmed Balafrej, and organised public protest against the dahir. In al-Fassi's view, the dahir was "barbaric" seeking to eliminate the native people represented by Arab and Islamic culture by replacing that culture with pre-Islamic Berber customs. Al-Fassi was arrested twice during these protests. As a result of the Dahir, he also met prominent Lebanese Pan-Arabist Shakib Arslan. Arslan maintained ties with a number of prominent nationalists, including Balafrej and Mohamed Hassan Ouazzani, and played a significant role in helping Moroccan nationalists develop a shared sense of struggle with the rest of the Arab and Muslim world. The Berber Dahir led to the formation of the first political party in Morocco, the Moroccan Action Committee (CAM) (Note: It is also known as the National Action Block which is simplified as the Kutla.) in May 1934 which al-Fassi was the co-founder and president for. It had between 200 and 300 members. In February 1934, al-Fassi met Mohammed V who was then Sultan of Morocco under the French protectorate. Al-Fassi described him as "a great monarch" and stated that the Sultan had promised to recover the rights lost by Moroccans.

The CAM published the Plan of Reforms (French: Plan de Réformes marocaines) in 1934 in both Arabic and French. Al-Fassi was one of its ten signatories and, together with Mohammed Diouri, presented a copy to the Resident-General. The demands of the reform plan included the abolition of the Berber Dahir, the unification of legal system under Maliki law, the expansion of educational opportunities to Moroccans, the establishment of municipal councils, the appointment of Moroccans to positions of authority, and the recognition of Arabic as an official language. The reform plan did not call for independence, but instead sought reform and the full implementation of the 1912 Treaty of Fes. According to the Treaty of Fes, the purpose of the protectorate was to "establish a stable regime founded on internal order and general security that will permit the introduction of reforms and will assure the economic development of the country" while also simultaneously preserving the theoretical sovereignty of the sultan. Commenting on the reform plan, al-Fassi says:

The reform program was an ingenious stratagem to reconcile the existing treaties with the interests of the country, in the economic section, for example, the Kutla advocated the open-door policy and free trade, in accordance with the resolutions of the Algeciras Conference. This platform was designed to appeal to the support of the left-wing parties in France and to the signatories of the Algeciras international conference; at the same time, it was agreeable to the best interests of Morocco under the circumstances.

The plan was rejected by the French administration and by 1937, the nationalist movement started to split with the CAM also outlawed by the French protectorate in October 1937. The CAM split into the National Party which al-Fassi co-led and the Popular Movement (later becoming the Party of Democracy and Independence) led by al-Fassi's former ally Mohamed Hassan Ouazzani. Those who followed al-Fassi in the split self-styled as the Allaliyin or Wataniyin, while al-Fassi was known to his followers as "Shaykh Allal" or "Hajj Allal". Traditionally, the split has been explained ideologically for example by the orientalist Robin Bidwell and according to the political scientist Adria Lawrence, it has been often charactered as being between "traditionalists" and "Westernists". However, according to a number of scholars including Mohammed Zade and Daniel Rivet, the split was likely more to do with personality differences and disagreements over the structure of leadership. On the surface, al-Fassi's party remained reformist, while Ouazzani's party claimed to be more radical; in fact, the two parties were ideologically similar. Out of the groups that split, al-Fassi's faction was able to garner the most success recruiting as a result of it having an administrative structure through an annual national congress, a council that met quarterly and a permanent executive committee.

=== Exile ===
After riots broke out throughout Morocco in 1937 in response to the French attempting to reroute the water supply of the Meknes area to irrigate French farms, al-Fassi was exiled to Gabon. The French justified the exile by accusing al-Fassi of conspiring to overthrow the protectorate to crown himself king. According to the academic Amnon Cohen, this was unlikely as al-Fassi had not made demands for independence yet nor was he opposed to the monarchy. It is more likely he was exiled because his opposition to the French caused political instability. He also spent part of his exile in the Congo. Despite his exile, he continued to exert influence over the nationalist movement. The scholar Ian Shaw says "His years of exile had given him the mystique of political martyrdom". He was isolated during this exile only being allowed to speak to his father but that too was restricted. During al-Fassi's exile, starting from 1941, Charles de Gaulle entered into contact with him hoping to use al-Fassi in a coup against the Vichy government in Morocco to bring it to the Free French fold. However, out of suspicion that al-Fassi was in contact with a foreign power, De Gaulle broke off this contact.

The Istiqlal Party was founded in 10 December 1943 by former members of the CAM. This party submitted their manifesto for independence on 11 January 1944 although al-Fassi did not sign it. Al-Fassi was given the role of zaʿīm of the Istiqlal. According to the academic John Waterbury, this role was "purely honorary". The formation of the Istiqlal was met with peaceful demonstrations in support in the major cities. However, the French responded to this harshly by arresting a number of nationalist leaders like Balafrej accusing them of collaborating with Nazi Germany. This in turn led to more violence.

To solve this crisis, the French appointed a new Resident-General, Eric Labonne, who initiated a more liberal policy like freeing nationalist leaders and a number of other concessions. As a result, in 1947, al-Fassi, alongside other nationalist leaders, returned to Morocco from exile. Their return was marked by large public banquets and parades in Fes and Rabat, and contributed to an increase in Istiqlal's membership. This ten year period of exile only increased al-Fassi's legitimacy as a representative of the nation. He soon became the official leader of Istiqlal and founded the newspaper Al-Alam.

Al-Fassi shortly left for Cairo to self-exile due to clashes with the king and the Istiqlal leadership as he felt that his role as leader was purely symbolic lacking any decision-making power. Another reason why he left was the hardening of French policies in Morocco. In Egypt, he established links with leaders and diplomats from across the Arab World. Al-Fassi's widespread popularity around the Arab World brought widespread attention to Maktab al-Maghrib, a Cairo-based organisation that served as the local headquarters of nationalist parties from across North Africa. He also established links with Amin al-Husseini and the Muslim Brotherhood. According to French intelligence, the Brotherhood supported Maghrebis logistically and financially because their leader, Hassan al-Banna, became a friend of al-Fassi. On 23 July 1952, the Egyptian revolution of 1952 led to the overthrow of Egypt's monarchy. The new regime dissolved the Muslim Brotherhood and banned all other political parties. Al-Fassi's links with the Muslim Brotherhood proved problematic when he returned to Cairo in 1953. The association damaged his standing in the eyes of the new ruling class, while the Egyptian media and political establishment increasingly lost interest in him.

Whilst in Cairo, al-Fassi became a lecturer at Al-Azhar University. Furthermore, he began collaborating with other nationalist leaders like Abd el-Krim al-Khattabi, Abdelkhalek Torres and Habib Bourguiba and they formed the Committee for the Liberation of the Arab Maghreb. In 1952, he went for a world tour to gain international support travelling to and lecturing in Europe, South America, North America and the Middle East. He also went to the UN to plea the case for Moroccan independence and put pressure on France. This period in Cairo was when he wrote his most important writings like The Independence Movements in Arab North Africa (1947) and Self-Criticism (1951).

=== Exile of Mohammed V ===
On 20 August 1953, Sultan Mohammed V was exiled by the French. His exile led to the rise of militant nationalism leading to the formation of clandestine armed groups like the Moroccan Army of Liberation (MLA). The MLA initially praised al-Fassi as their nominal leader and al-Fassi was linked to the MLA through his cousin Abd al-Kabir al-Fassi, one of its leaders. On October 1, 1955, the MLA launched an offensive against French outposts in the Taza region from Spanish Morocco. Al-Fassi sought to capitalise on his influence over the MLA. In Cairo, al-Fassi announced that the MLA was engaged in a struggle (jihad) to free Mohammed V and the rest of North Africa. Al-Fassi refused to enter into negotiations with France until Mohammed V was allowed to return in November.

On October 17, al-Fassi returned to Tetouan from Cairo and toured the Spanish zone. He received enthusiastic crowds from cities like Tetouan, Larache and Ksar el-Kebir. However, this publicity campaign had little relation with actual MLA military operations. Despite being accompanied with an MLA commander, al-Fassi never inquired into the morale or physical conditions of MLA troops. MLA and Istiqlal leaders met in March and after, al-Fassi declared an end to the jihad. This prompted the MLA high command to issue its own declaration, stating that no one else was authorised to speak on its behalf or to mediate between it and the king. Al-Fassi met Abdelkhalek Torres on 16 March 1956 and they agreed to join both their parties. On the 2 March 1956, Morocco's became independent from France, with Spain withdrawing from the northern zone the following month.

=== Post-independence tensions 1956–1959 ===
In July 1956, al-Fassi first proposed the idea of Greater Morocco. He survived an assassination attempt near Boulemane (a rural Berber stronghold in the Middle Atlas) in the summer of that same year during a tour of the countryside where he devoted speeches dedicated to historical analyses of the common historical and religious background between the Berbers and the Arabs.

Between 1947 and 1956, the Istiqlal went through a period of significant expansion. In 1944, party membership was estimated at around three thousand later expanding to ten thousand in 1947 and after 1952, one hundred thousand. In the 1950s, it reached two hundred and fifty thousand members and by the early months of Moroccan independence, it reached 1.6 million. After independence, al-Fassi was appointed secretary-general and later president for life of the Istiqlal. In the period following independence, the Istiqlal sought to form a government composed entirely of its own members. However, this would have reduced the monarch to just a figurehead. Fearing that the monarchy might become subordinate to the party or confined to a largely ceremonial role, Mohammed V increasingly came into conflict with the Istiqlal. Although the party remained outwardly loyal to the monarchy, it nevertheless questioned a number of the King's policies.

By 1956, two factions emerged within the Istiqlal: a left wing and right wing. The party's right wing consisted of older leaders such as al-Fassi, Ahmed Balafrej and Mohamed Lyazidi, while the left wing comprised MLA leaders and younger figures associated with the Moroccan Workers' Union. It came to include Mehdi Ben Barka and Abderrahim Bouabid. The split was not merely a dispute between personalities but was also reflected ideological differences. The left wing was made up of democratic socialists who supported social welfare and state control of key sectors of the economy. They opposed the presence of American military bases, advocated popular elections and demanded limits on the power of the monarchy. The right wing, which constituted the majority, was economically liberal and politically conservative. It supported the continued presence of American bases, arguing that the government required economic assistance from the United States. It also opposed popular elections out of concern that they might result in a loss of political power.

In order to maintain its wavering dominance, the early Istiqlal-dominated government engaged in political repression which led to the anti-Istiqlal Rif Revolt. After the revolt, tensions began to grow in Moroccan society with much of the Moroccan population suffering from poverty and many opposing the continued presence of American military bases. This widened the gap between the two wings of the Istiqlal.

By spring of 1958, Mohammed V had given into most of the demands of the Istiqlal. He appointed Ahmed Balafrej prime minister and foreign minister and Abderrahim Bouabid minister of finances and economy whilst keeping palace men in other key posts. However, in the summer of that same year, the left wing broke with the conservative leadership with the left denouncing the Balafrej government and calling a wave of strikes. Bouabid resigned in the aftermath of the Rif Revolt. Initially, Muhammad V turned to al-Fassi in an effort to broker a truce between the factions of the Istiqlal. Al-Fassi proposed giving the left wing several government posts but it was rejected by Bouabid as he insisted that Driss M'Hammedi should be minister of the interior due to his familiarity with the tribes and ability to speak Berber. When al-Fassi failed, Mohammed V lent his support to the left wing by appointing Moroccan Workers' Union leader Abdallah Ibrahim as prime minister. The king did this to encourage the split within the party which would end Istiqlal's chances to establish a one-party system. This plan was successful as it led to al-Fassi retiring from the party and the radical Ben Barka being excluded from the government. This eventually led to the formation of a new party led by Ben Barka called the National Union of Popular Forces (UNFP). Al-Fassi later returned back to the leadership of the Istiqlal in late 1958 when both he and the party's interests aligned again.

After independence, in 1956, al-Fassi was appointed professor of Islamic law in the newly created University of Rabat. In October 1957, a codification committee was established to codify the Mudawana, the Moroccan family code. al-Fassi was selected to become the head of the codification committee. He received the designation "reporter" (muqarrir). The purpose of the Mudawana, according to anthropologist Jamila Bargach, was to try to reclaim the "pure uncorrupted sources of Islamic teachings, to shed their un-Islamic interpretations, all of this in a more accessible, more 'modern' format" and it was influenced by the Salafiya movement. It claimed to uphold Maliki law but including things that diverged from Maliki norms. Al-Fassi believed it impacted Islamic jurisprudence positively saying that the Mudawana "was considered by all a progressive [and] outstanding action in the framework of Islamic law."

=== In government and opposition ===
From June 1961 to January 1963, al-Fassi served briefly as Morocco's Minister of Islamic Affairs. At this time, the ministry only had a marginal role with the only purpose of overseeing the administration of waqf lands. Under his ministership, the 1962 constitution introduced the title "Commander of the Faithful" for the king and guaranteed a constitutional monarchy and parliament. In 1961, in Tangier, the League of Moroccan 'Ulema was established with al-Fassi as head. He resigned as minister due to the international backlash from the Baháʼí affair, which was the arrest of 14 Baháʼí Faith adherents in Nador in 1962 who were accused of proselytisation. Al-Fassi was one of the main supporters for their prosecution and he even tried to go further than the king to show his commitment to the Islamic cause. He was elected to the Parliament in May 1963 and served until 1965. In February 1961, Mohammed V died and was succeeded by his son Hassan II. Under Hassan II's rule, al-Fassi became part of the political opposition. Despite his constitutional monarchism, he opposed Hassan's growing authoritarianism. In 1964, he made a speech in Parliament implying that the King was failing in his duties as a religious figure:

In our country, we see everywhere that church steeples are surpassing in height our skyscrapers and minarets. This religious propaganda on the part of foreign sects is striking and we are forced to ask ourselves which of the two communities [Christian or Muslim] is better off. There are now in Morocco more churches and temples than mosques and Islamic schools. And all of this foreign religious activity is not being met by action on the part of our government to preserve the Muslim soul.

In 1971 and 1972, Morocco went through two subsequent coups. Al-Fassi was present during the first coup and was among the injured. As a result of the first coup, Hassan II invited both the Istiqlal and the UNFP to join the cabinet where they entered into an alliance called the National Bloc. They began talks with the palace, but these talks shortly broke down when the king announced a new constitution without consulting the parties. The National Bloc subsequently boycotted the next constitutional referendum (which passed despite this) with al-Fassi publicly turning down a renewed offer of participation in the government.

=== Death ===
Al-Fassi died on 13 May 1974 aged 64, from a myocardial infarction. He died in Bucharest, a visit to Romania where he was scheduled to meet with Nicolae Ceaușescu. This meeting was to lobby Ceaușescu to support Morocco's claim over the Spanish Sahara. He was succeeded as leader of the Istiqlal by M'hamed Boucetta.

== Views ==
Historian Susan Gilson Miller summarised al-Fassi's vision for Morocco as a "revolutionary state, deeply Islamic, vaguely monarchical, resoundingly populist, and directly responsive to the voice of the people".

=== Arabism ===
Al-Fassi envisaged an independent Morocco closely connected to Arab culture and the Middle East, and advocated a stronger Arab identity for the country. He and the Istiqlal influenced Moroccan cultural policy to define Moroccan national identity in terms of its Arab and Islamic roots and advocated for the support of the Arabic language and Islamic education. Al-Fassi believed that education would play a crucial role in shaping Morocco into a nation rooted in Arabic civilisation and Islamic culture. In his view, Arabisation especially at the elementary level of education was essential to fostering a culturally homogeneous Moroccan identity, as he regarded the preservation of local dialects as an obstacle to political and social unity. He also believed that language, as a vehicle for the transmission of ideas, exerted a profound influence on people's mentality. He launched several public campaigns like, in 1970, a petition in favour of Arabisation which was signed by 500 intellectuals and Islamic scholars and published in Al-Alam. He proposed that the phrase "Arab kingdom" be added to the 1962 constitution but this request was declined by the king. Whilst reluctantly supporting the presence of US bases in Morocco during the Cold War, al-Fassi also looked to the Arab League as an alternative to alignment with either the United States or the Soviet Union.

=== Salafism ===
Al-Fassi was one of the most prominent Salafists in Morocco. He advocated for what he called neo-Salafiyya (al-salafiyya al-jadida). He has been associated with Islamic modernism by scholars like Fatima Sadiqi and Edmund Burke III. Al-Fassi differed greatly from "purist Salafis" who shared more similarities to Wahhabists from Saudi Arabia and also disapproved of his conception of Salafism. He saw Salafism as a movement that meant Islamic revival and his definition of it was so broad that it could include any reformer since the 9th century as long as they affirmed tawhid, advocated for Islamic law, attempted to prevent the decline of the ummah or opposed despotism. This meant, for al-Fassi, that both Ibn Rushd and Muhammad ibn Abd al-Wahhab could be considered Salafis. He instructed students to read the Salafi writings of Rashid Rida and Muhammad Abduh who he claimed influenced the Salafist program of Morocco alongside Jamal al-Din al-Afghani.

According to scholars Frederic Wehrey and Anouar Boukhars, al-Fassi saw Salafism as "a constructive force that fostered progress and kindled nationalistic revolutionary consciousness". Al-Fassi believed Salafism "was synonymous with nationalism". In his view, Salafism was concerned neither with the interpretation of the divine attributes nor with adherence to a particular theological doctrine. Rather, what he termed "true Salafism" meant acting in accordance with the Quran and the Sunnah, responding to the demands of "evolving modes of thought", giving due weight to reason, and reflecting upon the human principles embodied in the Quran. Al-Fassi believed Morocco was predisposed to Salafist reformism because of its Sufi heritage of piety and rigour despite being opposed to 20th century Sufism. Sufism in his eyes contradicted his vision of Islam as something inherently rational, progressive and conductive to modernity. Unlike other Salafists, such as Rashid Rida, who criticised Sufism as a whole, al-Fassi held that Moroccan Sufism had remained orthodox until the 15th century.

=== Sharia ===
In the context of Islamic law, the scholar Wael Hallaq places al-Fassi among the legal reformers he terms "utilitarianists". This group sought to remain within the bounds of traditional Islamic legal theories and methodologies whilst also recognising the need to modernise the legal system. He advocated the revival of ijtihad, that is "the reinterpretation of scriptural and other foundational texts" and sought to renew Islamic jurisprudence based on ideas like istiḥsān (preference) and maṣlaḥa (utility).

Al-Fassi advocated for Sharia to serve as the basis for the Moroccan legal system. Despite his criticism of Maliki law, the Mudawana, which he helped to codify, was based on it. Al-Fassi opposed customary law in Morocco which he labelled as jahili, a "pre-Islamic custom" that ought to be abolished. He regarded it as no less objectionable than the customs of certain African tribes and argued that customary law deprived women of rights granted to them under the Sharia like inheritance rights. Al-Fassi strove to purify Islamic law from later innovations and customary elements to achieve social justice. The codification of family law through the Mudawana functioned as the first step in the Islamisation of the entire legal system. Despite his involvement in the Mudawana, he failed to establish the full jurisdiction of sharia courts. He believed that Morocco's Western-oriented, French-educated elites had become the principal exponents of Western ideals, using their positions in government to confine Islamic law to matters of personal status and inheritance. In al-Fassi's view, although the French had departed in 1956, intellectual colonialism persisted well into the 1960s.

=== Greater Morocco ===
Greater Morocco as claimed by the Istiqlal Party, 1956. Al-Fassi put forward this map of the "Moroccan Sharifian Kingdom in her natural and historical borders".

Al-Fassi is the principal intellectual advocate of the concept of "Greater Morocco" which encompassed territories he regarded as historically Moroccan before colonial rule reduced the country's territorial extent. In July 1956, he put forward a map of Greater Morocco in the Istiqlal newspaper, Al-Alam, which included all of Mauritania, parts of Western Algeria and a section of Northern Mali and all of the Spanish Sahara. In his view, Moroccan independence would remain incomplete without these territories:

... so long as Tangier is not liberated from its international status, so long as the Spanish deserts of the south, the Sahara from Tindouf and Atar and the Algerian-Moroccan borderlands are not liberated from their trusteeship, our independence will remain incomplete and our first duty will be to carry on action to liberate the country and to unify it.

According to the Moroccan historian Abdallah Laroui, when al-Fassi first advanced his irredentist claims, most younger leaders showed little interest. In part because of his charisma, however, these claims gradually gained the support of the wider Moroccan government.

=== Women's rights ===
Al-Fassi set out his views on women in the final section of Self-Criticism, entitled "Social Thought". There, he presented the nuclear family as the basic unit of the nation, addressed the perceived threat of prostitution, defended the treatment of women under Islamic law in contrast to Berber customary law, and proposed reforms concerning polygamy and divorce. Many contemporary Moroccan feminists have regarded al-Fassi as a leading advocate of women's emancipation in the country. as he supported the emancipation of women. However, he viewed the liberation of women as part of the liberation of the entire nation from colonialism rather than the domestic patriarchy. He supported women's education and employment because he believed it would positively impact Morocco's economic development. He also still maintained patriarchal ideas about women's and men's roles in society. He called for a ban on polygamy, not because he believed it harmed women, but because he considered it damaging to the image of modern Islam. Despite serving as chairman of the commission responsible for codifying the Mudawana, al-Fassi's comparatively liberal views on women were not incorporated into the code.

=== On Jews and Zionism ===
Al-Fassi opposed the migration of Moroccan Jews into Israel saying "This would be to offer hundreds of rich and healthy Zionists to Israel in order to inhabit an Arab land and make war against our Arab brothers: our indulgence has its limits!"

Al-Fassi while he was a government minister denied the Moroccan identity of Jews in Morocco:

He who says Moroccan, says Muslim. Moroccan nationality was created by the French Protectorate. All Moroccans are Muslim: the 'Moroccan' Jew is only a dhimmi.

Two years later, critiquing the Moroccan government's rapprochement with Israel, he said "Morocco is a Jewish State. It is led by Jews and foreigners."

== Literature ==
In 1925, al-Fassi published his first book of poems. In total, he wrote 45 books and articles. A library made up of his manuscripts, printed work and archives related to his work is located in Rabat in The Fondation Allal al-Fassi. Some ofal-Fassi's works include:

- Madkhal fī al-naẓariyya al-ʿāmma li-dirāsat al-fiqh al-Islāmī wamuqāranatuhu bi-l-fiqh al-ajnabī (Rabat: Muʾassasat ʿAllāl al-Fāsī, 1985), 148–50.
- "Munāqashat al-mīzāniyya al-farʿiyya li-wizārat al-ʿadl." In al-Adāʾ al-barlamānī lil-zaʿīm ʿAllāl al-Fāsī. Rabat: Muʾassasat ʿAllāl al-Fāsī, 2010.
- Rasāʾil tashhad ʿalā l-tarīkh. Rabat: Muʾassasat ʿAllāl al-Fāsī, 2006.
- Al-Ḥarakāt al-Istiqlāliyya fī l-Maghrib al-ʿArabī. Sixth Edition. Casablanca: Muʾassasat ʿAllāl al-Fāsī, 2003.
  - Translated as "The Independence Movements in Arab North Africa" by Hazem Zaki Nuseibeh.
- Al-Taqrīb: Sharḥ Mudawwanat al-Aḥwāl al-Shakhṣiyya al-kitābān al-awwal wa-l-thānī. Rabat: Muʾassasat ʿAllāl al-Fāsī, 2000.
- Difāʿan ʿan al-Sharīʿa (In Defence of Shariʿa). Second Edition. Beirut: Manshūrāt al-ʿAṣr al-Ḥadīth, 1972.
- Al-Naqd al-Dhātī (Self Criticism) Rabat: Matba'at al-Risala, 1979.
  - Problématique d'une pensée contemporaine. (translated excerpt of al-Naqd al-Dhātī, pp. 81–91) in A. Abdel-Malek, Anthologie de la littérature arabe contemporaine: les essays. Paris: Seuil, 1965.
- Défense de la Loi Islamique. Translated by Charles Samara. Casablanca: L'Imprimerie Eddar el Beida, 1977.
- Al-ʿAlāqah bayn al-Falsafah wa bayn al-Dīn Hasab Kutub al-Tahāfut al-Thalathah. (The relationship between philosophy and religion based on the books Al-Tahāfut al-Thalathah) Da'wat al-Ḥaqq 1 (January 1958): 4-11.
- Al-ʿAmal fī al-Islām. (Work in Islam) Al-Īmām 1 (February 1964): 23-29.
- ʿAqīdah wa Jihād. (Faith and struggle) Rabat: Al-Mațbaʿah al-Iqtiṣādiyyah, 1960.
- Badīl al-Badīl. (The alternative of the alternative) Casablanca: Dār al-Kītab, n.d.
- Dāʾiman maʿa al-Shaʿb. (Always with the people) Rabat: Maṭbaʿat al-Umniyyah, n.d.
- Al-Daʿwat al-Islāmiyyah. (Islamic missionary work) Al-Īmām 2 (June 1965): 6-11.
- Défense de la Loi Islamique. Translated by Charles Samara. Casablanca: L'Imprimerie Eddar el Beida, 1977.
- Difāʿan ʿan al-Aṣālah. (Defending authenticity) Rabat: Maṭbaʿat al-ʿUmniyyah, n.d.
- Al-Dīmuqrāṭiyyah Khulq. (Democracy is a moral) Al-Bayyinnah 1 (December 1962): i-iii.
- Faʿāliyyat al-Lughah al-ʿArabiyyah. (The effectiveness of the Arabic language) Al-Lisān al-ʿArabī 3 (August 1965): 8-26.
- Fī al-Badʾ kānat al-Kalimah. ("In the Beginning it was Words") Al-Bayyinnah 1 (June 1962): 3-6.
- Ḥadīth al-Maghrib fī al-Mashriq. (The Story of East and West) Cairo: al-Maṭbaʿah al-ʿĀlamiyyah, 1956.
  - "al-Ḥaraka al-Salafiyya fī l-Maghrib." In Ḥadīth al-Maghrib fī l-Mashriq. Cairo: al-Maṭbaʿa al-ʿĀlamiyya, 1956.
- Hal al-Islām fī Ḥājah ʾilā Falsafah? (Does Islam need philosophy?) Part 1. Al-Īmām 1 (December 1963): 8-12; Part 2. Al-Imām 1 (January 1964): 21-28.
- Ḥasanatayn. (Two good deeds) Al-Īmām 1 (June–July 1964): 24-29.
- Insāniyyah al-Muslimīn. (Muslim humanity) Al-Bayyinnah 2 (January 1963): 3-5.
- Al-Islām wa Nazariyyat Jaysīl (Gesell). (Islam and Gesell's Theory) Daʿwat al-Ḥaqq 3 (April 1959): 6-8.
- Al-Istiʿmār al-Lughawī. (Linguistic colonization) Al-Bayyinnah 1 (October 1962): 3-5.
- Kasr al-Ḥājiz. (Breaking the barrier) Al-Bayyinnah 2 (February 1963): 3-5.
- Al-Khuṭūṭ al-Sharʿiyyah. (The legal ways) Al-Bayyinnah 1 (October 1962): 77-101.
- Lā Shuyūʿiyyah wa lā Raʾsmāliyyah. (Neither communism nor capitalism) Daʿwat al-Ḥaqq 1 (August 1957): 7 + 24.
- Maʿrakat Wādī al-Makhāzin. (Fight of the Makhāzin River) Rabat: Maṭbaʿat al-Risālah, 1978.
- Maʿrakat al-Yawm wa al-Ghad. (Fight of today and tomorrow) Rabat: n.p., 1965.
- Manhaj al-Istiqlāliyyah. (Ideology of the Istiqlāl) Rabat: Maṭbaʿat al-Risālah, 1962.
- Maqāṣid al-Sharīʿa al-Islāmiyyah wa Makārimuhā. (Objectives of the sharīʿa and its noble characteristics) Casablanca: Maṭbaʿat al-Waḥdah Al-ʿArabiyyah, n.d.
- "Le Mariage Mixte." In Écrivains Marocains. Du Protectorate à 1965. Anthologie. Translated by Mohammed Ben-Jelloun. Paris: Sinbad, 1974, p. 66-69.
- The Mediterranean Civilization. New Outlook 2 (November 1958): 43-45.
- "Mission of the Islamic ʿUlema". Translated by Hassan Abdin Mohammed. In I. Zartman, Man, State, and Society in the Contemporary Maghrib. London: Pall Mall, 1973, p. 151-158.
- Muqadimāt li Dirāsāt Taʾrīkh al-Tashrīʿ al-Islāmī (Introduction to the studies of the history of Islamic principles) Part 1. Al-Bayyinah 1 (September 1962): 60-86; Part 2. Al-Bayyinah 2 (February 1963): 74-97.
- Mustaqbal al-Lughah al-ʿArabiyyah. (The future of the Arabic language) Part 1. Al-Bayyinah 2 (January 1963): 109-121; Part 2, Al-Bayyinah 2 (February 1963): 74-97.
- Nashʾat al-Fikr al-Islāmī al-Ḥadīth. (Birth of modern Islamic thought). Al-Īmān 2 (April 1965): 7-17.
- Nidāʾ al-Qāhirah. (Voice of Cairo) Rabat: Al-Maṭbaʿah al-Iqtiṣādiyyah, n.d.
- Al-Niẓām al-Qaḍāʾī. (The judiciary system) Al-Bayyinah 1 (November 1962): 103-123.
- Notre plan pour la réforme de l'enseignement: memorandum présenté par le parti de l'Istiqlal en réponse à la consultation royale sur les problèmes de l'enseignement. (Août 1966). Bulletin économique et social du Maroc 143-4 (1981): 279-285.
- Al-Qaḍāʾ baʿd al-Istiqlāl. (Justice after independence) Al-Bayyinah 1 (December 1962): 82-106.
- Qaḍāyā al-Ḥurriyyah al-Dīniyyah. (The question of religious freedom). Al-Īmān 1 (April 1964): 33-41.
- Qaḍiyyat al-Muslimīn al-ʿŪlā. (The paramount issues of Muslims). Al-Bayyinah 1 (September 1962): i–iii.
- Quwwat al-Ḥaqq. (Power of truth). Al-Bayyinah 1 (November 1962): i–iii.
- Al-Ṣawm. (Fasting) Al-Īmān 2 (March 1965): 51-54.
- Al-Shaykh Muḥammad ʿAbduh. (Shaikh Muhammad ʿAbduh) Part 1. Daʿwat al-Ḥaqq 1 (March 1958): 1-9; Part 2. Daʿwat al-Ḥaqq 1 (April 1958): 18-27.

=== Self-Criticism ===
Self-Criticism (Al-Naqd al-Dhātī), published in 1952, has been described as his "most deeply thoughtful and original work" by the scholar Abdessamad Belhaj and "magnum opus" by the scholar Mohammed Hashas. It served as a guide to a would-be independent Morocco and its youth and elites. Self-Criticism was dedicated to his belief in the reform of the Moroccan mind as he believed authentic Islam had been corrupted by despotism, colonialism, and ignorance. In this book, he presented a blueprint of an Islamic state and society based in the movement of Muhammad Abduh.

== Personal life ==
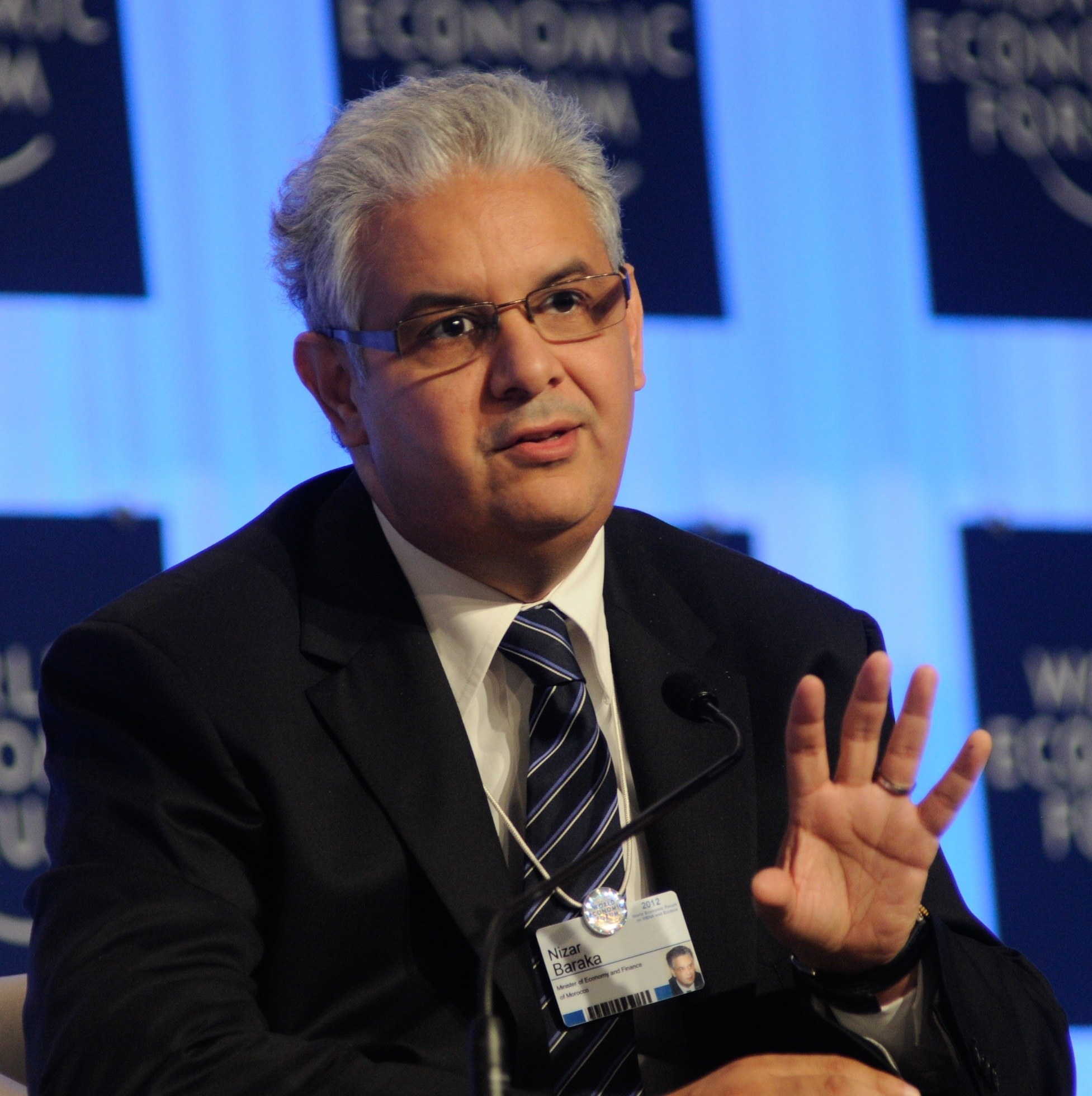
Nizar Baraka, Secretary-General of the Istiqlal and al-Fassi's grandson

The extended al-Fassi family are found throughout prominent positions in government, the economy, and media in Morocco. The al-Fassi family is specifically very influential in the Istiqlal Party. Al-Fassi's cousins were involved in the nationalist movement and post-independence politics alongside him. Mohamed El Fassi, for example, was the Minister of Education and played a key role in the North African Muslim Students Association. He was married to another cousin Malika al-Fassi, a prominent nationalist spokeswoman who was the only female signatory of the Independence Manifesto. Another cousin, Abd al-Kabir al-Fassi, was a leader of the Moroccan Army of Liberation. Al-Fassi's wife was also involved in politics collecting jewellery to sell in support of the war effort of the Arab-Israeli War.

Al-Fassi had 5 children:

- Um al-Mabneen al-Fassi; She married Secretary-General of the Istiqlal, Abbas El Fassi.
- Awatif al-Fassi; She married member of the Istiqlal until his expulsion in 2013, Mohamed El Ouafa.
- Hani al-Fassi.
- Leila al-Fassi; She is the mother of minister Nizar Baraka.
- Abdelouahed al-Fassi; he was a candidate for leadership in 2012.

Despite his support for Arabisation and Islam, al-Fassi educated his children in francophone secular schools. His first-born son became a cardiologist.

== See also ==
- Allal al Fassi Dam
- Mohammed al-Mokhtar Soussi
- Abdesalam Bennuna
- Muhammad al-Hajwi

== Sources ==
- Ashford, Douglas Elliott (2015-12-08). Political Change in Morocco. Princeton University Press. ISBN 978-1-4008-7850-5.
- Boutieri, Charis (2016-04-18). Learning in Morocco: Language Politics and the Abandoned Educational Dream. Indiana University Press. ISBN 978-0-253-02050-5.
- Fenner, Sofia (2023-07-11). Shouting in a Cage: Political Life After Authoritarian Co-optation in North Africa. Columbia University Press. ISBN 978-0-231-55750-4.
- Howe, Marvine (2005-06-30). Morocco: The Islamist Awakening and Other Challenges. Oxford University Press. ISBN 978-0-19-534698-5.
- Johnston, David L. (2007-09-17). "ʿAllāl al-Fāsī: Sharīʿa as a Blueprint for Righteous Citizenship". In Amanat, Abbas; Griffel, Frank (eds.). Shari'a: Islamic Law in the Contemporary Context. Stanford University Press. pp. 83–104. ISBN 978-0-8047-5639-6.
- Lauzière, Henri (2005). "Post-Islamism and the Religious Discourse of ʿAbd al-Salam Yasin". International Journal of Middle East Studies. 37 (2): 241–261. doi:10.1017/S0020743805372059. ISSN 0020-7438. JSTOR 3879730.
- Lauzière, Henri (2015-11-17). The Making of Salafism: Islamic Reform in the Twentieth Century. Columbia University Press. ISBN 978-0-231-54017-9.
- Miller, Susan Gilson (2013-04-15). A History of Modern Morocco. Cambridge University Press. ISBN 978-0-521-81070-8.
- Mogilski, Sara (2006). French influence on a 20th century 'Ālim : 'Allal al-Fāsī and his ideas toward legal reform in Morocco (Thesis). McGill University.
- Pennell, C. R. (2000). Morocco Since 1830: A History. Hurst. ISBN 978-1-85065-273-1.
- Sater, James (2016-06-09). Morocco: Challenges to tradition and modernity. Routledge. ISBN 978-1-317-57397-5.
- Schriber, Ari (2024-11-04). "Allal al-Fassi: Visions of Shariʿa in Post-Colonial Moroccan State Law". In Hashas, Mohammed (ed.). Contemporary Moroccan Thought: On Philosophy, Theology, Society, and Culture. Brill. ISBN 978-90-04-51953-4.
- Wyrtzen, Jonathan (2016-01-05). Making Morocco: Colonial Intervention and the Politics of Identity. Cornell University Press. ISBN 978-1-5017-0425-3.
