= Mohamed El Fassi =

Moroccan politician and scholar

Mohammad Al-Fasi
- Born: 1908
- Died: 1991 (aged 82–83)
- Education: Paris-Sorbonne University
- Occupations: politician, writer, researcher and historian

Mohamed El Fassi (Arabic: محمد الفاسي) (born 1908 AD, Fez – died 1991 AD) was a Moroccan politician, writer, and Researcher. Mohamed El Fassi is among the signatories of the 11 January document calling for the independence of Morocco. He is the first Minister of Education of Morocco after independence, and also the first Minister of Education in the history of Morocco

== Career ==
The politician and researcher Mohamed El Fassi was born in 1908 in the city of Fez, and began his education there, then joined France and obtained a license from the Sorbonne University, Then a postgraduate diploma from the Institute of Oriental Studies in Paris, and it was imbued with the spirit of patriotism, and the defense of Morocco's issues against French colonialism, So he and a group of his fellow students founded an association to defend his country's case, and with them was one of the founders of the magazine "Maghreb" Morocco, in coordination with the French sympathizers of the national case, He also participated in establishing the North African Students Association, which had a great role in educating young people. After that, he met Prince Chakib Arslan and cooperated with him in defending the Arab case and the Moroccan case in particular.

== Positions held before independence ==
- A professor in Casablanca, and Moulay Youssef High School in Rabat.
- Professor at the Institute for Higher Studies, and the Mawlawi Institute established by the late Muhammad V to educate princes.
- Director of Al-Qarawiyyin University.

== Positions held after independence ==
- Minister of National Education, Youth and Sports in 1955.
- President of the Moroccan University and Scientific Research in 1958 AD.
- Chairman of the Executive Board of UNESCO from 1958 to 1966.
- Member of the Royal Court.

== Books ==
Among the books and investigations of Professor Mohamed El Fassi:

- Flowers of the orchards in the news of Andalusia and Morocco during the era of the Almoravids and the Almohads, by Jean Giro and Tara – Arabization – with the participation of Ahmed Bela Freej.
- Muhammad ibn Uthman al-Meknasi Pages from the history of the West in the eighteenth century.
- Abu al-Abbas al-Jarawi poet of the Almohad caliphate.
- Moroccan folk literature (Al-Malhoun).
- Anas al-Faqir and Izz al-Haqeer by Abu al-Abbas bin Qunfid – investigation.
- The elixir in the jaws of the captive by Ibn Othman al-Meknasi – investigation .
- Anas Al-sari and the sire from the countries of the Maghreb to the end of hopes, interests, non-Arabs and Arabs by Ibn Malih al-Sarraj – investigation.
- The Moroccan Journey (The Journey of Al-Abdari) – An investigation and commentary.
- رباعيات نساء فاس: العروبيات [Rubayat of Fassi Women] (in Arabic and Moroccan Arabic). 1971. p. 133.

== Death ==
El Fassi died in 1991.
