= Gonzalo Fernández Parrilla =

Spanish scholar and translator (born 1950)

Gonzalo Fernández Parrilla is a noted Spanish scholar and translator of Arabic literature. Since 2006, he has taught at the Autonomous University of Madrid, but he has also collaborated and taught at the Abdelmalek Essaâdi University in Tangier, the Saint Joseph University in Lebanon, the University of California, Berkeley, and the University of Castilla–La Mancha where he worked for more than a decade.

He has written a history of modern Moroccan literature entitled La literatura marroquí contemporánea. He is also the editor of a number of books of literary scholarship and criticism. He is the director of Memorias del Mediterráneo, a series of works of Arabic literature published in Spanish translation by Ediciones del Oriente y del Mediterráneo.

He served on the judging panel of the 2012 Arabic Booker Prize.
