= List of Moroccan writers =

This is a list of writers from Morocco.

== Twentieth century ==
=== A ===
- Eliette Abécassis (born 1969)
- Leila Abouzeid (born 1950)
- Mohammed Achaari (born 1951)
- Said Achtouk (died 1989)
- Issa Aït Belize
- Lotfi Akalay (1943–2019)
- Malika El Assimi (born 1946)
- Mohammed Akoujan
- Mehdi Akhrif (born 1952)
- Mohammed ibn Mohammed Alami (1932–1993)
- Mohamed Métalsi (born 1954), urbanist and architectural historian
- Idriss ibn al-Hassan al-Alami (1925–2007)
- Ahmad al-Tayyeb Aldj (1928–2012)
- Tewfik Allal (born 1947)
- Farid al-Ansari (1960–2009)
- Najib El Aoufi (born 1948)
- Robert Assaraf (1936–2018)
- Nabil Ayouch (born 1969)
- Ali Azaykou (1942–2004)

=== B ===
- Hassan Bahara (born 1978), Moroccan-Dutch writer
- Souad Bahéchar (born 1953)
- Latifa Baka (born 1964)
- Muriel Barbery (born 1969)
- Laarbi Batma (1948–1998)
- Hafsa Bekri-Lamrani
- Abdelmalek Belghiti (1906–2010)
- Abdeslam Benabdelali
- Abdelkader Benali (born 1975)
- Mehdi Ben Barka (1920–1965)
- Zoubeir Ben Bouchta
- Halima Ben Haddou (born 1954)
- Tahar Ben Jelloun (born 1944)
- Siham Benchekroun
- Ahmed Benchemsi
- Rajae Benchemsi (born 1957)
- Esther Bendahan (born 1964)
- Abdelmajid Benjelloun (1919–1981)
- Abdelmajid Benjelloun (born 1944)
- Abdelwahab Benmansour (1920–13 November 2008)
- Abdelouahid Bennani (born 1958)
- Mohammed Suerte Bennani (born 1961)
- Mohammed Bennis (born 1948)
- Khnata Bennouna (born 1940)
- Mohammed Benzakour (born 1972)
- Mohammed Berrada (born 1938)
- Hafsa Bikri (born 1948)
- Mahi Binebine (born 1959)
- Mohammed Ibrahim Bouallou (1936–2024)
- Ali Bourequat
- Hassan Bourkia (born 1956)
- Ahmed Bouzfour (born 1954)
- Al-Yazid al-Buzidi Bujrafi (1925–2011)

=== C ===
- Mohamed Chafik (born 1926)
- Nadia Chafik (born 1962)
- Abdelkader Chaoui (born 1950)
- Driss Ben Hamed Charhadi (1937–1986)
- Abdelkader Chatt (1904–1992)
- Mohamed Choukri (1935–2003)
- Driss Chraïbi (1926–2007)

=== D ===
- Mohammed Daoud (1901–1984)
- Zakya Daoud (born 1937)
- Mohammed Ben Abdelaziz Debbarh (1928–2008)
- Farida Diouri (1953–2004)

=== E ===
- Youssouf Amine Elalamy (born 1961)
- Mahdi Elmandjra (1933–2014)

=== F ===
- Youssef Fadel (born 1949)
- Allal al-Fassi (1910–1974)
- Malika al-Fassi (1920–2007)
- Halima Ferhat (born 1941)
- Mohammed al-Habib al-Fourkani (1922–2008)

=== G ===
- Abdelkrim Ghallab (1919–2006)
- Abd al-Aziz al-Ghumari (1920–1997)
- Abdullah al-Ghumari (1910–1993)
- Ahmad al-Ghumari (1902–1961)
- Abdallah Guennoun (1910–1989)
- Soumya Naâmane Guessous

=== H ===
- Mohammed Aziz El-Hababi (1922–1993)
- Mouna Hachim (born 1967)
- Najat El Hachmi (born 1979)
- Ali Haddani (1936–2007)
- Abdul Salam Al Haras (1930-2015)
- Badia Hadj Nasser (born 1938)
- Allal El Hajjam (born 1948)
- Mohammed Hajuji (died 1952)
- Mohammed El Haloui (1923–2004)
- Mohammed al-Harradi
- Ahmed Harrak Srifi (died 1925)
- Muhammad al-Hajwi (died 1956)
- Ben Salem Himmich (born 1947)
- Emmanuel Hocquard (1940–2019)
- Ali Squalli Houssaini (1932–2018)

=== J ===
- Mohammed Abed al-Jabri (1936–2010)
- Salim Jay (born 1951)
- Abbas al-Jirari (1937–2024)
- Abderrafi Jouahri (born 1943)
- Abdelkarim Jouiti (born 1962)
- Ahmed Joumari (1939–1995)

=== K ===
- Maati Kabbal (born 1954)
- Mohammed Kaghat (1942–2001)
- Mohammed Khaïr-Eddine (1941–1995)
- Mohammed Khammar Kanouni (1938–1991)
- Abdelkebir Khatibi (1938–2009)
- Rita El Khayat (born 1944)
- Driss El Khouri (1939–2022)
- Abdelfattah Kilito (born 1945)
- Driss Ksikes (born 1968)

=== L ===
- Abdellatif Laabi (born 1942)
- Abdelrahim Lahbibi (born 1950)
- Mohammed Aziz Lahbabi (1922–1993)
- Amina Lahbabi-Peters
- Leila Lahlou
- Laila Lalami (born 1968)
- Wafaa Lamrani (born 1960)
- Abdallah Laroui (born 1933)
- Fouad Laroui (born 1958)
- Mohammed Leftah (1946–2008)
- Ahmed Lemsih (born 1950)
- Ali Lmrabet (born 1959)

=== M ===
- Mustafa Maadawi (1937–1961)
- Ahmed al-Madini (born 1949)
- Edmond Amran El Maleh (1917–2010)
- Zahra Mansouri
- Khadija Marouazi, (born 1961)
- Ahmed Mejjati (1936–1995)
- Driss El Meliani
- Saida Menebhi (1952–1977)
- Fatima Mernissi (1940–2015)
- Abderrahmane El Moudden
- Omar Mounir
- Khireddine Mourad (born 1950)
- Malika Moustadraf (1969–2006)
- Mohammed El-Moustaoui (born 1943)
- Mouad Moutaoukil (born 1997)
- Mohamed Mrabet (born 1936)

=== N ===
- Mririda n'Ait Attik (c. 1900 – c. 1930)
- Mohammed al-Makki al-Nasiri (1906–1994)
- Mohamed Nedali (born 1962)
- Mostafa Nissaboury (born 1943)

=== O ===
- Rachid O (born 1970)
- Salah El-Ouadie (born 1952)
- Mohammed Hassan El Ouazzani (1910–1978)
- Malika Oufkir (born 1953)
- Touria Oulehri

=== Q ===
- Bachir Qamari (1951–2021)

=== R ===
- Mubarak Rabi (born 1938)
- Mohamed Said Raihani (born 1968)
- Fouzia Rhissassi
- Najima Rhozali (born 1960)

=== S ===
- Mohammed Sabbag (born 1930)
- Mohammed Sabila
- Abdeldjabbar Sahimi (born 1938)
- Abdelhadi Said (born 1974)
- Amale Samie (1954–2018)
- Thouria Saqqat (1935–1992)
- Tayeb Seddiki (1938–2016)
- Ahmed Sefrioui (1915–2004)
- Mohamed Serghini (born 1930)
- Abdelhak Serhane (born 1950)
- Mohamed Sibari (1945–2013)
- Hourya Sinaceur
- Mohammed Allal Sinaceur (born 1941)
- Ali Siqli (born 1932)
- Faouzi Skali (born 1953)
- Mohammed al-Mokhtar Soussi (1900–1963)

=== T ===
- Abdelkarim Tabbal (born 1931)
- Abdellah Taïa (born 1973)
- Boutaina Tawil
- Abdelhadi Tazi (1921–2015)
- Mohammed Azeddine Tazi (born 1948)
- Mahjoub Tobji (born 1942)
- Abdelkhalek Torres (1910–1970)
- Ahmed Toufiq (born 1943)
- Houcine Toulali (1924–1998)
- Bahaa Trabelsi (born 1968)

=== W ===
- Tuhami al-Wazzani (1903–1972)

=== Y ===
- Said Yaktine (born 1955)
- Yasser Harrak (born 1976) writer, commentator and founder of the Middle East Seminar forum.
- Nadia Yassine (born 1958)

=== Z ===
- Haim Zafrani (1922–2004)
- Mohamed Zafzaf (1942–2001)
- Mohammed Zniber (1923–1993)
- Abdallah Zrika (born 1953)

== Nineteenth century ==
- Mohammed ibn Abu al-Qasim al-Sijilmasi (died 1800)
- Mohammed ibn Abd as-Salam ibn Nasir (died 1824)
- Mohammed Ibn Amr (died 1827)
- Ali Barrada al-Fasi Harazim (died 1856)
- Thami Mdaghri (died 1856)
- Idriss al-Amraoui (died 1879)
- Mohammed Gannun (died 1885)
- Abu Hassan Ali Mahmud al-Susi al-Simlali (died 1894)
- Ahmad ibn Hamdun ibn al-Hajj (died 1898)
- Mohammed al-Tahir al-Fasi (1830–1868)
- Abd as-Salam al-Alami (1834–1895)
- Ahmad ibn Khalid al-Nasiri (1835–1897)
- Salomon Berdugo (1854–1906)
- Muhammad ibn al-Qasim al-Badisi (d. 1922)
- Mohammed ibn Jaafar al-Kattani (1858–1927)
- Mohammed Slimani (1863–1926)
- Ibn Zaydan (1873–1946)
- Mohammed Skirej (1875–1965)
- Muhammad Ibn al-Habib (1876–1972)
- Ahmed Skirej (1878–1944)
- Abdelkrim al-Khattabi (1882–1963)
- Mohammed Boujendar (1889–1926)
- Abd Allah al-Muwaqqit al-Marrakushi (1894–1949)
- Mohammed Ben Brahim (1897–1955)

== Eighteenth century ==
- Mohammed ibn abd al-Wahab al-Ghassani (died 1707)
- Mohammed ibn Qasim ibn Zakur (died 1708)
- Mohammed ibn al-Tayyib al-Alami (died 1722)
- Hasan ibn Rahlal al-Madani (died 1728)
- Abd al-Qadir ibn Shaqrun (died after 1727/8)
- Mohammed ibn Zakri al-Fasi (died 1731)
- Ahmed ibn al-Mubarak al-Lamti al-Sijilmasi (died 1741)
- Khnata bent Bakkar (died 1754)
- Ibn al-Wannan (died 1773)
- Ahmed al-Ghazzal (died 1777)
- Abd Allah ibn Azzuz (died 1789)
- Mohammed ibn Uthman al-Miknasi (died 1799)
- Mohammed al-Qadiri (1712–1773)
- David Hassine (1722–1792)
- Abu al-Qasim al-Zayyani (1734–1833)
- Kaddour El Alamy (1742–1850)
- Mohammed al-Ruhuni (1746–1815)
- Raphael Berdugo (1747–1821)
- Sulayman al-Hawwat (1747–1816)
- Ahmad ibn Ajiba (1747–1809)
- Mohammed al-Duayf (born 1752)
- Mohammed al-Tayyib ibn Kiran (1758–1812)
- Muhammad al-Arabi al-Darqawi (1760–1823)
- Hamdun ibn al-Hajj al-Fasi (1760–1817)
- Ahmad ibn Idris al-Fasi (1760–1837)
- Suleiman al-Alawi (1760–1822)
- Mohammed al-Harraq (1772–1845)
- Mohammed al-Haik (fl. 1790)
- Mohammed al-Tawdi ibn Suda (1790–1794/5)
- Ahmed al-Salawi (1791–1840)
- Mohammed ibn Idris al-Amrawi (1794–1847)
- Mohammed Akensus (1797–1877)
- Hemmou Talb (18th century)

== Seventeenth century ==
- Isaac Uziel (died 1622)
- Abd al-Rahman al-Tamanarti (died 1650)
- Abu Abdallah Mohammed al-Murabit al-Dila'i (died 1678)
- Mohammed ibn Nasir (1603–1674)
- Mohammed al-Mahdi al-Fasi (1624–1698)
- Mohammed al-Rudani (c. 1627–1683)
- Abu Salim al-Ayyashi (1628–1679)
- Abd al-Rahman al-Fasi (1631–1685)
- Abu Ali al-Hassan al-Yusi (1631–1691)
- Ahmed al-Hashtuki (1647–1715)
- Ahmed ibn Nasir (1647–1717)
- Abd as-Salam al-Qadiri (1648–1698)
- Abd al-Wahhab Adarrak (1666–1746)
- Mohammed Awzal (1670–1749)
- Mohammed al-Ifrani (1670–1745)
- Ahmed ibn al-Mubarak al-Lamati (1679–1743)
- Ali Misbah al-Zarwili (1685–1737)
- Mohammed ibn al-Tayyib (1698–1756)

== Sixteenth century ==
- Mohammed ibn Yajbash al-Tazi (died 1505, AH 920)
- Ali ibn Qasim al-Zaqqaq (died 1506)
- Abdallah al-Ghazwani (died 1529)
- Abderrahman El Majdoub (died 1569)
- Mahammad ibn Isa al-Sanhadji (died c. 1578)
- Abu-l-Hasan al-Tamgruti (died 1594/5)
- Ahmed al-Mandjur (1520–1587)
- Abu Abdallah ibn Askar (1529–1578)
- Abul Qasim ibn Mohammed al-Ghassani (1548–1610)
- Abd al-Aziz al-Fishtali (1549–1621)
- Ahmad Ibn al-Qadi (1553–1616)
- Ahmed ibn Abi Mahalli (1559–1613)
- Abraham Azulai (c. 1570 – 1643)
- Mohammed al-Arbi al-Fasi (1580–1642)
- Abdelaziz al-Maghrawi (c. 1580 – 1600)
- Abd al-Wahid ibn Ashir (1582–1631)
- Ahmed Mohammed al-Maqqari (c. 1591 – 1632)
- Mahamad Mayyara (1591–1662)
- Abd al-Qadir al-Fasi (1599–1680)
- Al-Masfiwi (16th century)

== Fifteenth century ==
- Abdarrahman al-Makudi (died 1405)
- Ali ibn Haydur at-Tadili (died 1413)
- Ibrahim al-Tazi (died CE 1462/AH 866)
- Muhammad al-Jazuli (died 1465)
- Ibrahim ibn Hilal al-Sijilmasi (died c. 1498)
- Ibn Ghazi al-Miknasi (1437–1513)
- Ahmad Zarruq (1442–1493)
- Leo Africanus (1488–1554)

== Fourteenth century ==
- Abu Mohammed al-Qasim al-Sijilmasi (died 1304)
- Ibn Abi Zar (died c. 1315)
- Abu al-Hassan Ali ibn Mohammed al-Zarwili (died 1319)
- Abd al-Haqq al-Badisi (died after 1322)
- Ibn Shuayb (died 1349)
- Ahmad ibn Ashir al-Ansari (died 1362)
- Ibn Idhari (beginning of the 14th century)
- Ibn Battuta (1304–1377)
- Mohammed al-Hazmiri (fl. 1320)
- Ibn Juzayy (1321–1357)
- Abu Muqri Mohammed al-Battiwi (fl. 1331)
- Ibn Abbad al-Rundi (1333–1390)
- Abu Yahya ibn al-Sakkak (1335–1415)
- Abd al-Rahman al-Jadiri (1375–1416)
- Ismail ibn al-Ahmar (1387–1406)
- Abu al-Hasan Ali al-Jaznai (14th century)

== Thirteenth century ==
- Ibn al-Yasamin (died 1204)
- Abu Musa al-Jazuli (died 1209)
- Ahmad ibn Munim al-Abdari (died 1228)
- Ibn al-Zayyat al-Tadili (died 1229/30)
- Abd al-Rahman al-Fazazi (died 1230)
- Ali ibn al-Qattan (died 1231)
- Ibn al-Khabbaza (died 1239)
- Abdelaziz al-Malzuzi (died 1298)
- Salih ben Sharif al-Rundi (1204–1285)
- Malik ibn al-Murahhal (1207–1289)
- Abu al-Qasim Qasim ibn al-Shatt (1245–1323)
- Ibn abd al-Malik al-Marrakushi (1237–1303)
- Mohammed ibn Hajj al-Abdari al-Fasi (c. 1256 – 1336)
- Ibn al-Banna al-Marrakushi (1256–1321)
- Mohammed ibn Rushayd (1259–1321)
- Abu al-Qasim al-Tujibi (1267/8–1329)
- Mohammed ibn Adjurrum (1273–1323)
- Abu al-Qasim al-Sharif al-Sabti (1297–1359 AH 697–760)
- Abu Ali al-Hasan al-Marrakushi (fl. 1281/2)
- Mohammed al-Abdari al-Hihi (fl. c. 1289)
- Judah ben Nissim (13th century)

== Twelfth century ==
- Ibn Bajjah (died 1138)
- Abu Jafar ibn Atiyya (died 1158)
- Ali ibn Harzihim (died 1163)
- Al-Suhayli (1114–1185)
- Zechariah Aghmati (1120–1195)
- Abu al-Abbas as-Sabti (1129–1204)
- Abu al-Abbas al-Jarawi (1133–1212)
- Abd as-Salam ibn Mashish (1140–1227)
- Mohammed ibn Qasim al-Tamimi (1140/5)
- Ibn Dihya al-Kalby (1149–1235)
- Mohammed al-Baydhaq (c. 1150)
- Abu Mohammed Salih (1153–1234)
- Joseph ben Judah of Ceuta (c. 1160–1226)
- Abu al-Abbas al-Azafi (1162–1236)
- Abdelwahid al-Marrakushi (born 1185)
- Abu-l-Hassan ash-Shadhili (1196–1258)
- Abu Bakr al-Hassar (12th century)

== Eleventh century ==
- Abu Imran al-Fasi (died 1038)
- Isaac Alfasi (1013–1103)
- Mohammed ibn Tumart (c. 1080 – 1130)
- Qadi Ayyad ben Moussa (1083–1149)
- Mohammed al-Idrisi (1099–1165)

== Tenth century ==
- Dunash ben Labrat (920–990)
- Judah ben David Hayyuj (945–1000)
- David ben Abraham al-Fasi (c. 950 – 1000)

== Ninth century ==
- Idriss II (791–828)

== See also ==
- List of Moroccan women writers
- African Writers Series
- Lists of authors
- List of African writers by country

== Bibliography ==
- Julie Scott Meisami and Paul Starkey (ed), Encyclopedia of Arabic Literature, London: Routledge, 1998 (Entry "Maghrib", p. 484)
- Encyclopedia of African Literature, ed Simon Gikandi, London: Routledge, 2003.
- The Cambridge History of African and Caribbean Literature, ed Abiola Irele and Simon Gikandi, 2 vls, Cambridge [u.a.]: Cambridge University Press, 2004.
- Encyclopaedia of Islam, edited by P.J. Bearman, Th. Bianquis, C.E. Bosworth, E. van Donzel and W.P. Heinrichs, Brill Publishers 2003
- Roger Allen and D.S. Richards (ed.), Arabic Literature in the Post-classical Period, Cambridge University Press, 2006 ISBN 978-0-521-77160-3
- Jacques Berque, "La Littérature Marocaine Et L'Orient Au XVIIe Siècle", in: Arabica, Volume 2, Number 3, 1955, pp. 295–312
- Gannun, Abd Allah, El genio marroquí en la literatura árabe / Abdal-lah Guennún al Hasani; traducido directamente del árabe y anotado por Jerónimo Carrillo Ordóñez y Mohammad Tayeddin Buzid, Publisher: [Tetuán] : Alta Comisaría de España en Marruecos, Delegación de Asuntos Indígenas, Centro de Estudios Marroquíes, 1939 (Artes Gráficas Boscá)
- Mohammed Lakhdar, La vie littéraire au Maroc sous la dynastie 'Alawide, Rabat, 1971
- Najala al-Marini, Al-Sh'ar al-Maghribi fi 'asr al-Mansur al-Sa'di, Rabat: Nashurat Kuliat al-Adab wa al-Alum al-Insania, 1999 (Analysis of the work of the main poets of the age of Ahmed al-Mansour)
- Monroe, J. T., Hispano-Arabic Poetry During the Almoravid Period: Theory and Practice, Viator 4, 1973, pp. 65–98
- Nasser S. Al-Samaany, Travel Literature of Moroccan Pilgrims during the 11-12th/17-18th Centuries: thematic and artistic study, PhD. thesis, University of Leeds, 2000
- Hasan al-Wazzani ed., Dalîl al-kuttâb al-magâriba. A' d:â´ Ittih:âd Kuttâb al-Magrib, Rabat: Manshűrât Ittih:âd Kuttâb al-Magrib, 1993
- Hasan al-Wazzani, Al-adab al-magribî al-h:adîth, 1929–1999, Casablanca: Dâr al-Thaqâfa, 2002
- Otto Zwartjes, Ed de Moor, e.a. (ed.) Poetry, Politics and Polemics: Cultural Transfer Between the Iberian Peninsula and North Africa, Rodopi, 1996, ISBN 90-420-0105-4
