= List of Moroccan women writers =

This is a list of women writers who were born in Morocco or whose writings are closely associated with that country.

== A ==
- Leila Abouzeid (born 1950), Arabic-language novelist
- Mririda n’Ait Attik (1900–1940s), poet in Tashelhit, translated into French

== B ==
- Latifa Baka (born 1964), novelist, short story writer
- Muriel Barbery (born 1969), Moroccan-born French novelist, educator
- Hafsa Bekri (born 1948), poet, short story writer, feminist writer
- Siham Benchekroun, since 1999, novelist, poet, short story writer
- Rajae Benchemsi (born 1957), poet, essayist, novelist
- Esther Bendahan (born 1964), Moroccan-born Spanish non-fiction writer, novelist
- Khnata Bennouna (born 1940), novelist, short story writer

== C ==
- Nadia Chafik (born 1962), novelist, non-fiction writer, educator
- Aïcha Chenna (1941–2022), non-fiction writer

== D ==
- Zakya Daoud (born 1937 as Jacqueline Loghlam), French-born Moroccan journalist, magazine editor, non-fiction writer
- Farida Diouri (1953–2004), novelist
- Yvette Duval (1931–2006), Moroccan-born French historian specializing in ancient North Africa

== F ==
- Malika al-Fassi (1919–2007), journalist, playwright, novelist

== G ==
- Soumya Naâmane Guessous, since 1990, best selling non-fiction writer, sociologist, educator

== H ==
- Mouna Hachim (born 1967), journalist, fiction and non-fiction writer

== K ==
- Maguy Kakon (born 1953), non-fiction writer, women's rights activist
- Rita El Khayat (born 1944), psychiatrist, publisher, women's rights activist, non-fiction writer
- Khnata bent Bakkar (1668–1754), princess consort, biographer, letter writer

== L ==
- Leila Lahlou, author of the novel Do Not Forget God (1987)
- Laila Lalami (born 1968), Moroccan-American novelist, essayist
- Wafaa Lamrani (born 1960), poet

== M ==
- Saida Menebhi (1952–1977), poet, Marxist activist
- Fatema Mernissi (1940–2015), feminist writer, sociologist
- Malika Mezzane (born 1960), poet and novelist
- Malika Moustadraf (1969–2006), feminist writer

== N ==
- Mririda n’Ait Attik (c. 1900 – c. 1930s), Tashelhit language poet

== O ==
- Malika Oufkir (born 1953), memoirist, author of Stolen Lives: Twenty Years in a Desert Jail
- Touria Oulehri (1926–2011), novelist, critic

== R ==
- Fouzia Rhissassi (born 1947), educators, women's rights activist, non-fiction writer
- Najima Rhozali (born 1960), non-fiction writer, politician

== S ==
- Thouria Saqqat (1935–1992), children's writer
- Hourya Benis Sinaceur (born 1940), philosopher, non-fiction writer

== T ==
- Bahaa Trabelsi (born 1966), novelist, journalist, magazine editor

== See also ==
- List of women writers
- List of Moroccan writers
