= Sijilmasi =

Sijilmasi or Sijilmassi (in Arabic سجلماسي) sometimes with Al- (السجلماسي) added may refer to

- Ibrahim ibn Hilal al-Sijilmasi (d. 1498)
- Mohammed ibn Abu al-Qasim al-Sijilmasi (d. 1800)
- Ahmed ibn al-Mubarak al-Lamati al-Sijilmasi (d. 1743)
- Abu Mohammed al-Qasim al-Siljilmasi (d. 1304)
- Fathallah Sijilmassi, Moroccan politician and economist
