= Al-Bannani =

18th-century Moroccan Muslim jurist

al-Bannānī
- البناني
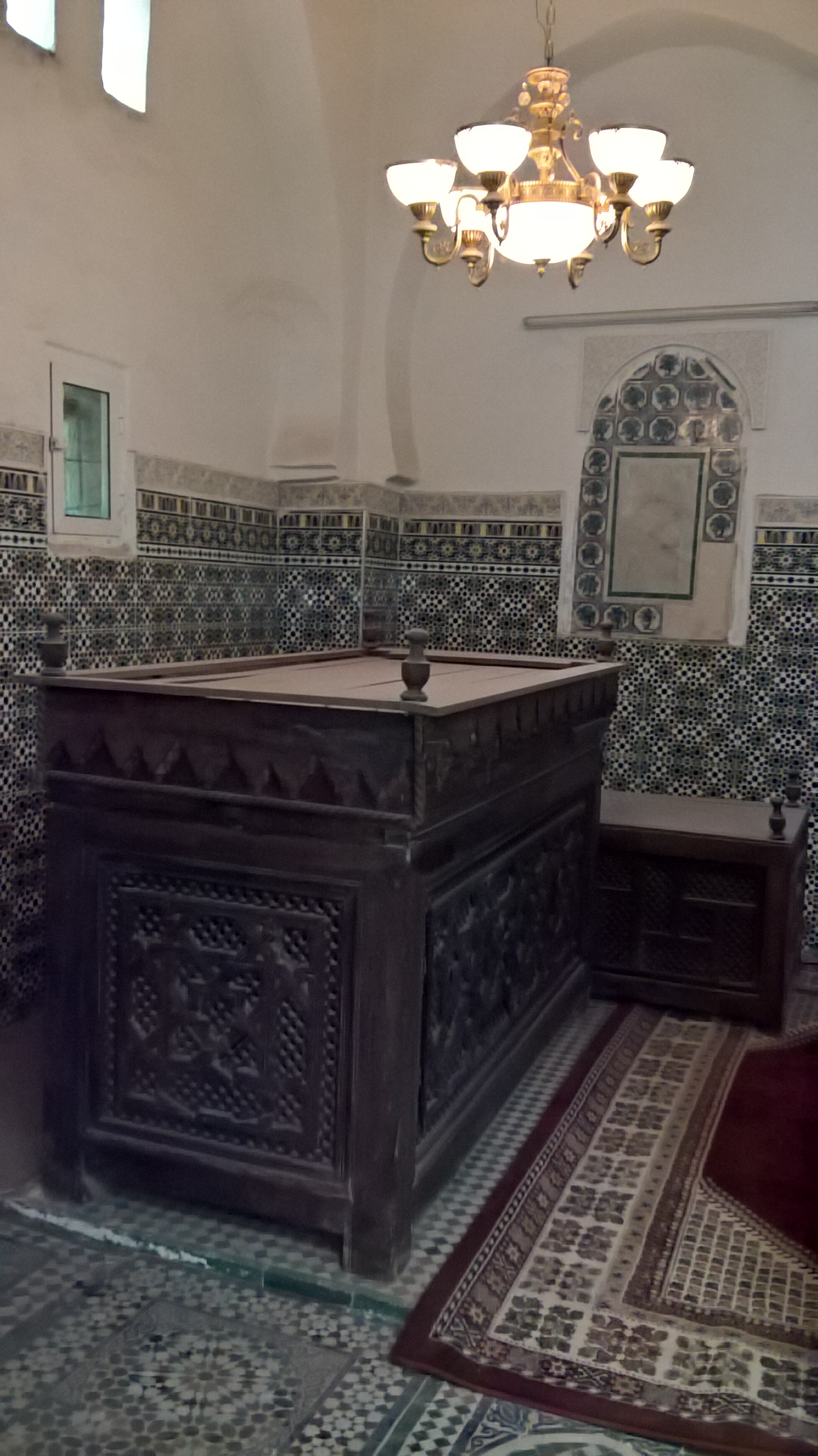
- Inside of al-Bannani's tomb

Personal life
- Born: 1727 CE (1133 AH) Fes, Morocco
- Died: 1780 CE (1194 AH) Fes, Morocco
- Era: Alaouite Morocco
- Main interest: Fiqh

Religious life
- Religion: Islam
- Jurisprudence: Maliki
- Arabic name
- Personal (Ism): Muḥammad
- Patronymic (Nasab): ibn al-Ḥasan ibn Masʿūd
- Teknonymic (Kunya): Abū ʿAbd Allāh
- Toponymic (Nisba): al-Bannānī

Sīdī Muḥammad ibn al-Ḥasan al-Bannānī (Arabic: محمد بن الحسن البناني; (Note: Full name: Abū ʿAbd Allāh Muḥammad ibn al-Ḥasan ibn Masʿūd al-Bannānī (Arabic: أبو عبد الله محمد بن الحسن بن مسعود البناني)) 1727 – 1780 CE/1133 AH – 1194 AH) more commonly referred to in books of Islamic law as al-Bannānī or Imam al-Bannānī, was an 18th-century Muslim jurist from Fes, Morocco, and a scholar in the Maliki school of Islamic jurisprudence (fiqh).

== Life ==
Muhammad ibn al-Hasan al-Bannani was born in Fes in 1727, a city where he studied, lived for his entire life and was also buried in. He came from the Bannani family, belonging to the social category of bildiyyīn ("people of the town"), who originally converted from Judaism to Islam in the 18th century. He studied under many of the scholars of his time including al-Tayyib al-Wazzani and the Sufi Ahmad ibn al-Mubarak (author of Kitab al-Ibriz). After a period of study, he became the imam and khatib of the Karaouine mosque and university and also taught there. He died in 1780 CE and was buried next to another scholar of Fes, Muhammad Mayyara, in the Darb at-Taweel cemetery near the Karaouine mosque.

Al-Bannani is known for his book Al-Fath ar-Rabbani (The Endowment of Divine Grace). The text is a sub-commentary on the classical Mukhtasar of Khalil (the main source of rulings in Maliki jurisprudence). He also wrote the following work:

- Ḥāshiyya ʿalā sharḥ az-Zaqqāq li-Mukhtaṣar Khalīl, a book of fiqh on Ali ibn Qasim al-Zaqqaq's work
- Sharḥ as-Sullam, a commentary on logic of as-Sullam al-marunuq fī ʿilm al-manṭiq, written on 1262/1845–6
- Manẓūma fī ʿilm al-ḥisāb, written about arithmetic
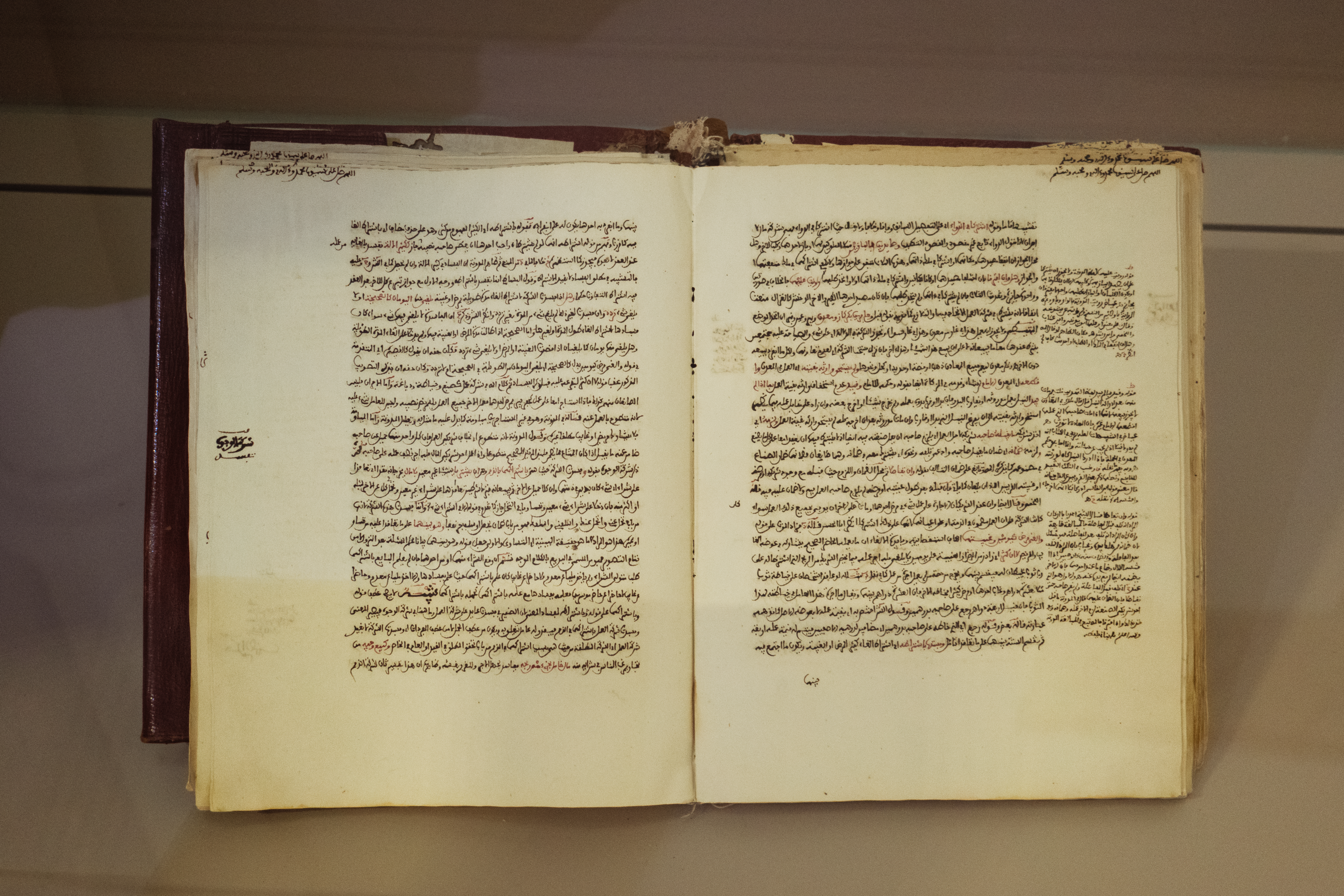
Manuscript of Al-Fath Al-Rabbani fi ma dahala 'anhu al-Zurqani, Islamic Calligraphy Museum of Tlemcen.

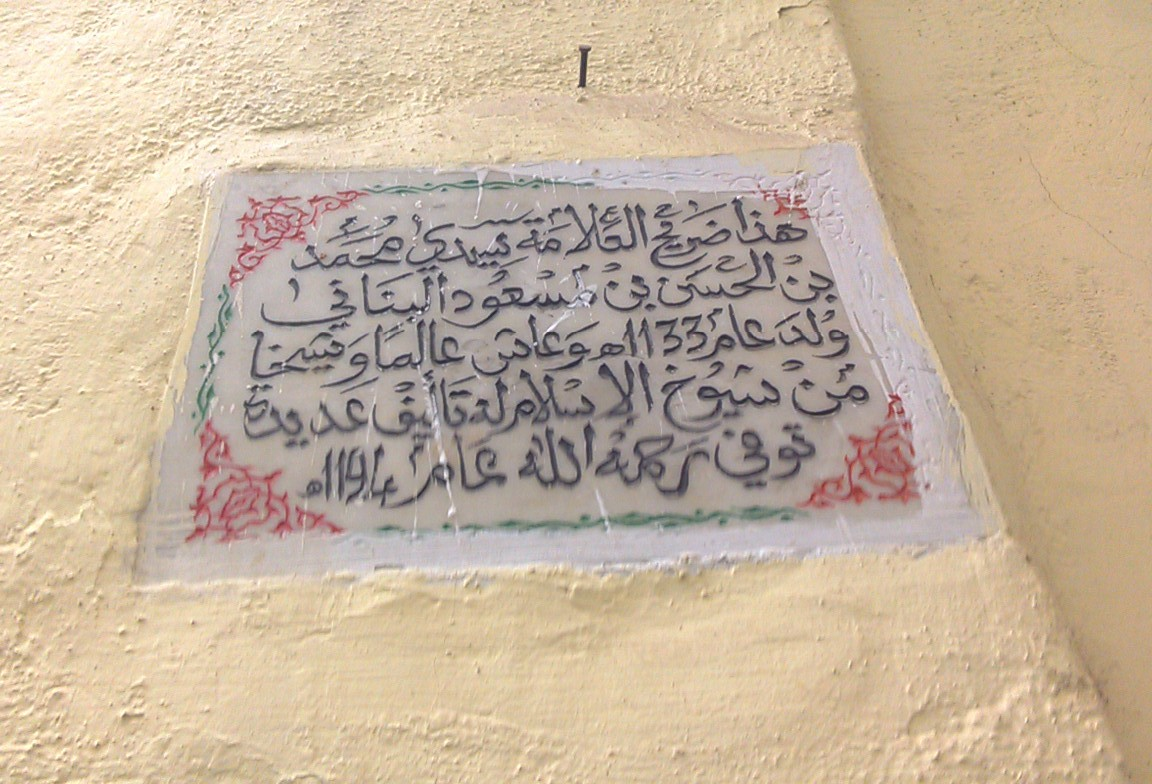
Inscription on the outside of Bannani's tomb in Fes.
