= Ibn al-Tayyib (disambiguation) =

Ibn al-Tayyib (died 1043) was a Nestorian priest, physician, theologian and philosopher.

Ibn al-Tayyib may also refer to:

- Ahmad ibn al-Tayyib al-Sarakhsi (died 899), Persian historian and philosopher
- al-Baqillani, fully Abu Bakr Muhammad ibn al-Tayyib al-Baqillani (940–1013), Islamic theologian
- Mohammed al-Qadiri, fully Mohammed ibn al-Tayyib al-Qadiri (1712–1773), Moroccan historian
- Mohammed ibn al-Tayyib (1698–1756), Moroccan scholar
