= Mouad =

Mouad is an Arabic given name. Notable people with the name include:

- Mouad Belghouat (born 1988), better known as L7a9d, Moroccan rapper and human rights activist
- Mouad Bouchareb (born 1978), Algerian politician
- Mouad Dahak (born 2005), Moroccan footballer
- Mouad Hadded (born 1997), Algerian footballer
- Mouad Hassan (born 1999), Djiboutian footballer
- Mouad Mohamed Ibrahim (born 1999), Qatari discus thrower
- Mouad Moutaoukil (born 1997), Moroccan writer
- Mouad Ouites (born 1996), Algerian karateka
- Mouad Zahafi (born 1998), Moroccan runner
