= Mohamed Leftah =

Moroccan novelist and literary critic

Mohamed Leftah (1946 – 20 July 2008) was a Moroccan novelist and literary critic who wrote in French. He wrote ten novels and worked for Matin du Sahara and Temps du Maroc.

== Biography ==
Leftah was born in 1946 in Settat, Morocco. He studied in Casablanca, then he entered a school of Public works engineers works, in Paris. He returned to Morocco, he became a computer scientist then a literary journalist at Le Matin du Sahara and Temps du Maroc. In 1990, he returned to France and began his novel writing career. In 1992, after the publication of Demoiselles de Numidie by Éditions de l'Aube. Salim Jay introduced him to Editions de La Différence. The publishing company published Au bonheur des limbes, Ambre ou les métamorphoses de l'amour, L'Enfant de marbre, Une fleur dans la nuit suivi de Sous le soleil et le clair de lune and Un martyr de notre temps. In 2000, he moved from Morocco to Cairo, Egypt.

== Death ==
He died at Sunday July 20 2008 in Cairo at the age of 62.
