= Mohammed ibn Amr =

Mohammed ibn Amr al-Ribati (Arabic: محمد بن عمر الرباطي) or Abu Abdallah Mohammed ibn Mohammed ibn Amr al-Ansari (died 1 October 1827) was a Moroccan poet from Rabat. He initially worked as a kadi in Rabat and, after 1809, as a teacher in Marrakesh. His works include a diwan, a fahrasa and a rihla which have only partially been preserved. His fame rests for a part on al-Amriyya, a kafiyya made in an imitation of the Shamakmakiyya of Ibn al-Wannan.
