= Ahmed Taib El Alj =

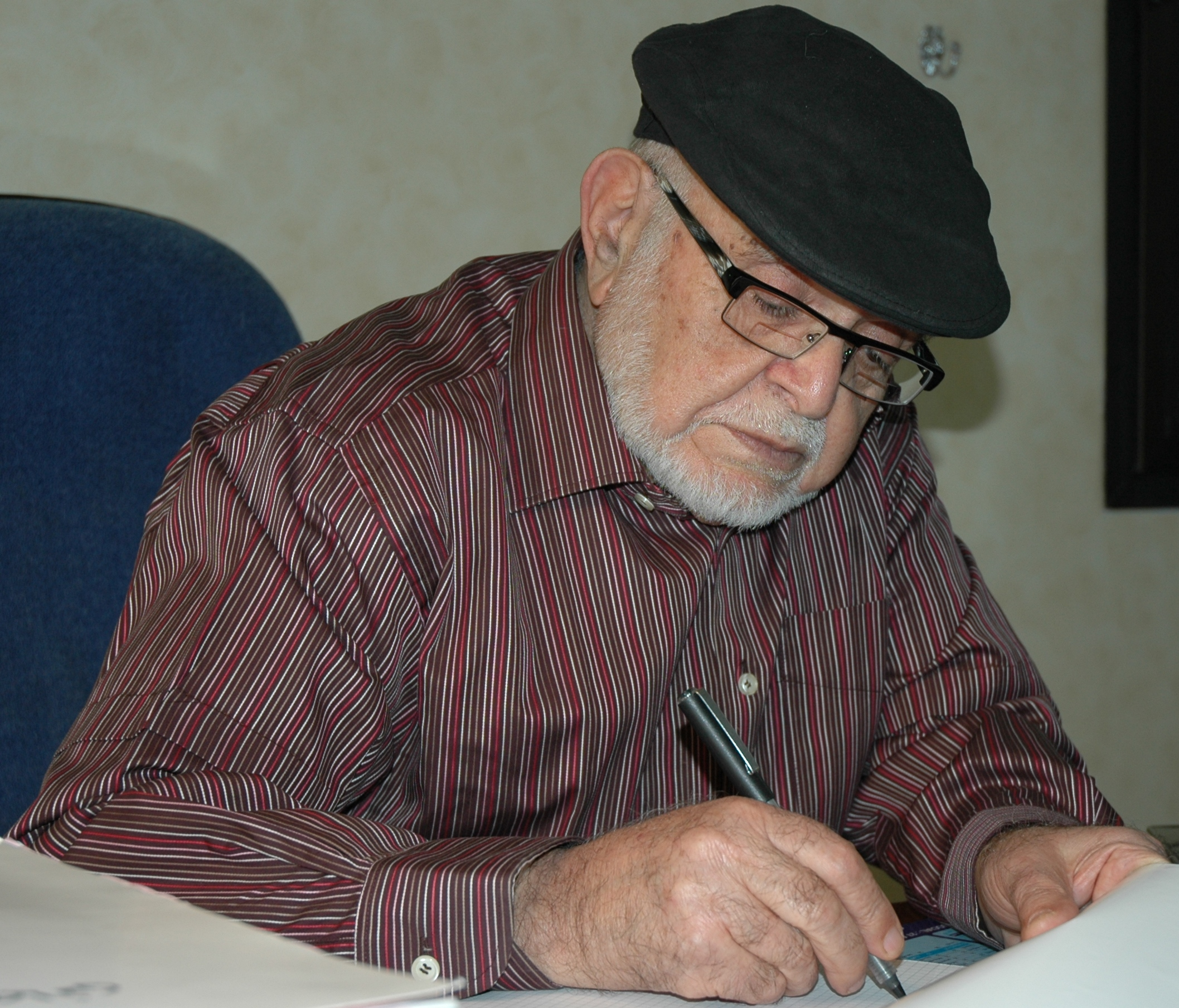
- Born: 9 September 1928; Fez, Morocco
- Citizenship: Morocco
- Occupations: Actor; Playwright; Writer; Lyricist

Ahmed Taib El Alj (9 September 1928 – 1 December 2012) was a Moroccan writer of Moroccan Arabic Zajal poetry and drama. He received several prizes and decorations for his service to Moroccan Arabic language theatre.

== Life ==
El Alj was born in Fes. He wrote more than forty plays and adapted more than thirty works for the stage. According to Salim Jay, the work of al-Aldj is a "treasure of the culture of humanity". He rewrote, in Moroccan Arabic, works by Molière, Shakespeare and Brecht and had a great influence on Moroccan popular culture. His work was markedly influenced by French theater, especially the plays of Molière and Pierre Beaumarchais. He died in Rabat.

== Awards and honours ==
In 1973, he was awarded the prize of Literature of Morocco, and in 1975, the Medal of Intellectual Merit of Syria.

== Publications by Ahmad al-Tayyeb Aldj ==
- Al-Barnît:a. Rabat: Mat:ba`a al-Ma`ârifa al-Djadîda, 2001.
- Al-Mashrah: ba`ada al-Mut:laq: mumârasât, ishkaliyyât wa tatallu`ât, LAHBABI, Muhammad Aziz ed., Al-Masrah: al-Magribî bayna al-´ams wa-l-yawm. (Moroccan theater yesterday and today) Témara: Bayt ´Âl Muh:ammad `Azîz Lah:ababî, 1998, 43-50.
- al-Sa'd. Rabat: al-Djama'iyya al-Magribiyya li-l-Ta´lîf wa-l-Tardjama wa-l-Nashr, 1986.
- Al-´Ard wa-l-dhi´ âb: masrah:iyya fî qasmayn. Rabat: Wizâra al-Shu´űn, al-Thaqâfiyya, 1994.
- Binâ´ al-wat:an. Rabat: Masrah: Muh:ammad al-Jâmis, 1988.
- Du'â´ li-l-Quds. Rabat: s.e, 1980.
- Yűhâ wa shadjara al-tufâh. Tánger : Wakâla Shirâ´li-l-Jidamât al-`Ilâm wa-l-Ittis:âl, 1997.
