= Ali Siqli =

Ali Siqli (born in 1932) is a Moroccan writer of children's books and drama. In 1982 he received the Great Prize of Morocco (Doctor Honoris Causa) and the international King Faysal award.

== Bibliography ==
- Abt:âl al-h:idjâra., Casablanca: Mat:ba'a al-Nadjâh: al-Djadîda, 1998. (poetic novel)
- Al-Amîra Zaynab., Casablanca: Mat:ba'a al-Nadjâh: al-Djadîda, 1989.(poetry)
- Al-fath: al-akbar., Casablanca: Mat:ba'a al-Nadjâh: al-Djadîda, 1986.(drama)
- Al-Ma'raka al-kubrá, Casablanca: Mat:ba'a al-Nadjâh: al-Djadîda, 1983.

(for this book he received the Great Prize of Morocco)

- Amîra Zaynab, Casablanca: S.E., 1989.
- H:awla riwâya al-Ma'âraka al-Kubrâ, Casablanca: Mat:ba'a al-Nadjâh al-Djadîda, 1983. (reflections on his own work)
- Ma'a al-asîratayn, Casablanca: Mat:ba' al-Nadjâh: al-Djadîda, 1988.(drama)
- Masâmîr wa-mazâmîr, Rîh:ân wa-alh:ân, Casablanca: Mat:ba'a al-Nadjâh: al-Djadîda, 1982. (songs and poems)
- Risâlatî: Malh:ama shi'riyya 'alâ lisân Ibn Bat:t:űt:a, Rabat: Dâr al-Manâhil, 1997. (poem on the life of Ibn Batuta)
- Rîh:ân wa-alh:ân, Casablanca: Mat:ba'a al-Nadjâh: al-Djadîda, 1982. (poems and songs)
- Sakîna bint al-Shahîd, Casablanca: Mat:ba'a al-Nadjâh al-Djadîda, 1991.(drama)
- Âsî al-h:ayy, Casablanca: Mat:ba'a al-Nadjâh: al-Djadîda, 2002.(drama)

== See also ==
- Thouria Saqqat
