= Abu Muqri Mohammed al-Battiwi =

Moroccan astronomer

al-Battiwi
- أبو مقرئ محمد البطوي
- Born: fl. 1331

Academic work
- Era: Islamic Golden Age
- Main interests: Astronomy

Abū Muqriʾ (or al-Muqriʾ, or Miqra) Muḥammad ibn ʿAlī al-Baṭṭiwī (Arabic: أبو مقرئ (أو المقرئ) محمد بن علي البطوي) (fl. 1331) was a Moroccan astronomer who wrote a poem (urjūza) on the calendar, astronomy and the determination of the hours of Moslem prayer. According to the German orientalist Carl Brockelmann, al-Baṭṭiwī was the commanding general of the Marinid sultan of Morocco, Abu al-Hasan Ali ibn Othman.

His work was commented upon in the 15th century by Abd al-Rahman al-Jadiri, the muwaqqit (time-keeper) at the Qarawiyyin Mosque, and the mathematician Al-Qalasadi. He was a native of the Rif region of Morocco.

== Sources ==
- Brockelmann, Carl (1898). Geschichte der arabischen Litteratur (in German). Vol. 2. Berlin: Weimar E. Felber. OCLC 871501067.
- Hunwick, John O., ed. (1999). Timbuktu and the Songhay Empire Al-Saʻdi's Taʼrīkh Al-Sūdān Down to 1613, and Other Contemporary Documents. Brill Publishers. ISBN 978-90041-1-207-0.
