= Ali Haddani =

Moroccan songwriter

- Born: January 1, 1936; Fes
- Died: November 28, 2007 (aged 71)
- Occupations: Songwriter; Poet; Lyricist

Ali Haddani (born 1936 in Fes-died 2007) was a Moroccan songwriter. Some of his songs include "Yak a jarhi", "Qitar Al Hayat", "Kif idir a sidi", "Bared ou skhoun", "Ya dmouîi ya ghla ma âandi", and "Asidi ana hor".
