= Mohammed Boujendar =

Moroccan historian and poet

Mohammed Boujendar (1889–1926) was a Moroccan historian and poet. He worked as a translator for the Résidence Générale du Protectorat, published articles for the Arab language weekly As-Sa'ada (Happiness) and was a professor of literature (from 1913) at the Institut des Hautes Études Marocaines in Rabat.

Some of his books are:

- Muqaddimat al-fath min tarikh ribat al-fath, (a history of Rabat), imprimerie du Bulletin officiel, Rabat, 1926
- al-Ightibat bi-tarajimi a 'lam ar-ribat (الاغتباط بتراجم أعلام الرباط), a biography of the judges of Rabat (ed. with notes by Abdelkrim Kriem, ed. Matabi' al-Atlas, Rabat, 1987)
- Šâla wa âtâruha (ta' lîf), in French: Chellah et ses ruines: Histoire de la Zaouia de Chellah et description de ses ruines, 1922
- Al 'Itre al masky ( about his teacher Mekki Betaouri).

Boujendar was active in organizing literary salons in the 1920s, a tradition that would later be followed by Rabat's Abdallah al-Jirari in the 1930s.
