= Abu al-Hassan Ali ibn Mohammed al-Zarwili =

Moroccan qadi and writer

Personal life
- Died: 1319 Fez, in present-day Morocco
- Era: 13th-14th century
- Main interest: Islamic jurisprudence
- Known for: Commentary on the Mudawwana by Sahnun ibn Said
- Occupation: Qadi, Scholar

Religious life
- Religion: Islam
- Creed: Maliki

Abu al-Hasan Ali ibn Muhammad ibn Abd al-Haqq al-Yalisuti az-Zarwili (Arabic: أبو الحسن الصغير) known as al-Sughayyir (died 1319 in Fez) was a qadi of Taza and later qadi of Fez. He was of Berber origin. Al-Zarwili wrote a commentary of 12 volumes (Sharh al-Mudawwana) on the Mudawwana by Sahnun ibn Said and was considered a "qutb" (axis of his age) by his contemporaries.
