= Ahmed al-Salawi =

- For Al-Salawi, the author of al-Istiqsa see Ahmad ibn Khalid al-Nasiri

Ahmad ibn Mohammed ibn Nasir al-Salawi (Arabic: أحمد بن محمد بن ناصر السلاوي; 1791 in Sale – 1840 in Sudan) was a Moroccan Maliki scholar, Sufi teacher and writer, who played an important role in Sudan during the reign of the colonial Turkish-Egyptian administration. Al-Salawi was closely connected with Sudanese scholars like Ahmad ibn Isa al-Ansari, Ahmad al-Tayyib w. al-Bashir (whose daughter he married) and Ismail ibn Abd Allah al-Wali.

== Works ==
Al-Salawi wrote the following books:

- al-Dhayl., Publ. Tabaqat Wad Dayf Allah, al-dhayl wa'l-takmila, ed. Muhammad Ibrahım Abü Salım & Yüsuf Fadl H˘asan, Khartoum 1982.
- al-Durr al-manzum fı asanıdina fı sa'ir al-'ulum.
- Ishraq masabih al-tanwır fı sharh Mawlid al-bashır al-nadhır, MS: al-Maktaba al-baladiyya, Alexandria, majmüfia, alif 139.
- Ithaf ahl al-sidq, MS: Yale, L-9, 367ff., 1842,
- al-Jawhar al-maknun wa'l-sirr al-masun alladhı tataqarrab ilayhi al-fiuyun
- al-Minah al-samadiyya fı ikhtisar al-Hadıqa al-nadiyya fı shar al-Tarıqa al-Muhammadiyya wa'l-sıra al-Ahmad-iyya, MS: Cairo, Dar al-kutub, tasawwuf, 171.
- Risala (Untitled and undated. A brief work in commendation of Ismaıl b. Abd Allah al-Walı and his tarıqa.) MS: National Records Office, Khartoum, Misc., Ismaıliyya 2, 292–300.
- Sharh ala aqıdat al-Risala fı 'l-basmala wa'l-hamdala
- Sharh ala 'l-Arba'ın al-Nawawiyya
- Sharh ala 'l-Ibtihaj bi'l-kalam [or fı 'l-kalam] ala 'l-isra wa'l-mi raj, MS: al-Maktaba al-baladiyya, Alexandria, majmüfia alif, 139.
- Tazım al-ittifaq fı ayat al-mıthaq
