= Idriss al-Amraoui =

Moroccan writer and diplomat

Idriss ibn Muhammad ibn al-Amraoui (Arabic: إدريس بن محمد بن العمراوي), also spelled as Driss Al Amraoui, was a Moroccan diplomat.

== Bibliography ==
Le paradis des femmes et l'enfer des chevaux : La France de 1860 vue par l'émissaire du Sultan, La Tour d’Aigues: L'Aube, 2002 ISBN 978-2-7526-0207-7
