= Mohammed Aziz Lahbabi =

Moroccan philosopher, novelist and poet

Mohammed Aziz Lahbabi (Arabic: محمد عزيز الحبابي, romanized: Muḥammad ʿAzīz al-Ḥabābī; 25 December 1923–23 August 1993) was a Moroccan philosopher, novelist and poet writing in Arabic and French. He was nominated for the 1987 Nobel Prize for Literature.

== Career ==
Some of his books were translated into more than 30 languages. Lahbabi studied at the Sorbonne in Paris and received a doctorate of philosophy. He was professor of philosophy and dean of the faculty of letters at the Mohammed V University in Rabat. Characteristic of his philosophical writings is the union of Arab-Islamic and Western-humanistic ideas. He also wrote poetry, fiction, and non-fiction books on economics, politics, and literature. Lahbabi was one of the founders of the Union of Arab Writers of the Maghreb and the review Afaq (Horizons). He was nominated for the 1987 Nobel Prize for Literature.

== Books ==
- Le Personnalisme Musulman (1964; "Muslim Personalism")
- Le Monde de Demain: Le Tiers-Monde accuse (1980; "The World of Tomorrow: The Third World accuses").
- Espoir vagabond (1972) (novel)
- Misères et lumières (1958) (poetry)
