= Ibn Shuayb =

Islamic scholar from Taza

- ابن شعيب
- Born: Taza
- Died: 1 March 1349; Tunis

Abu l-`Abbas Ahmad ibn Muhammad ibn Shuayb al-Kirjani, known as Ibn Shuayb or Ibn Suhayb (Arabic: ابن شعيب; died 1 March 1349) was a Maghrebi scholar of medicine, alchemy, botany, astronomy, mathematics, a poet, and the chancellor of the Marinid sultan Abu al Hassan. He was born in Taza, and died in Tunis.

== Sources ==
- Velázquez Basanta, F. N. (2017). "Ibn Suhayb, Abu L-`Ala'". Biblioteca de Al-Andalus (in Spanish). Vol. 5 (Lugar y Fecha ed.). Almería: Ibn Tufayl Foundation for Arabic Studies. ISBN 978-84-934026-5-5.
