= Ahmad ibn Hamdun ibn al-Hajj =

Ahmad ibn Hamdun ibn al Hajj or Abu-l-Abbas Ahmad ibn Mohammed ibn Hamdun Ibn al-Hajj (died 1898) was a Moroccan physician and scholar who composed a history of the Alaouite dynasty in 15 volumes by order of Moulay Hasan I. He also wrote a treatise titled "Addourat ettibbya" (pearls of medicine), in which he gave, for the first time in the history of Morocco, a technical overview of medical treatments.
