= Muhammad Mayyara =

Moroccan academic

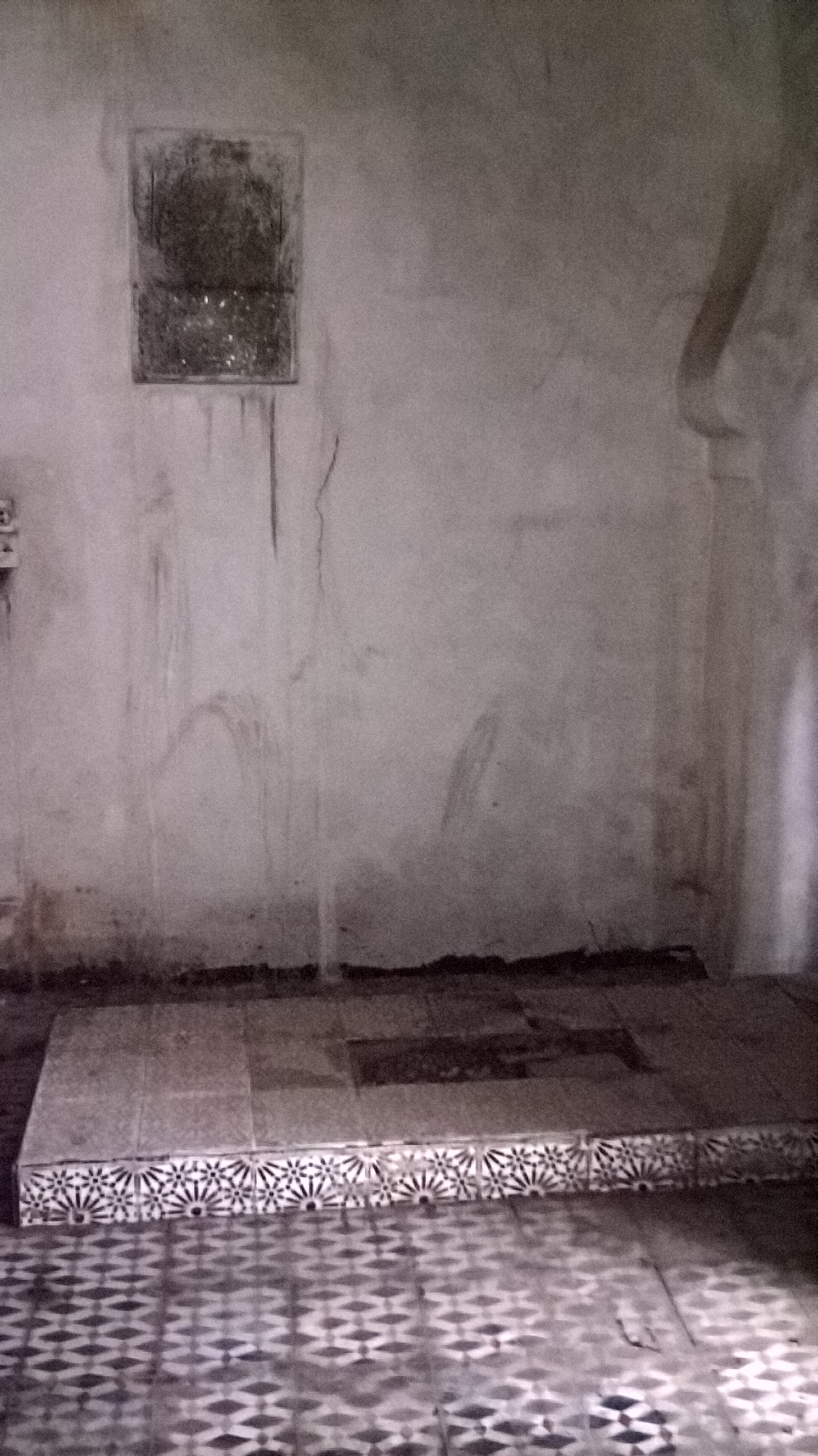
- Mayyara's tomb in Fes

Personal life
- Born: Abu Abd Allah Mahamad ibn Ahmad Mayyara; 1591 Fes, Morocco
- Died: 1662 (aged 70–71)
- Notable work(s): Commentary on the Tuhfa by Ibn Asim, Commentary on Al-Musrhid al mumin by Ibn Ashir, Sharh al-Shaykh Mayyara li-Lamiyya al-Zaqqaq
- Known for: Jurist, Theologian, Scholar of Ash'arism
- Occupation: Scholar, Jurist, Theologian

Religious life
- Religion: Islam

Abu Abd Allah Mahamad ibn Ahmad Mayyara (Arabic: محمد ميارة الفاسي; 1591–1662) was a jurist and theologian from Fes, one of the most reputable scholars of his time. He is the author of a commentary on the Tuhfa by Ibn Asim, a commentary on Al-Musrhid al mumin by his teacher Ibn Ashir and Sharh al-Shaykh Mayyara li-Lamiyya al-Zaqqaq, a commentary on al-Zaqqaq's Lamiyya. Mayyara's Nazm al-la'ali wa-l-durar contains a fahrasa and hence biographical information about himself. Well known is also his work called Nasihat al Mughtarrin in defence of Bildiyyīn (Muslims, like himself, of Jewish descent) whose position had been deteriorating after the death of Ahmad al-Mansur in 1603.
