= Zechariah Aghmati =

Zechariah ben Judah Aghmati (Hebrew: זכריה אגמאתי), also spelled Agamati, was a Rabbi and Talmudist who lived from 1120 CE - 1195 CE in Morocco.

== Works ==
R. Zechariah's major contribution was the Sefer Ha-Ner, a supercommentary on the Halachot of Isaac Alfasi. The work is extremely significant from a historical perspective as it is the first known compilation work on the Talmud. This Shittah Mekubbetzet genre grew in the 12th and 13th century and reached a pinnacle of popularity in the 15th century. His sources are almost all Sephardic and include: R. Chananel ben Chushiel, R. Barukh ha-Sefardi, R. Isaac ibn Ghiyyat, Joseph ibn Migash, Maimonides' Perush ha-Mishnayot, Rashi, and Hai Gaon and the Geonim. The quotes are all in the original, either Hebrew or Arabic, and R. Zechariah’s own comments are also in Arabic. However, most printed editions are translated into Hebrew.

In Aghmat, in the year 1190, he wrote a Talmudic commentary on Babha Kamma, Babha Mesi'a and Babha Bathera of the Babylonian Talmud. Aghmat-Ourika was the place where the Jews of Marrakesh lived until the Saadian sultan invited them to come and live in Marrakech itself.

== Bibliography ==
=== Editions of Sefer ha-Ner ===
Arranged in reverse chronological order:

- Sefer ha-Ner al Massekhet Shabbat, S. Eidenson Jerusalem, 2010
- Shittah Mekubbetzet Kadmon: sefer ha-ner, massekhet Bava Kamma, ed. Dov Zeev Havlin, Jerusalem, Institute for the Complete Israeli Talmud (Yad ha-Rav Herzog) 2009/10, 358 pp
- Shittah Mekubbetzet ha-Ner, massekhet Bava Batra, Jerusalem, Otzar ha-Poskim 1999
- Shittah Mekubbetzet ha-Ner, massekhet Bava Batra, Jerusalem, Machon Harry Fischel 1987/8, ed. Yekutiel Zalman Cohen, 175 pp
- Sefer ha-Ner al Massekhet Berakhot (ed. Meir David ben-Shem), Jerusalem, Machon Torah Shelemah 1958, 141 pp
- A digest of commentaries on the tractates Bābhā ķammā, Bābhā meṣīʻā and Bābhā bhātherā of the Babylonian Talmud, ed. Leveen, British Museum 1961

=== Compilations of commentaries including extracts from Sefer ha-Ner ===
Arranged by order of tractate:

- Kovetz Rishonim le-Massekhet Moed Katan, ed Nissan Sachs, Institute for the Complete Israeli Talmud 1966
- Ohel Yeshayahu, ed Hillel Mann, Bava Kamma, 2000-1
- Shittat Ha-Kadmonim, M.Y. Blau, Bava Metzia, Bava Batra (2 volumes)
- Arba’ah Sefarim Niftahim: Sefer Perushe Rabbenu Hananel u-Vet Medrasho: Bava Batra, ed Cohen, 2002, 544 pp
- Kadmonim al Massekhet Bava Batra, Jerusalem, Agudat Torat Hesed 2004
- Kovetz Sakotah le-Roshi, Bava Batra, Bnei Brak 2003
- Hiddushe ha-R”I Migas le-Massekhet Bava Batra, ed. Shapira, Machon Torani-Sifruti Oraita, 1985, 280 pp
- Hiddushe ha-R”I Migas le-Massekhet Bava Batra, ed. Shapira, Friedman, 1978, 266 pp

=== Secondary literature ===
- S. Assaf, "Chelek miPirush Kadmon le-Massekhet Berachot le-Echad mi-Bnei Zemano shel ha-Rambam", in Le-Zikhron R' Z. P. Chayyes, Jerusalem 1933
- Yehoshua Hutner, "Sefer ha-Ner le-Rabbenu Zechariah Aghmati", in Sefer Zikkaron le-R. Yitzchak Yedidyah Frankel, Tel Aviv 1992 (contains first chapter of Bava Kamma)
- C. Z. Hirschburg, Tarbiẕ 42 (1973)
- Ta Shma Sifrut Haparshanit pp 156–159
- Y. Malchi, "R. Zechariah Aghmati, ha-Ish, Yetzirato, ha-Parshanut, ve-Yachasah le-Ferushei Rashi", Shanan 14 (2009) pp 65–73
- Y. Malchi, "Rashi's Commentary to Tractate Berachot Included in Sefer Haner of R. Zecharyah Agamati" [in Hebrew], Alei Sefer, vol. 17, 1993, p. 85-95.
