= Badia Hadj Nasser =

Badia Hadj Nasser (Tanger, 8 May 1938) is a psychoanalyst-writer. She is the author of the novel Le voile mis à nu (The exposed veil).

== Life ==
She then devoted himself to psychoanalysis clinically and in terms of research. She is participating in work on "The Arabian Nights" published in Written works, Arabia today, PUF, 1989. She also produced a text entitled "The fascination of virginity and its resonance in the immigrant women body" in Space-Time and exile Traces, Grenoble.

She is a member of Société des Gens de Lettres. She lives in Paris and Tanger.

== Works ==
- Lettres à Lui, Éditions du Seuil, 1980. Novel.
- Les plages ignorées , Éditions du Seuil, 1982. Novel.
- Le voile mis à nu, Éditions Arcantères, 1985. Novel. ISBN 9782868290083
  - El velo al desnudo, Translator María Esperanza del Arco Heras, Alcalá Grupo Editorial, 2007, ISBN 9788496806221
- Les mille et une nuits, corps écrit, l'Arabie heureuse, PUF, 1989. Essai.
- La fascination de la virginité et sa résonance dans le corps des femmes immigrées, Éditions La pensée sauvage, 1991. Essai.
- Essai sur les femmes libres dans l'Antiquité et de nos jours de la Méditerranée au Gange, Éditions G. Pastre, 1992.
- Ouvrage collectif. Les Hédonistes, Editions de la Guette, 2009. Nouvelles. (Editions de la Guette, ISBN 9782360550005
- Tanger, rue de Londres: nouvelles, Marsam, 2010, ISBN 9789954212011
- Le cap des Trois Fourches, Éd. de la Guette, 2012, ISBN 9782360550012
