= Abdallah ibn Azzuz =

Moroccan writer

Abdallah ibn Azzuz or Abu Mohammed Abdallah ibn Azzuz al-Kurashi al-Shadhili al-Marrakushi also known as Sidi Balla (died 1789) was a writer from Morocco. He mainly wrote on mysticism, but also on medicine. Ibn Azzuz's Mahab al-kuzuf wa-nafy al-zulumai fi il al-tibb wa l-tabai wa l-hikma, a collection of therapeutic formulae, was especially well-known. His work about medicinal plants, Kashf al-rumuz was equally well-known.
