= Mohammed Akensus =

Moroccan historian

Mohammed Akensus (Arabic: محمد أكنسوس, romanized: Muḥammad Akanṣūs, also known simply as Akensous) or Abu Abdallah Mohammed ben Ahmad Akensus al-Marrakushi (1797, (Sous) - 1877) was a Moroccan historian and a minister under Mulay Slimane and moulay Abd al-Rahman. He is from the Berber tribe of Ida u-Kansus which inhabited the Sous region in southern Morocco.

He wrote on the reign of moulay Mohammed ben Abdallah and is the author of Al-Djaish al-aramram (The Great Army), lith. Fas (1918).
