= Abdarrahman al-Makudi =

Abu Zaid Abd-Arrahman Ibn Ali Salih al-Makkudi (Arabic: عبد الرحمن المكودي; died in Fes, in 1405) was a grammarian from Morocco.
