= Mohammed al-Duayf =

Moroccan writer

Mohammed al-Duayf (Arabic: محمد الضعيف الرباطي) or Abu abd Allah Mohammad Al-murabit ben Abd as-Salam ben Ahmed ben Muhamad al-Duayyif al-Ribati (born Rabat, Morocco 1752) was a Moroccan writer. He is the author of Tarikh al Du'ayyif, a source on the life of Sultan Mohammed ben Abdallah (1757–1790).
