= Lotfi Akalay =

Moroccan journalist, writer, and businessman (1943–2019)

- Born: November 7, 1943; Tangier
- Died: December 18, 2019 (aged 76)
- Occupations: Writer; Journalist; Opinion journalist

Lotfi Akalay (1943–2019), born in Tangier, was a Moroccan journalist, writer and businessman. In 2006 he published a collection of his chronicles in one book Les Nouvelles de Tanger.

He died on 18 December 2019.
