= Abderrafi Jouahri =

- Born: 1943 (age 82–83); Fez, Morocco
- Occupations: Journalist, Columnist, Songwriter, Politician, Author
- Political party: Socialist Union of Popular Forces

Abderrafi Jouahri (born 1943 in Fes) is a Moroccan columnist, songwriter and politician.
