= Mohammed al-Habib al-Fourkani =

Mohammed al-Habib al-Fourkani (1922 in Tahannaout – 2008) was a Moroccan writer, historian and politician who played an important role during the struggle for independence.

== Works ==
- Attaoura al khamissa (The fifth revolution)
- Noujoum fi Yadi (stars between my hands)
- Doukhane min Al-Azmina Al-Mohtariqa (smoke of glowing times).
- Al maghrib fi azamatihi atalat (Morocco and its three crises)
