= Mohammed al-Hazmiri =

Moroccan writer

Abu Abd Allah Mohammed ibn Mohammed ibn Abd Allah ibn Tijillat al-Hazmiri al-Marrakushi (born in Nafis, near Aghmat fl. 1320) was a Moroccan writer of the 14th century, member of the zawiyya Hazmiriyya and author of Itimid al-aynayn wa-nushat an-nazir in fi manaqib al-ahawayn Abi Zayd wa-Abi Abd Allah al-Hazmiryyayn.
