= Ibn al-Yasamin =

12th-century Berber mathematician

Abu Muhammad 'Abdallah ibn Muhammad ibn Hajjaj ibn al-Yasmin al-Adrini al-Fessi (Arabic: ابن الياسمين) (died 1204), more commonly known as ibn al-Yasmin, was a Moroccan mathematician. He was born in Fez and received his education in Fez and Sevilla, maybe that’s why some historians refer to him as “al-Ishbili”. Little is known of his personal life except that he was born into a Berber family. He is well known for his crucial contribution in developing Ghūbari numerals (West “Arabic” numerals), which are currently used in most parts of the world. Besides mathematics, he also became famous in literature, law, and particularly in Andalusian poetry.
