= Maati Kabbal =

Maati Kabbal (born 1954 in Khouribga, Morocco) is a writer, essayist and specialist in Moroccan literature. He is a frequent contributor to French and Moroccan television programs and newspapers like Libération and Le Monde diplomatique.
