= Abdul Salam Al Haras =

- Born: 1930
- Died: February 20, 2015 (aged 84–85)

Abdul Salam Al Haras (Arabic: عبد السلام الهراس) (1930 – February 20, 2015) was a Moroccan researcher, investigator, philosopher, translator, and preacher, whose body of work was divided equally between articles, investigations, and translation. He is considered one of the pioneers of Islamic work in Morocco.

== Life and education ==
He was born in the city of Chefchaouen in northern Morocco in the year 1349 AH/1930 AD.

He studied primary and secondary school in his city, then at Al-Qarawiyyin in Fez, then at the Sharia College in Beirut, Lebanon.

He also lived for a period in Cairo and Damascus, during which he met Abd al-Karim al-Khattabi and other great reformers in the Arab and Islamic world. He was one of the students of the Algerian thinker Malik bin Nabi, and contributed to the dissemination of his ideas and visions, and advised Dr. Abdel-Sabour Shaheen to translate his books for their importance.

== Positions ==
He was a professor at Mohammed V University, and then at the University of Sidi Mohammed bin Abdullah in Fez from 1964 to 1997. He was also a visiting professor and lecturer at universities, including: the Arabian Gulf University in Bahrain, where he lectured on the topic of reform men “Jamal al-Din al-Afghani, and Muhammad Abdouh, Malik bin Nabi”, the University of Madrid, the Faculty of Arts in Spain, the Imam Muhammad bin Saud Islamic University and others.

He participated in more than thirty conferences and symposia in the Arab world, Africa and Europe. He also supervised more than fifty doctorates and masters in Andalusian literature, Islamic thought and Islamic studies.

== Memberships ==
- Member of the Supreme Council of the Islamic University (ten years).
- Member of the World Supreme Council of Mosques, affiliated to the Muslim World League.
- Member of the International Islamic Charitable Organization in Kuwait.
- Member of the International Union of Muslim Scholars in Qatar.
- Member of the Union of Moroccan Writers.

== Works ==
His works varied between investigations of heritage anecdotes, and writings, studies and research on various topics. He was also fluent in the Spanish language, and translated several poems, pieces and literary research from it.

=== Books ===
- Islam is a religion of moderation, virtues and eternal values. Imam Muhammad bin Saud Islamic University, Riyadh (2004)
- Andalusia between Test and Consideration: The Story of the Fall of Andalusia from Conquest to Exodus. Al-Andalus Al-Khadra House, Saudi Arabia (2005)
- The happiness of women in the Shade of Islam. Dar Al Salam for printing, publishing, distribution and translation, Cairo (2010)
- Abu Bakr Al-Siddiq and Crisis Management. Dar Al-Salaam for printing, publishing, distribution and translation, Cairo (2010)

=== Investigations ===
- Durar Al-Shamt in Al-Sibt, written by Ibn Al-Abar Al-Bishi Abu Abdullah Muhammad bin Abi Bakr, (in conjunction with Saeed Ahmed Arab). Karimadis Press, Tetouan (1972)
- Riyadh Flowers in Ayyad News, by Ahmed Al-Maqri Al-Telmisani, investigation (in conjunction with Saeed Ahmed Arab). Rabat, the joint committee for the dissemination of the Islamic heritage between the government of the Kingdom of Morocco and the United Arab Emirates (1980)
- Diwan Ibn al-Abar, investigation. Tunisian House, Tunisia (1985) and also published by the Ministry of Awqaf and Islamic Affairs in Morocco in 1999
- The link of the connection, by Ibn Al-Zubair Al-Gharnati, investigation (in conjunction with Saeed Ahmed Arab). Ministry of Endowments and Islamic Affairs in Morocco (1993)
- Supplementation of the book Al-Salaah, by Ibn Al-Abar Al-Andalusi, investigation. Dar Al-Fikr for printing, Lebanon (1995)

=== Translations ===
- Virgin Eyes, by Becker Gustan Adoln, The Call to Truth, issue 3, December.

== Death ==
Abdul Salam Al Haras died on Friday, February 20, 2015, in Fez.
