= Abd as-Salam al-Alami =

Moroccan scientist

Abd as-Salam ibn Mohammed ibn Ahmed al-Hasani al-Alami al-Fasi (Arabic: عبدالسلام العلمي) (1834-1895) was a scientist from Fes. He was an expert in the field of astronomy, mathematics and medicine. Al-Alami was the author of several books in these fields and the designer of solar instruments.
