= Tewfik Allal =

French writer and essayist

Tewfik Allal (Arabic: توفيق علال) is a French trade unionist born on October 11, 1947, in Oujda in Morocco. He is a writer and a prominent political figure. He is the president of the association Manifeste des libertés.

== Books ==
- Situations migratoires—La fonction-miroir (Editions Galilée, 1977, with Jean-Pierre Buffard, Michel Marié, and Tomaso Regazzola)

== See also ==
- Politics of Morocco
