= Abdelmalek Belghiti =

Abdelmalek Belghiti (1906 in Fes – 2010) born in Fez, was a celebrated Moroccan poet often hailed as the “prince of the poets” during the 1950s due to his eloquent and heartfelt verse. He published several collections of poetry, such as Al Manar et Rah Al Arouah, and saw his entire body of poetry compiled into an anthology in 1947.

Belghiti received numerous literary prizes over his long career. Many of his poems were dedicated to the struggle for the independence of Morocco, like his poems about the protest against the Berber Dahir, the bloody suppression following the manifest of independence in 1944 and the deportation of sultan Mohammed V. Abdelmalek was a son of the well known and respected cadi, scholar, and poet Abou Abbas Ahmed ben Mahmoun Belghiti (1865- 1929), whose legacy significantly shaped his literary path.
