= Rita El Khayat =

Moroccan psychiatrist and writer

Rita El Khayat (Arabic: غيثة الخياط) also known as "Ghita". Ghita El Khayat, (altern. translit. Rita), (born 1944, Rabat, Morocco) is a Moroccan psychiatrist, anthro-psychoanalyst, writer, and anthropologist. She studied at modern schools of Rabat and completed her graduation in the field of Psychiatry, Psychoanalyst and Medical Aerospace from Paris whereas graduation in Ergonomics and Occupational Medicine were completed from Bordeaux. She did her PhD in Anthropology of Arab World from (School of High Studies in Social Sciences, EHESS in Paris).

Rita added that apart from being a medical doctor, she has served a Professor as well as conceiver of Anthropology at the University of Milan, Women Studies member at Quebec Canada a French Language University, UQUAM abbreviated as Université du Québec à Montréal, a journalist as well as an author of not only the articles but books too, who had published thirty six books till 2012.

While in Paris she studied ethnopsychiatry under George Devereux and also studied Classical Arabic at École spéciale des Langues orientales and began to write.

In 1999 she founded the Association Ainï Bennaï to broaden the culture in Morocco and Maghreb. In 2000, the Association became a publishing house.

She is known for her strong involvement in favour of women's emancipation and social rights.

She is author of more than 350 articles and 36 books.

She is professor of anthropology of the knowledge at the Faculty of Letters and Philosophy of the D'Annunzio University of Chieti–Pescara in Italy.

== Career and awards ==
She spent almost 10 years in France, Europe after that she returned to the city where she was born.

During her studies she was also active as radio speaker, TV and cinema artist. She has also served as lecturer of Anthropology of Knowledge at the University of Chieti in Italy, as an Ambassador of Mediterranean Games of Pescara, Italy in year 2009, she received the Nobel Peace Prize and honored as Laureate in Maiori, Italy 2007, a Council of Directors member of the International Festival Film of Marrakech, African Women's Development and Communication Network (FEMNET) member since 2007 and host of Moroccan national radio daily program known as, A Book, a Friend.

Rita El Khayat is known for her participation in emancipation and social rights for women. Most of her writings including books and articles revolve around women rights and the world for them like La Femme dans le Monde Arabe (Women in the Arab World), Le Maghreb des Femmes (The Maghreb for Women), Le Somptueux Maroc des Femmes (The Sumptuous Morocco of Women), etc.

== Books ==
Rita is an author of 36 books and more than 350 articles . Her books are written in French language. Books published by the author:

1. Le Monde Arabe au Féminin - (L’Harmattan, Paris, 1985).
2. Une Psychiatrie Moderne pour le Maghreb (A Modern Psychiatry for the Maghreb) - (L’Harmattan, Paris,1994)
3. Les sept jardins - Ed. L’Harmattan Parigi, 1995.
4. La Folie, El Hank – (Eddif, Casablanca, 2000)
5. Le Maghreb des Femmes - (Marsam, Rabat 2001).
6. La Femme dans le Monde Arabe (Women in the Arab World) published in 2001.
7. Le 11 septembre 2001 des Arabes (Editions Aïni Bennaï, août 2002)
8. Le Somptueux Maroc des Femmes - (Marsam, Rabat, 2002).
9. Le Livre des Prénoms du Monde Arabe (The Book of First Names of the Arab World) - (Eddif, Casablanca 2002 alla settima edizione).
10. La Donna nel mondo arabo, (essay published in Italian, Jaca Book WIDE, Milan, 2003)
11. Le Désenfantement - (Editions Ainï Bennaï, Casablanca 2003)
12. Le Sein (Editions Ainï Bennaï, Casablanca, 2003)
13. Métissages culturels (Culture Mixing) - (co-author: Alain Goussot), (Editions Ainï Bennaï, Casablanca, 2003)
14. La liaison (a novel, Ed. Aïni Bennaï December 2003) translated in English (The Affair, 2018 by Peter Thompson )
15. Les Arabes riches de Marbella, The rich Arabs of Marbella - (Editions Ainï Bennaï, Casablanca, 2004)
16. L’Oeil du Paon (The Eye of the Peacock) - (Editions Ainï Bennaï, Casablanca, 2004)
17. Psychiatrie, culture et politique (Psychiatry, Culture and Politics)(co-author: Alain Goussot), Editions Ainï Bennaï, Casablanca, 2005
18. La nonagénaire, ses chèvres et l’îlot de Leila – (Editions Ainï Bennaï, Casablanca, 2006)
19. Le Fastueux Maroc des traditions(The Sumptuous Morocco of Traditions)- (Editions Ainï Bennaï, Casablanca, 2007).

Her books are mostly written in the French language but as she is loved for her work around the world. Her works have also been translated and published in Italy, Germany, Malta, USA

== « Le Livre des Prénoms du Monde Arabe» ==
The Book of First Names of the Arab World published in 2002.

As its title the book explains the phenomenon of First name. The first name is a name attached to the patronymic name. It is used to distinguish members of the same family. It's the usual name someone is called, referred to, and responds to.

Giving a child a "first name" is a normal universal human phenomenon.

The need and importance of naming individuals, accopagned the emergence of the language. In Morocco the surname was systematically imposed around the 20th century, when the civil status was introduced in the country.

From an anthropological point of view the first name corresponds to something very profound in the considered culture . It is related to the language of the ethnic group or group of peoples considered, to its history, references, religion, beliefs, evolution, sense of symbol and trace.

The first name marks an individual as something permanent; just like a tattoo or a skin color.

The book had also shown influence in the Moroccan law. Since it was published in 1996, reissued in 1998 and 1999, laws have been voted by the Moroccan Parliament prohibiting all non-Arabic names, all foreign names. For so a list of "controlled" first names was made and provided only to fathers, since they are the only ones who can declare the child to civil registrars.

According to the author First names can be classified into three categories:

1-those derived from Arabic

2- those from the three Moroccan Berber dialects, Tachelhit, Tamazight or Tarifi.

3-those from the Moroccan Jewish minority,

There are no specific origine to First names, but in the book the anthropologiste tried to classify them;

- Very rare, uncommon first names, without very precise meanings;

- religious first names, they are very common and known, in both male and female (Mohammed, Zineb, Myriem,)

- Names taken from Arab-Muslim history; such as Omar, Hamza, Abdallah..etc.

- First names originated in forgotten tales and legends, songs or even proverbs.

- Old names but still in force.

- Recent or "invented" first names.

- Names related to the region (Zérouala, Doukkalas region near Casablanca).

- First names of foreign origin, for example Jordan, Jessica et Naomi.

- Names referring to animals, things, stars, precious stones, plants.

The book show some conflict between parents made because of giving the first name to their child. For example women in Morocco cannot transmit or give their "Patronymic" surname to their child, for so they often demande to give the first name for the child, in order to claim that she's the one who bore him and, therefore, her motherhood begins when she gives a social and real existence to the child. In some other countries women are forced to follow the desire of their husbands, but in other cases where women really love their husband she will accept any first name given to the child by his father . This event shows 2 things: that the woman requires recognition of her maternal role, and secondly that she only gives birth to the husband.

To give a name to the child is really important as it offers him an identity, a singularity, and to make him live, sharing, the symbols of the environment that makes him what he is.

Another anthropological and social aspect of Moroccan society which is; the case of naming an abandonment child.

The abandonment of children is a tragic subject in Morocco where the child born out of marriage is a sin. He is somehow condemned to the worst of lives, because he is only the child of a woman whose surname he does not even have the right to carry. The government gives the mother the right to choose an imaginary family name from a third party patrony list, the same for all children without a father. Or give him the surname of her own father or any living male member of her paternal family with their permission.

== « Diversités et métissages culturels » ==
The book Diversités et métissages culturels written by Rita El khayat which is an edition of Métissages culturels (Diversity and Culture Mixing) which was published back in the year 2003 talks about how the world has become fast-paced, growing continuously and constantly and the changes it leaves behind are immense.

These changes are brought up by the diversities of people present all around the globe. This book moreover talks about the relationship which exists between people and eras of different times and studies their relation of past, present and future and what the population of the world was in past and what it is today.

Lastly, the book sees how the vast diversity has blended people together in good or strange ways.

== « Le Désenfantement » ==
The book (The Defeatment) published in 2002, written by Rita El Khayat is actually about the author's true story on how she lost her child on 15 February 1997. The pain and loss the mother went through after her daughter named "Aïni" got lost. The feelings and cry of a mother is described in the book as she grieves about her lost child and visits all the places her child might have crossed. The sufferings of the poor mother, the sorrow and tears are felt who refuse to accept the reality that her child is lost and the defeat that she couldn't find her, as the chapters goes on.

« Le somptueux Maroc des femmes »

The book, (The sumptuous Morocco of women) was published in 1994. As from the name this book is dedicated to the magnificent and gorgeous women of Morocco. The book shows how the authors have gone into the depths of the traditions and customs followed by women in Morocco. Sumptuous events like birth of a child, marriage, daily traditions like clothing and living and the art the Moroccan women followed in their daily lives all are well explained in this book of "Le somptueux Maroc". So if anyone wants to know about Moroccan Women and traditions, they must read this book written by Rita El Khayat.
