= Khnata Bennouna =

Moroccan author

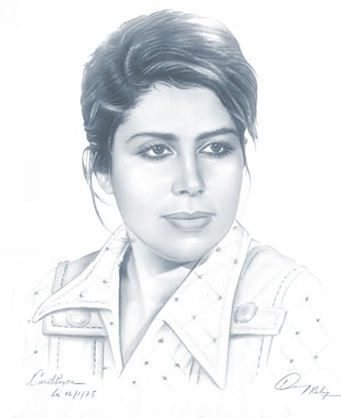
Khnata Bennouna

Khnata Bennouna (Arabic: خناثة بنونة born in Fez, Morocco from a family of four children, 1940) is a Moroccan author of novels and short stories.

Bennouna is regarded as a politically inclined writer. Her books frequently deal with the Palestinian subject both from a political and humanitarian point of view. Bennouna worked as a principal of Wullada high-school at Casablanca.

== Life ==
Khnata Bennouna is the first Moroccan woman to write, at a time when only men were taking over this activity. She is one of the first Moroccan women to challenge traditions and customs after refusing to marry at a very young age and after rebelling against her father’s wishes.

She was also the first woman to write a novel. This was in 1969 and the preface is none other than the leader of the national movement Allal El Fassi.

== Bibliography ==
- Liyasqet Assamt (Down with Silence!) (1967)
- Annar wa Al-'ikhtiyar (Fire and Choice) (1969) - won the Morocco Literary Prize in 1971
- Assawt wa Assurah (Sound and Image) (1975)
- Al-A'asifah (The Tempest) (1979)
- Al-Ghad wa Al-Ghadab (Tomorrow and Wrath) (1981)
- Assamt Annatiq (Talking Silence) (1987)
