= Ibrahim ibn Hilal al-Sijilmasi =

Moroccan legal scholar

Personal life
- Born: Ibrahim ibn Hilal al-Sijilmasi; 1414 Sijilmasa
- Died: 1497-1498
- Notable work(s): al-Durr al-nathīr alá Ajwibat Abī al-Hasan al-Saghīr, Hādhihi ajwibat al-Imām ibn Hilāl, Commentary on Misbah al-arwah fi usul al falah
- Other name: Abu Ishak
- Occupation: Jurist, Scholar

Religious life
- Religion: Islam
- Denomination: Sunni
- School: Maliki

Abu Ishak Ibrahim ibn Hilal al-Sijilmasi (Arabic: إبراهيم بن هلال السجلماسي; died circa 1497-1498) was a Maghrebi legal scholar well known for his verdicts (fatwas). He is the author of al-Durr al-nathīr alá Ajwibat Abī al-Hasan al-Saghīr, Hādhihi ajwibat al-Imām ibn Hilāl and a commentary on Misbah al-arwah fi usul al falah.
