= Farida Diouri =

Moroccan novelist

Farida Diouri (1953 – August 8, 2004) was a Moroccan novelist. She began to write at age 40, and her first novel, Vivre dans la dignité, ou mourir was selected for the Grand Atlas Prize, organized by the French Embassy in Morocco.

== Biography ==
Born in Larache (Morocco), 68 years old, 2 children, divorced, daughter of the Hispano-Moroccan writer Driss Diouri. Currently lives in Paris

Studies at the Spanish Institute then at the French mission. French A4 baccalaureate at the Lycée Descartes in Rabat (Morocco) and studies in economics at the Faculty of Law in Rabat. Since 1993, executive of an American hotel chain and correspondent of newspapers, such as "ECHO TOURISTIQUE".

She started writing at 40 and her first novel "LIVE IN DIGNITY OR DIE" was selected for the Grand Atlas prize, organized by the French Embassy in Morocco. Several interviews in Morocco, France and Egypt (the article in the Egyptian Journal Al Haram was taken up in January 2001 by the Jewish Review of Jerusalem).

== Novels ==
- Vivre dans la dignité, ou mourir, 1993
- Dans tes yeux, la flamme infernale, l'Harmattan, 2000.
- L'Ange et la misère, Paris Harmattan, 2002.
