= Mohammed ibn Abu al-Qasim al-Sijilmasi =

Moroccan Maliki scholar

Personal life
- Born: Sijilmasa, Morocco
- Died: 1800 Boujad, Morocco
- Main interest(s): Islamic jurisprudence, Literary theory
- Notable work: Sharh al-amal al-mutlaq: al-musammá bi-Fath al-jalīl al-samad fī sharh al-takmīl wa-al-mutamad
- Occupation: Scholar

Religious life
- Religion: Islam
- Denomination: Sunni
- Creed: Maliki

Abu Abd Allah Mohammed ibn Abi al-Qasim al-Sijilmasi (Arabic: محمد بن أبي القاسم السجلماسي) was a Moroccan Maliki scholar. He is especially well known for his Sharh al-amal al-mutlaq: al-musammá bi-Fath al-jalīl al-samad fī sharh al-takmīl wa-al-mutamad. It was finished in 1782. According to al-Hajwi, Sijilmasi died of the plague in Boujad on the i ith of Shawwal 1214/1800.

== See also ==
- Abd al-Rahman al-Fasi
- Ali ibn Qasim al-Zaqqaq
