= Leila Abouzeid =

Moroccan writer

- ليلة أبو زيد
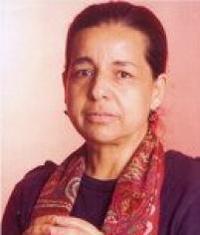
- Abouzeid in 2016
- Born: Leila Abouzeid; 1950 (age 75–76); El Ksiba, Morocco
- Occupations: Writer, Journalist
- Writing career
- Genres: Fiction, Non-fiction
- Subjects: Identity, Islam, Gender, Post-colonialism
- Notable works: The Year of the Elephant, The Last Chapter

Leila Abouzeid (Arabic: ليلة أبو زيد; born 1950) is a Moroccan author. She writes in Arabic and is the first Moroccan woman writer of literature to have her works published in English-language translation.

== Works ==
=== Year of the Elephant ===
Her first book, Year of the Elephant, was published in 1980, in English by University of Texas Press in 1989, in French in 2005. The book is named after a battle in Islamic history in which a flock of birds dropped stones on the enemy elephants, causing them to turn around. She compares this historic battle to the Moroccans battling for independence because they are mere birds compared to the global power of their French rulers.

==== Identity ====
Her work touches upon the identity of people, and the nature of the possession of it or lack thereof. In the beginning of The Year of the Elephant, the main character is wandering the streets after a devastating divorce. As she barely holds onto the will to live she states, "I feel nothing. Have I lost my own identity?" (Abouzeid, Year of the Elephant, 2). Her divorce has taken away her personality and sense of self entirely. Identity is again brought up in The Last Chapter regarding the lost teacher Mademoiselle Doze. Aisha's teacher had been rejected by her fiancé, and she became a shell of her former self. Abouzeid describes her as just a body showing up for class, not Doze (Abouzeid 6). All soul that was left in her body had seemingly left, and the teacher barely existed. Aisha examines how this sudden change happened, and questions: "Can you lose your identity like you use an identification card? Does some unseen part of the machinery snap, suddenly and irreparably?" (Abouzeid, pg. 6).

=== Last Chapter ===
In The Last Chapter, there are only two girls in Aisha's classroom of 42 students. Out of those two, only Aisha graduated. The misogyny present in real life Morocco is mirrored through this book. In Morocco, women are not very well educated, and something like two women in a class was typical and accepted. Abouzeid did very well in school because of the brain she was not expected to have. Men assumed women were born with no intelligence (which is contradicted by scientific evidence), but it is assumed this is because their education was stifled by the patriarchal government. In a study in 2009, literacy rates in Morocco were recorded at 39.6% for women, 65.7% for men, and only 10% for women from rural areas (DoS p. 2). In other words, women are barely educated, and a majority of them cannot even read, while most men are literate.

==== Relationship with the French ====
Abouzeid's radio show was unique because it was spoken in Arabic, as opposed to French. Almost every radio broadcast was done in French because the radio was a business, and French was used in business. As part of her program, she translated movie scripts into Arabic and did dramatic readings. One of these was the famous autobiography of Malcolm X. She translated this script into Arabic and read it theatrically over the air.

Reading other people's books may have led her to make her own work instead. She still to this day refuses to use French because it is the language of their foreign invaders, and Arabic is both Morocco's official language and Islam's language. Speaking Arabic, English, and French, Abouzeid still uses primarily Arabic because she does not want to conform to the foreign culture that has taken over her country. She does not want to stand for a culture that she is not a part of. To Abouzeid, the use of the French language is being submissive to invaders that are not even present anymore. In The Last Chapter, Abouzeid explains her opinion on the use of French in her school years in her closing chapter called Afterword: by the author:

"I was in a private school in Rabat where Arabic and French were the languages of instruction. I loathed reading in French and developed an aversion to using it outside the classroom. This early position against the language of the colonialist proved fortunate, as it kept me from becoming one of the post-colonial Maghrebi [North African] writers producing national literature in a foreign language. My intense aversion toward French may explain why I turned to English as my means of communication with the West" (Abouzeid, The Last Chapter 153).

Abouzeid expresses her contempt for the French and their language several times, and even while she was young and in school she hated French. Again in the novel, she mentions her hatred for French schooling, "I feel bad for mademoiselle Doze, even if she was French" (Abouzeid, 6). Abouzeid also has personal reasons to hate the French. The French had arrested and tortured her father for being an advocate of Moroccan Nationalism and had forced the language upon her. This made her hate the French from a very young age. She does not show any hate for other foreign languages like the English language because they have not personally caused harm to her.

== Selected works ==
- Year of the Elephant: A Moroccan Woman's Journey Toward Independence, Center for Middle Eastern Studies, University of Texas, 1990
- Return to Childhood, Center for Middle Eastern Studies, University of Texas, 1999, ISBN 978-0-292-70490-9
- The Last Chapter, The American University in Cairo Press, 2003
- The Director and Other Stories from Morocco, Center for Middle Eastern Studies, University of Texas, 2006, ISBN 978-0-292-71265-2
- Life of the Prophet – A Biography of Prophet Mohammed, 2009
