= Abd al-Rahman al-Jadiri =

Abu Zayd Abd al-Rahman Mohammed al-Jadiri
- عبد الرحمن الجدري
- Born: 1375; Meknes, Morocco
- Died: 1416 (aged 40–41); Fez

Academic work
- Era: Islamic Golden Age
- Main interests: Astronomer, muwaqqit
- Notable works: Raudat al-azhar fl 'ilm waqt al-lail wal-nahar, Tanbllt al-afliím 'ala mii ya

Abu Zayd Abd al-Rahman Mohammed al-Jadiri (Arabic: عبد الرحمن الجدري) (born in Meknes, in 1375 and died in Fez, probably in 1416) was the muwaqqit (time-keeper) at the Qarawiyyin Mosque.

He wrote a treatise on the determination of time of day and night, an urzija (verse composition) in 26 chapters and 335 verses, entitled Raudat al-azhar fl 'ilm waqt al-lail wal-nahar (1391/2), and a calendar adapted to the latitude of Fez, Tanbllt al-afliím 'ala mii ya/:tduthu ji ayyiim al-'iim.

== Sources ==
- Calvo, Emilia (2004). "Two Treatises on Miqat from the Maghrib (14th and 15th Centuries A.D.)". Suhayl. 4. Barcelona: 159–206. ISSN 1576-9372.
- Sarton, George (1931) [1927]. Introduction to the History of Science. Vol. 2. R. E. Krieger Pub. Co. OCLC 851177647.
