= Salim Jay =

Moroccan writer

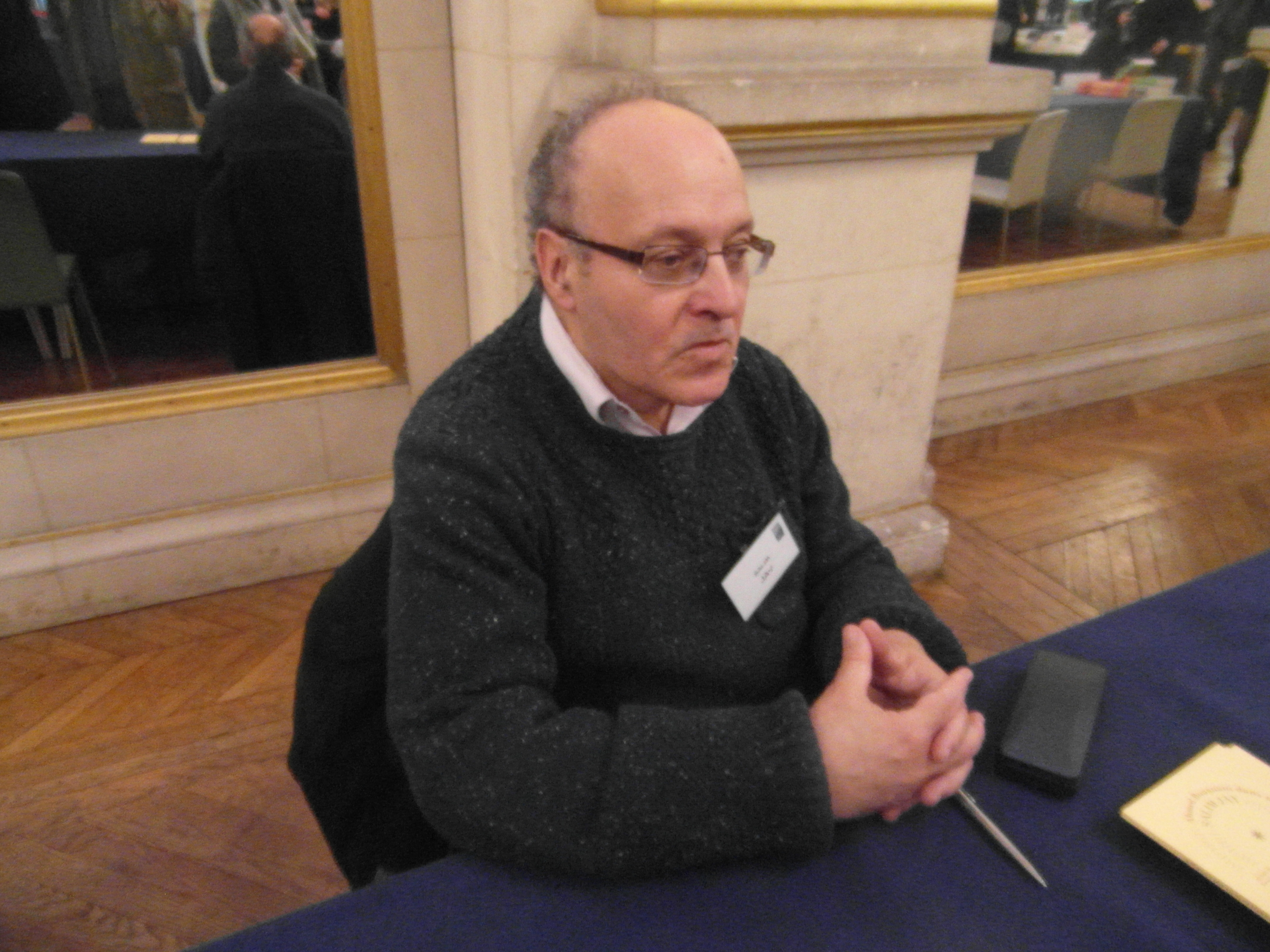
Salim Jay in February 2016

Salim Jay (born 30 June 1951) is a Franco-Moroccan novelist, essayist and literary critic living in France. He has written about 20 books, numerous essays and more than thousand newspaper articles.

His "Dictionnaire des Écrivains marocains", published in 2005 by "éditions EDDIF (Maroc)" and "Paris-Méditérannée (France)" is a biographical dictionary of Moroccan writers who have expressed themselves in French language. The book has established itself as a standard reference tool.

== Biography ==
He was born on 30 June 1951 in Paris to a Moroccan father and a Romanian mother. Salim Jay lived in Rabat from 1957 to 1973.

== Bibliography ==
- Brèves notes cliniques sur le cas Guy des Cars Barbare, 1979
- La Semaine où Madame Simone eut cent ans La Différence, 1979
- Le Fou de lecture et les quarante romans Confrontation, 1981
- Tu seras Nabab, mon fils, (sous le pseudonyme d’Irène Refrain) Rupture, 1982
- Bernard Frank Rupture 1982
- Romans maghrébins L’Afrique littéraire, 1983
- Romans du monde noir L’Afrique Littéraire, 1984
- Portrait du géniteur en poète officiel Denoël, 1985
- Idriss, Michel Tournier, et les autres La Différence, 1986
- Cent un Maliens nous manquent Arcantère, 1987
- L’Afrique de l’Occident (1887-1987) L’Afrique littéraire, 1987
- L’Oiseau vit de sa plume Belfond, 1989
- Avez-vous lu Henri Thomas ? Le Félin, 1990
- Les Écrivains sont dans leur assiette « Point Virgule », Seuil, 1991
- Starlette au haras, (sous le pseudonyme d’Alexandra Quadripley) Editions de Septembre, 1992
- Du côté de Saint-Germain-des-Prés Jacques Bertoin, 1992
- Pour Angelo Rinaldi Belles Lettres, 1994
- Jean Freustié, romancier de la sincérité Le Rocher, 1998
- Sagesse du milieu du monde Paris Méditerranée, 1999
- Tu ne traverseras pas le détroit Mille et une nuits, 2001
- Dictionnaire des écrivains marocains Paris Méditerranée - Eddif, 2005
- Embourgeoisement immédiat ed. La Différence, 2006 (see article: )
- Littératures méditerranéennes et horizons migratoires: une anthologie (in French). Casablanca; Paris: Croisée des chemins; Séguier. 2011. ISBN 978-9954-1-0344-9.
