= Nadia Chafik =

Moroccan novelist

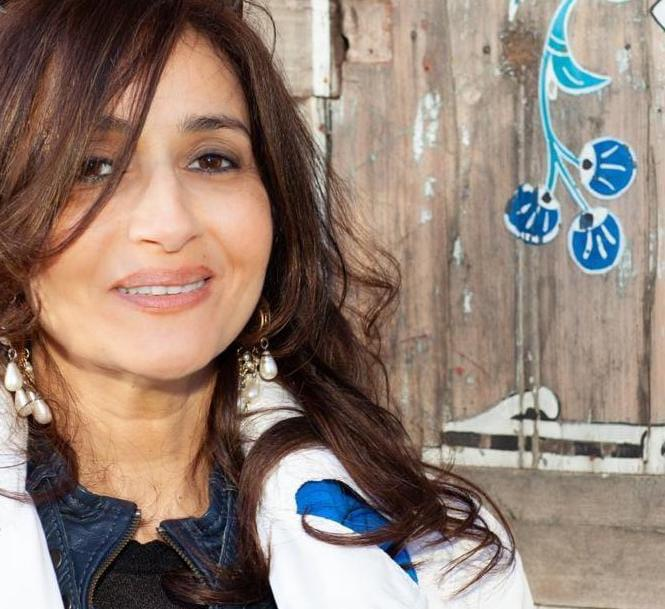
- Born: 1962 (age 63–64); Casablanca, Morocco
- Education: Université de Montréal

Nadia Chafik (born 1962, Casablanca) is a Moroccan novelist.

== Biography ==
Nadia Chafik was born in Casablanca in 1962, and grew up in Rabat. She is from the Aït Sadden tribe, a Middle Atlas Berber tribe. Chafik studied at Montreal University (Master & Ph.D) and she taught (as "Chargée de cours") in the same university during two years. Her principal academic works are: "Être romancière au Maghreb" (1988) and Une autre lecture du Maghreb à travers l'art scriptural et pictural français du 19e siècle (1998).

After teaching also at Ibn Tofaïl University of Kénitra, Nadia Chafik follows her career at Mohammed V University of Rabat where she teaches Literature and organizes some cultural activities like: "Ateliers d'écriture", or "Rencontres avec les auteurs".

She has published short stories and three novels. Nos jours aveugles (Our blind days) is her first collection of short stories. The last one is: Tête de poivre (April, 2012) for which she was nominated for the Prix Grand Atlas 2012 of French Embassy. A critic of French Institute in Morocco writes about this book: " autant de fragments de vie qui mettent à l'honneur la poésie de l'existence".

== Selected works ==
=== Books ===
- L'atelier d'écriture. Un Laboratoire à large spectre didactique, academic work, 2013
- Tête de poivre, short stories, 2012
- Nos jours aveugles, , short stories, 2005
- Chafik, Nadia (2000). À l'ombre de Jugurtha (in French). Eddif, Paris-Méditerranées. ISBN 978-2-84272-094-0.
- Le secret des djinns, novel, 1998 - A strange man story.
- Filles du vent, novel, 1995 - Madness and misfortune's single mother

=== Collections ===
- 37 printemps, Écoute retomber le silence (extract), poetry, in Mots de neige, de sable et d'Océan, 2008
- Clair-Obscur, in Regards d'enfant, 2003
- Ce pays, ne l'as-tu pas rêve ?, in Perles de l'Atlantique. Les Carnets marocains, short text, 2001
- Le Tatouage bleu, in Des Nouvelles du Maroc, 1999
- Écoute retomber le silence (extract), poetry, in Sources - Revue de la Maison de la Poésie, Namur n°18, 1997
- Entre chiens et loups, in Anthologie de la nouvelle maghrébine, 1996
- Bribes, in Liberté n°182, Montréal-Canada, 1989
