= Mouad Moutaoukil =

Moroccan French-language writer (born 1997)

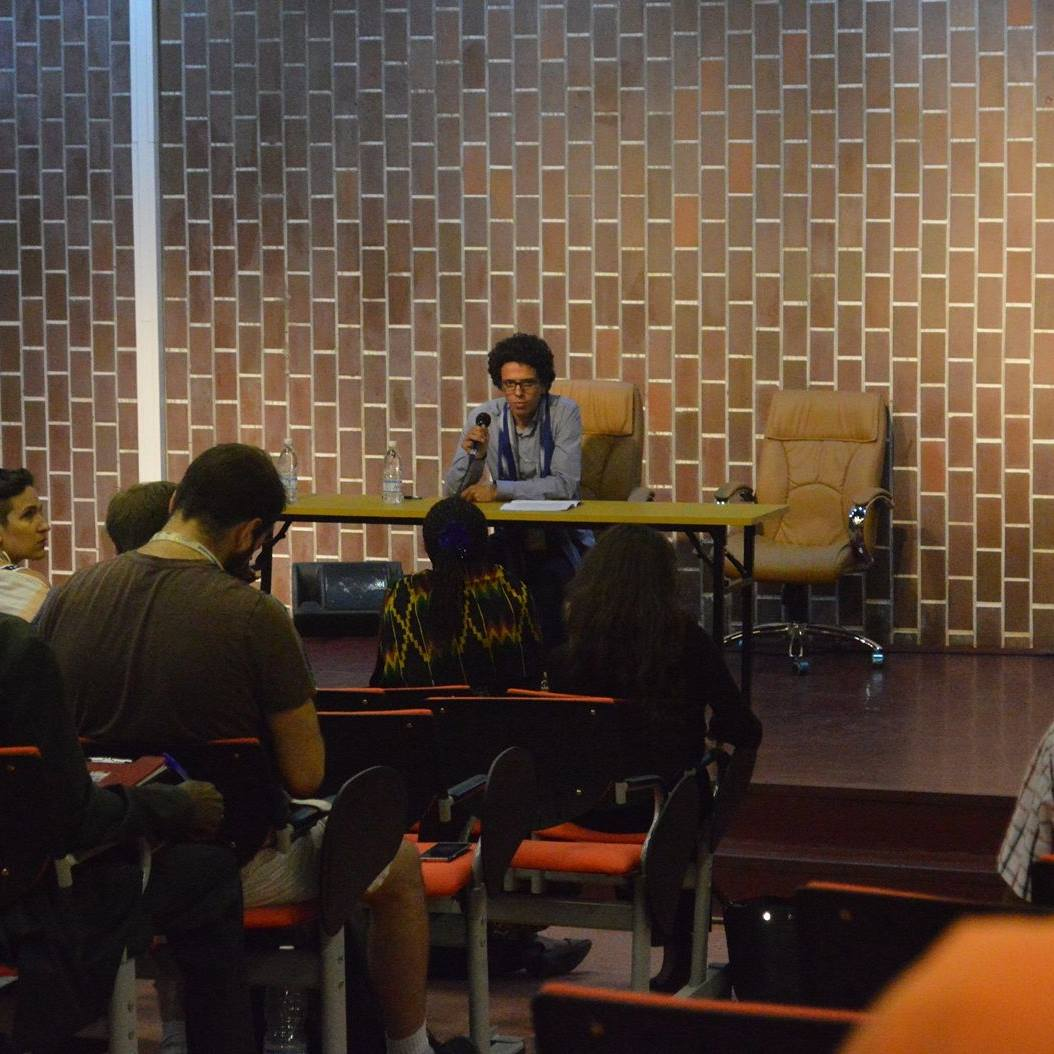
- Mouad Moutaoukil at the 2017 Jeux de la Francophonie
- Born: February 17, 1997 (age 29); Fez, Morocco
- Education: Sidi Mohamed Ben Abdellah University
- Occupations: Writer, doctor
- Writing career
- Language: French
- Genres: Short story; Poetry; Drama
- Website: mouadmoutaoukil.art

Mouad Moutaoukil (born 1997) is a Moroccan French-language writer.

== Biography ==
Mouad was born in the Moroccan city of Fez on February 17, 1997. His passion for literature appeared at an early age, he began writing short stories and poems since the age of twelve. He published his first book, Nouvelles et Acrostiches, in 2012, and his second book Poésies d'un Ado, in 2013. The young writer won several literary competitions, including: Poésie en Liberté in 2012, La Bataille des dix mots in 2014, and the Kalahari Short Story competition in 2021.

Moreover, he participated in the 56th International Mathematical Olympiad that was held in Chiang Mai in July 2015 as a member of the Moroccan national team. In 2017, the Moroccan Ministry of Culture selected him to represent Morocco in the 2017 Jeux de la Francophonie as competitor in literature, which was held in Abidjan, Ivory Coast. In August 2020, he published the play Les Trois Fresques, an invitation to reflect on individual freedoms, defying taboos about sexuality and STDs. In November 2020, he published Amours, a collection of short stories in which he questions the plurality of love.

== Works ==
- 2012: Nouvelles et Acrostiches
- 2013: Poésies d'un Ado
- 2016: Là, chez les Hommes (Éditions Edilivre)
- 2019: Corps valués locaux (ArXiv)
- 2020: Les Trois Fresques (Éditions Edilivre)
- 2020: Amours (Éditions Orion)
