= Latifa Baka =

Moroccan writer

Latifa Baka (born 1964), is a Moroccan author of novels and short stories.

She received the Moroccan Writers' Union Prize in 1992.

She teaches sociology in Agadir.

== Literary work ==
Her first collection of novels is Que faire ? (What to do?). She received the prize of the Union of Writers of Morocco in 1992 for this collection. She later wrote several novels including since this life and room of Virginia Wolff. Through her writings, the author gives a clear explanation of the impasses in Moroccan society and the obstacles to the development of women. Her works were presented as part of the ninth edition of the International Women's Film Festival in Salé, in 2015.

== Publications ==
Novel

- De Depuis ce temps-là, Ministère de la culture, Rabat, 2005.

Short stories

- Mediterraneans: Voices from Morocco (a quarterly publication, winter 1999)
- Zapatos sin tacón, an anthology of Arab female writers
