= Bahaa Trabelsi =

Moroccan writer (born 1966)

- بهاء طرابلسي
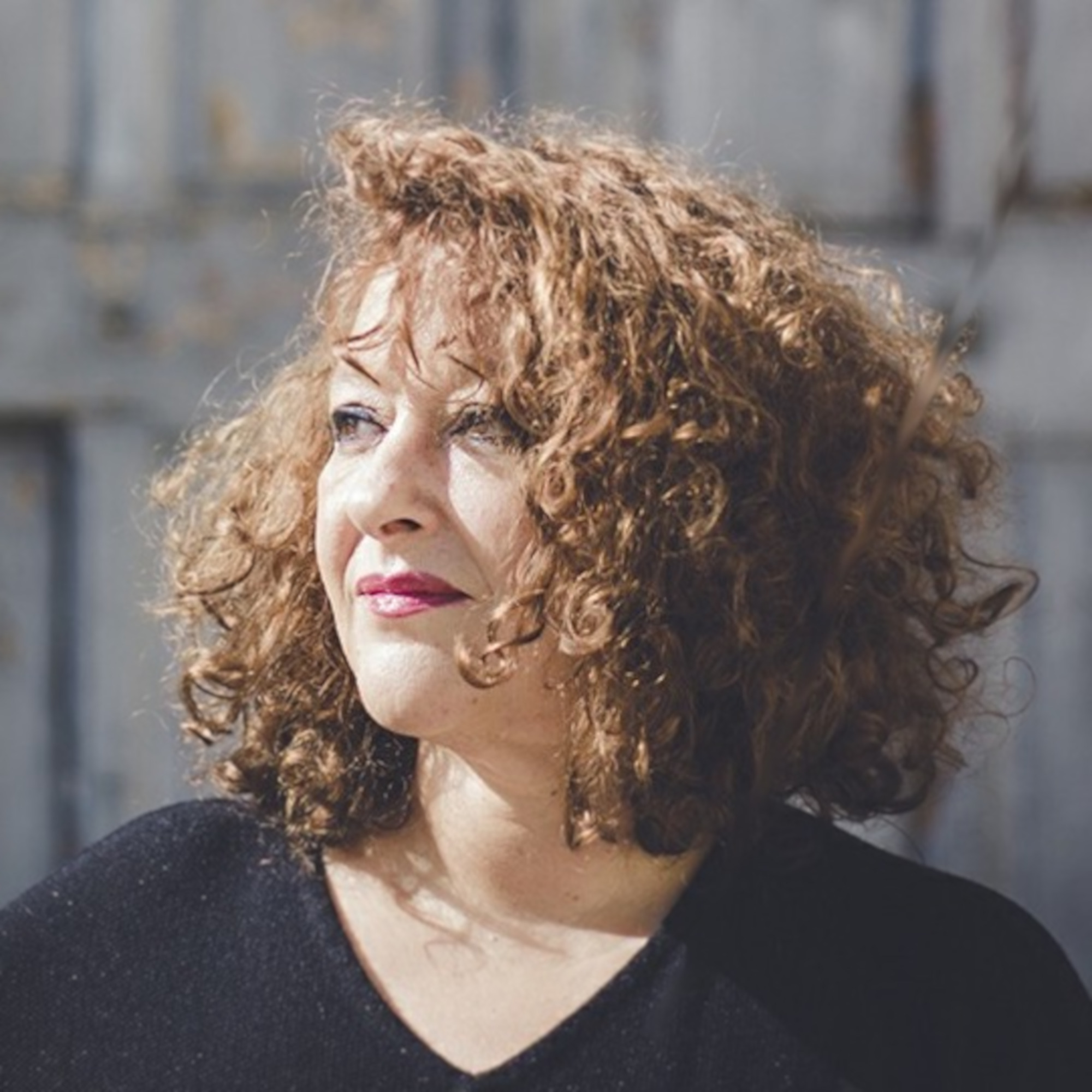
- Bahaa Trabelsi in 2019
- Born: 1966 (age 59–60); Rabat, Morocco
- Education: Aix-Marseille University
- Occupations: Author; journalist; screenwriter

Bahaa Trabelsi (Arabic: بهاء طرابلسي; born 1966) is a Moroccan novelist, journalist, and screenwriter.

Trabelsi was born in Rabat Morocco and went to secondary French school in Lycée Lyautey (Casablanca). Trabelsi left Morocco at the age of 18 for Grenoble to study economics. Thereafter her graduation in economic studies (PhD) from the university of Aix en Provence she returned to Morocco to work in a governmental agency for three years.

Trabelsi turned to journalism and worked for several Moroccan newspapers and magazines and became editor-in-chief of the Moroccan magazine Masculin.

Bahaa Trabelsi is a prominent member of an AIDS association, an active member of civil society a feminist and has participated in the creation of several associations, including Women and Development.

She is the author of seven successful novels Une femme tout simplement (1995). Une Vie à trois (2000). Slim (2005). Parlez-moi d'amour! (2014). La chaise du concierge (2017). Souviens toi qui tu es (2019).Dialogue joyeux avec un mort (2022).

In 2014, Bahaa Trabelsi received the Ivoire Literary Award, for her novel Parlez-moi d'amour!.

In 2017, The Keeper's Chair, her fifth novel, won the 2017 Sofitel Literary Award.

In 2018, the novel La Chaise du Concierge is translated into Italian by Editions Le Assassine in Italy.

In 2022, Bahaa Trabelsi was appointed president of the Moroccan Film Center's national film production fund commission.

== Books ==
- A woman simply (Une Femme tout simplement), 1995.
- A three life (Une vie à trois), 1999.
- Slim, women and death (Slim, les femmes et la mort), 2005.
- Parlez-moi d'Amour !, 2014.
- The keeper's chair (La Chaise du concierge), 2017.
- Remember who you are (Souviens-toi qui tu es), 2019.
- Joyful dialogue with a dead man (Dialogue joyeux avec un mort), 2022.
