= Touria Oulehri =

Moroccan writer

- Born: 1962 (age 63–64); Assoul, Morocco
- Occupations: Novelist; academic

Touria Oulehri (Arabic: تورية أولهري; born 1962) is a Moroccan novelist and academic. Her novels focus on the experiences and challenges faced by Moroccan women.

== Life and career ==
Oulehri was born in the village of Assoul, Morocco. She attended secondary school in Meknès, followed by higher education in Fez and France. She holds a degree in public law and a doctorate in French literature.

She has worked as a teacher at the École Normale Supérieure in Meknès, and as an academic of French literature. She has published articles on the subject of literary criticism and authors of the 16th century. She is one of a group of Francophone Moroccan women writers who began writing in the 1980s and 1990s, despite Moroccan literature having traditionally been a masculine field, and whose work is characterised by themes of feminism and socio-political concerns.

Oulehri's first novel, La répudiée was published in 2001. It is about an upper-class and cultured Moroccan woman unable to have children; her husband first encourages her to agree to a polygamous marriage and then abandons her when she refuses consent. Oulehri draws comparisons between the destruction of the main character's life and the 1960 Agadir earthquake, yet the events also provide her with an opportunity to rebuild a better life. The novel caused some controversy in Morocco for its depiction of a woman who seeks fulfilment from life without motherhood or a male partner.

Feminist themes and women's experiences have continued to be features of her later novels; for example, in Les Conspirateurs sont parmi nous (2006), the young main character has received no education about her body and is unsettled by menstruation as a result. In 2019 her novel Aime-moi et je te tue was presented at the Casablanca International Book Fair.

In a 2007 interview, Oulehri was asked for whom she and other Moroccan authors write, given low levels of literacy in the country. She responded, "nous écrivons pour nous-mêmes et personne d'autre" (we write for ourselves and no one else).

== Books ==
- La répudiée (Afrique-Orient, 2001)
- La Chambre des nuits blanches (Marsam, 2004)
- Les Conspirateurs sont parmi nous (Marsam, 2006)
- Laisse mon corps te dire (Marsam, 2016)
- Aime-moi et je te tue (Virgule, 2019)
