= Hourya Benis Sinaceur =

Moroccan philosopher

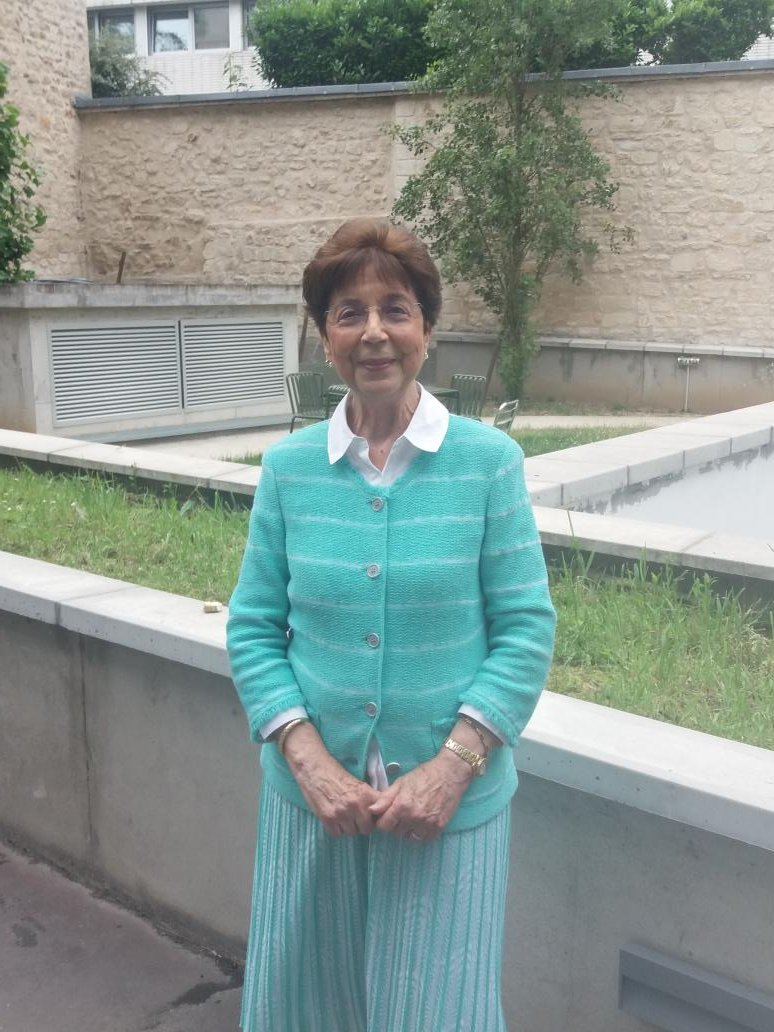
Hourya Benis Sinaceur

Hourya Sinaceur is a Moroccan philosopher. She is an expert in the theory and history of mathematics.

== Biography ==
Hourya Benis was born in 1940 in Casablanca in Morocco. Sinaceur worked for Paris-Sorbonne University and the French National Centre for Scientific Research which is also in Paris, and the URS in Rabat. She has also served as a member of the National French Committee of History and Philosophy of Science (Comité National Francais d'Histoire et de Philosophie des Sciences.

== Books ==
She is the author of the book Corps et Modèles (1991), translated into English as Field and Models: From Sturm to Tarski and Robinson (Birkhauser, 2003). and of Functions and Generality of Logic: Reflections on Dedekind's and Frege's logicisms (Springer, 2015).
