= Fouzia Rhissassi =

Moroccan professor of social sciences

Fouzia Rhissassi (Arabic: فوزية رساسي; born April 15, 1947) is a Moroccan professor of social sciences at the faculty of arts at Ibn Tofail University in Kenitra, Morocco. Currently she holds a position of the UNESCO Chair on Women Rights.

== Biography ==
Fouzia Rhissassi was born in Fes, Morocco on April 15, 1947.

Rhissassi has been teaching since 1974. She supervised numerous B.A, M.A and Ph.D. theses throughout her career.

With her work in women’s studies and peace for/in the Arab world, Prof. Rhissassi has written numerous publications: co-director of Pulpit UNESCO "The Woman and Her Rights" with Abderrazak Moulayrohid in 2004, "Moroccan Women Writers of Arabic Expression", and Gender Studies: "core educational concepts, values and operations for ensuring sustainable societies; the case of Morocco". In addition to writing numerous publications she has also participated in several events as either a speaker or delegate with regards to her expertise.

== Publications ==
- La citoyenneté féminine au Maroc ("Women and citizenship in Morocco")
- Le discours sur la femme, Fouzia Rhissassi (ed.), Rabat, 1998
- Images de femmes: regards de société, (with Khadija Amiti), 2004
- Femmes et etat de droit: actes du Colloque International organisé les 19 et 20 Avril 2002 à la Faculté de Droit Souissi, Rabat - Maroc. (with Abderrazak Moulay Rachid)
- A textual study of Thomas Hardy's Life's little ironies, Faculté des lettres et des sciences humaines, Université Mohammed V, Rabat, 1994
- Stéréotypie, images et représentations des femmes en milieu rural et/ou urbain (with Leila Messaoudi), Fennec, 2008.
- Les cahiers du genre (with Isabelle Jacquet). Éditions le fennec, 2007.

== Awards and honors ==
- Award 2006 in the category of Human Rights (the award is given annually to prominent Moroccan women for their achievements)
- The Wissam of the Alouite Throne, 1993
- The title of the chevalier de l’ordre de la Couronne by his Majesty King Albert II, 2004, Belgium
- Gold Leaf of the embassy of Canada in Morocco, 2007
