= Abu Mohammed al-Qasim al-Sijilmasi =

Abu Mohammed al-Qasim al-Sijilmasi (Arabic: أبو محمد القاسم السجلماسي; died 1304) was an important literary scholar from Morocco and the author of Al-Manza al-badi fi tagnis asalib al-badi (The Striking Course in Categorising the Forms of the Rhetorical Figures). In this book of literary theory he classifies the figures of speech under ten main categories and various sub-categories.
