= Mohammed ibn al-Tayyib =

Music theorist

Mohammed bin al-Tayyib محمد بن الطيب

Personal life
- Born: 1698 Fes, Morocco
- Died: 1756 (aged 57–58) Medina, Ottoman Empire (Modern-day Saudi Arabia)
- Main interest(s): Linguistics, History, Islamic jurisprudence, Hadith
- Notable work(s): Rihla ila al-Hijaz, Commentary on Sahih al-Bukhari
- Occupation: Scholar, Historian, Linguist

Religious life
- Religion: Islam
- Denomination: Sunni
- Creed: Maliki

Senior posting
- Influenced by: Bu 'Isami

Mohammed bin al-Tayyib (Arabic: محمد بن الطيب) or Abu Abdallah Mohammed bin Mohammed bin Musa bin Mohammed al-Sharqi al-Sumayli ibn Tayyib al-Fasi al-Alami (1698–1756) was a famous Moroccan linguist, historian and scholar of fikh (law) and hadith. He is the author of sixteen books on grammar and morphology, nine books on lexicography, many books on quranic interpretation and exegesis, hadith, sufism, fiqh and biographies of famous poets and scholars of Al-Andalus. He also wrote The Companion of the Performer (al-Anis al-Mutrib). One of his many teachers was the music theorist Bu 'Isami (d. ca. 1103 AH/1690 AD). Ibn al-Tayyib is the author of a well known rihla, Rihla ila al-Hijaz.

== Works ==
Quranic Interpretation or Exegesis

- Hawashi al-Jalalayn
- Hawashi al-Baydawi
- Hawashf al- Kashshaf

Hadith

- Hawashi al-Qastalani
- Uyun al-Mawarid al-Salsalah min Uyun al-Asanid al-Musalsalah
- Tamhid al-Dalail wa talkhis al-Awail

Biography (in the field of religious studies)

- Samt al-Faraid
- Risalah fi mana'al as-Salat ala al-Rasul
- al-lstisha bima fi dhat al-Shifa fi Sirah al-Nabi- thumma al Khulafa
- Sharh sirah Ibn Faris
- Hawashi al-Shamail

Sufism

- Sharh al-Hizb al-Nawawi

Fiqh

- Fatawa
- al-Istimsak Urwah fi al-Ahkam al-Mutaallaqah bi al-Qahwa
- al-Taliqat al-Fiqhiyya
- Hawashi al-Mahalli

Biographies (in the field of history)

- Al-Anis Al-Mutrib Fiman laqaynahu min Udaba al-Maghrib
- Al-Ufuq al-Mushriq bi Tarajum Man Laqaynahu bi al-Mashriq
- Irsal al-Asanid wa Isal al-Musannafat wa al-Ajzawa al-Masanid
- Iqrar Al-Ayn bi Iqrar al-Athar bad Dhihab al-Ayn
- Al-Azhar al-Nadiyyah fi al-Tarikh

Grammar and Morphology

- Hashiya ala al-Muradi
- Hashiya ala al-Mughni
- Hashiya ala al-Tasrih
- Sharh al-Ashbah wa al-Nazair
- Hashiya al-Makudi
- Faydal-Inshirah min Rawd Tayy al-Iqtirah
- Sharh Lamiyah al-Afalli Ibn Malik
- Hashiyah ala Sharhal-Ajrumiyah
- Iqamat al-Burhan ala anna al-Afal al-Naqisah Innama Tadullu ala al-Zaman
- Hawashi al-Tahsil
- Hawashi al-Tawdih
- Hawashi ala Sharh al-Qawa'id
- Sharh Kafiyah
- Hawashi Sharh Lamiyya al-Afal
- Risalah fi Halumma Jarra
- Sharh al-Kafiyah

Lexicography

- Al-Musfir an Khabaya al-Muzhir
- Idaait al-Ramus wa Idafat al-Namus ala lda'at al-Qamus
- Hashiyah ala Durarat al-Ghawwas fi Awham al-Khawwas
- Mawti'at al-Fasih li Muwata'at al-Fasih
- Tahrir al-Riwayah fi taqrir al-Kifayah
- Daws al-Qabus fi Zawaid al-Sihah ala al-Qamus
- Hawashi al-Rawd al-Masluf
- Hawashi Shifa al-Ghalil
- Tadhkarah

Literature and literary Studies

- Isfar al-Litham an Mahya Shawahid Ibn Hisham
- Hawashi ala Sharh Uqud al-Juman
- Qasidah Raiyyah fi madh al-Rasul alayhi al-salam
- Diwan Shi'r
- Takhlis al-Takhlis min Shawahid Al-Talkhis
- Anwa' al-Anwar fi Sharh Shawahid al-Kashshaf wa al-Anwar
- Shari al-Qasida al-Madariya
- Sharh Dawawin al-Shuara al-Sittah
- Sharh Shawahid al-Ri'di
- Sharh al-Muallaqat
- Maalayhi al-Maul min Mabahith al-Sayyid al-Matuf
- Hawashi al-Mukhtasar
- al-Mafrud fi ilm al-Qawafi wa al-Urud
- Hawashi Sharh Zakariya li al-Khazrajiyyah
- al-Rihla al-Hijaziyya
- al-Rihla al-Badia
- al-Rihla al-Mashriqiyyah
