= Ibn al-Wannan =

Moroccan writer

Ibn al-Wannan ابن الونّان
- Died: 1773; Fes, Morocco
- Occupation: Poet

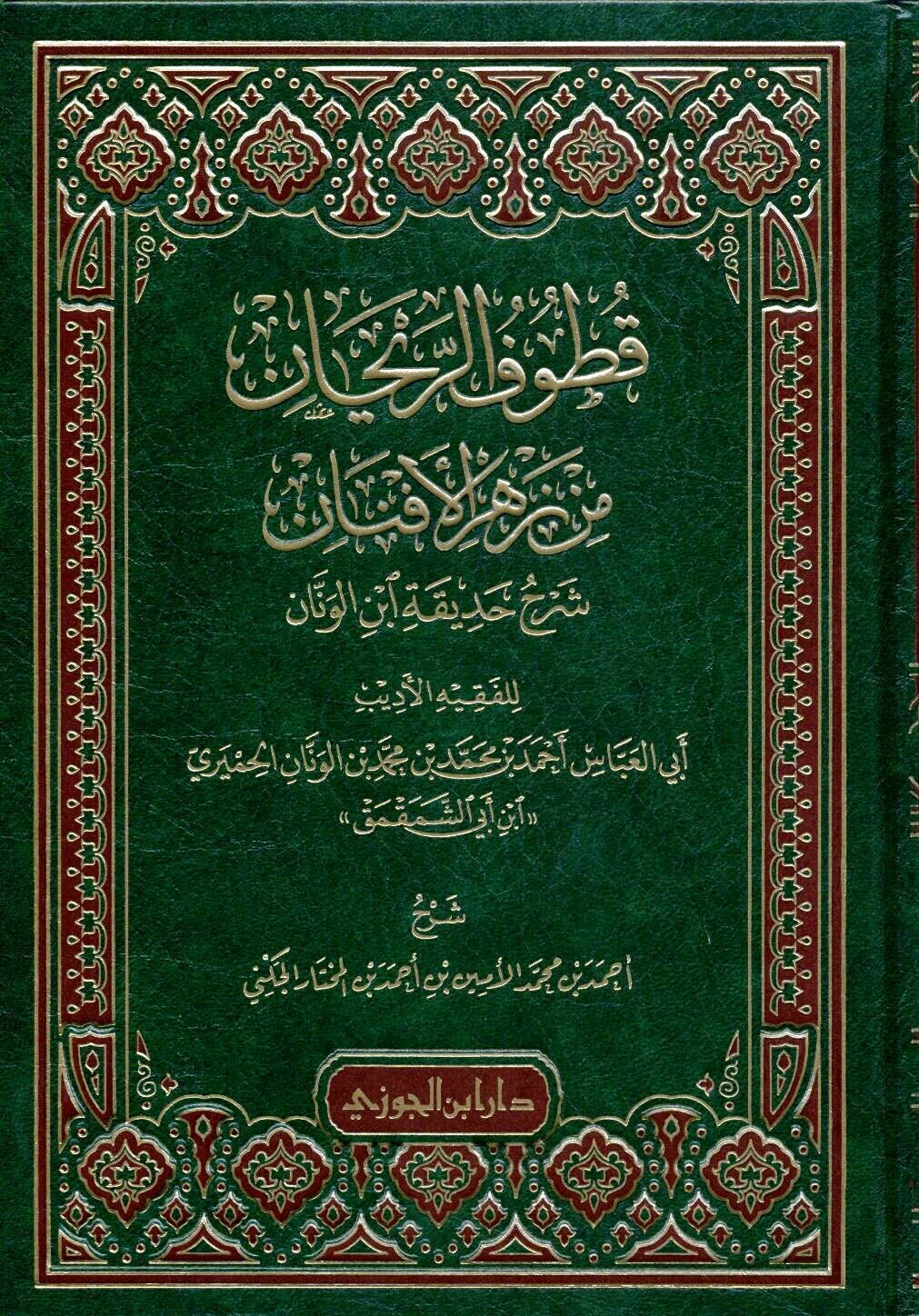
Cover of the book Qutuf al-Marjan, which is al-Shinqiti’s abridgment of the commentary by al-Nasiri known as Zahr al-Afnan min Hadiqat Ibn al-Wannan

Abu al-Abbas Ahmad ibn Muhammad ibn al-Wannan (Arabic: أبوالعباس أحمد بن محمد بن الونّان) (fl. Fez, died 1773) was a Moroccan poet. His fame was based on his poem al-Shamaqmaqiyya, a survey of traditional Arabic culture in which he described the customs of the early Arabs. He is said to have been a member of an Arab family from the Tuwāt in southern Algeria and Morocco. Ibn al-Wannan also described himself as Ḥimyari, and claimed descent from the Anṣār.

== Bibliography ==
- E.J. van Donzel Islamic Desk Reference p. 162, leiden: Brill, 1992 ISBN 90-04-09738-4
- GAL II, 615; suppl. II, 706
