= Malika Moustadraf =

Moroccan Arabic-language writer

Malika Moustadraf (Arabic: مليكة مستظرف; June 20, 1969 – September 9, 2006) was a Moroccan Arabic-language writer. She is best known for her pioneering short stories and women's rights activism, which set her squarely in Morocco's feminist vanguard. Before her early death at age 37, she published a novel, Jirah al-ruh wa-l-jasad, and the story collection Trente-Six.

== Early life ==
Malika Moustadraf was born in 1969 into a Muslim family in Casablanca, Morocco, where she lived throughout her life. In her teenage years she developed kidney disease, which prevented her from completing university.

== Career ==
Moustadraf published her first book, the novel Jirah al-ruh wa-l-jasad ("Wounds of the Soul and the Body"), in 1999. This early work, which was self-published, is considered less sophisticated than her later writing. It deals with the traumas that women and girls face under the patriarchy and how women come to support each other through it; the researcher Alice Guthrie identified a "strong yet delicate and understated queer sensibility" in the text.

Her first and only short story collection, Trente-Six, was published in 2004. It was released with the support of the University of Hassan II Casablanca's Moroccan Short Story Research Group.

Moustadraf also published short stories and articles in periodicals. Her short stories are considered forerunners of the genre in Morocco. She wrote in Arabic, and increasingly incorporated elements of vernacular Maghrebi Arabic as she progressed as a writer. She has been described as a "maverick" and a "feminist icon in contemporary Moroccan literature." Moustadraf's role as a feminist writer and activist placed her within the country's feminist vanguard, drawing both support and backlash for her work. Her story "Just Different" is also thought to be one of the first examples of Arabic-language literary fiction to center an intersex or transgender character.

== Death and legacy ==
Moustadraf's career as a writer is thought to have led to the progression of her chronic illness, as she began to cut back on her medications in order to fund her writing. After an unsuccessful kidney transplant from her sister in 1990, she sought another transplant or treatment abroad but was unable to obtain adequate care. She died in 2006 at only 37 years old.

At the time of her death, she was planning to co-author a novel with Aida Nasrallah, a Palestinian feminist writer. Her final short stories were published posthumously in a literary magazine, and both her novel and short story collection were reissued by an Egyptian publisher in 2020. Despite her short life and relatively small bibliography, her writing is considered a "cult-classic" that left an indelible mark on the Moroccan literary scene, and various writing centers and awards have been named in her honor.

In 2022, her complete short stories were published in English translation by Alice Guthrie under the title Blood Feast in the United States and Something Strange, Like Hunger elsewhere.

== Selected works ==
=== In Arabic ===
- Jirah al-ruh wa-l-jasad ("Wounds of the Soul and the Body," 1999, novel)
- Trente-Six ("36," 2004, short stories)

=== In English translation ===
- Blood Feast (2022, complete stories)
