= Rajae Benchemsi =

Moroccan writer

Rajae Benchemsi (born 1957 in Meknes) is a Moroccan writer. Benchemsi studied literature in Paris and wrote her thesis on Maurice Blanchot. She has published collections of poetry in Morocco and in France Fracture du désir, a collection of articles published by Actes Sud in 1998. In 2006, she wrote 'Houda et Taqi'. Rajae Benchemsi is also the host of a Moroccan television program on books.

== Bibliography ==
- Marrakech, lumière d'exil: roman, ed. Wespieser, 2003 ISBN 2-84805-006-3
- Fracture du désir, ed. Actes Sud, 1999 ISBN 2-7427-2161-4
- La controverse des temps: roman, ed. Wespieser, 2006 ISBN 2-84805-041-1
- (together with Fraid Belkahia) Parole de Nuit, Marsam 1997, ISBN 9981-9723-7-1
