= Wafaa Lamrani =

Moroccan poet (born 1960)

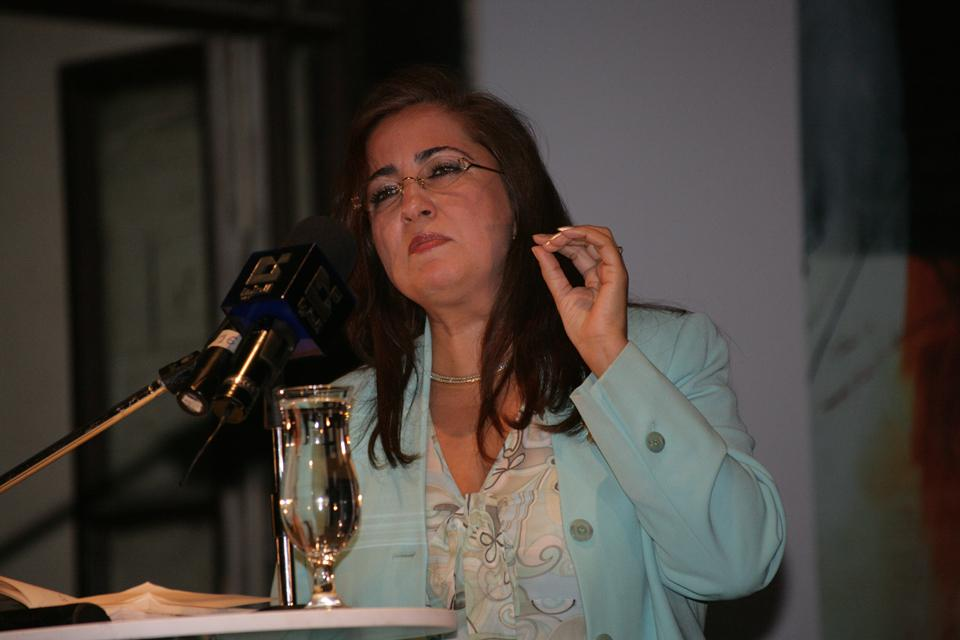
Image of Wafaa Lamrani

Wafaa Lamrani (born 1960, in Ksar el-Kebir) is a Moroccan poet. She was featured with two poems, The Wail of Heights and I am Consecrated to the Coming One in The Poetry of Arab Women: A Contemporary Anthology, and she was one of the five women poets featured in La carte poétique du Maroc.

== Sources ==
- Laabi, Abdellatif (editor), La carte poétique du Maroc
- Handal, Nathalie (editor), The Poetry of Arab Women: A Contemporary Anthology, Interlink Publishing Group Inc., December 2000 ISBN 1-56656-374-7
