= Leila Lahlou =

Moroccan writer

Leila Lahlou (Arabic: ليلة لحلو) is a Moroccan writer.

She is the author of the autobiographical account Do Not Forget God, originally published in Arabic. The book was published in 1987 in Casablanca, Morocco. Do Not Forget God is a first person account of a woman's struggle with breast cancer and her subsequent mystical experience.

The book is a journey of spiritual salvation and a frank discussion of the female body. In the book, the main character graphically describes her body as she examines herself for signs of cancer, which doctors say is consuming her. Left with little hope in medicine, she finds herself cured after dreaming that the Prophet Mohammed touched her. The author is redefining the Islamic tradition of religious literature.

"She is forcing you to look at her body," Moroccan literature specialist Malti-Douglas says. "There is a constant invitation to readers to look at her body. I don't know of any other text that is so powerful."

Leila Lahlou is one of the women writers that are expanding the limits of the role of the female body and the female spiritual experience in Islamic literature.
