= Siham Benchekroun =

Moroccan novelist and poet

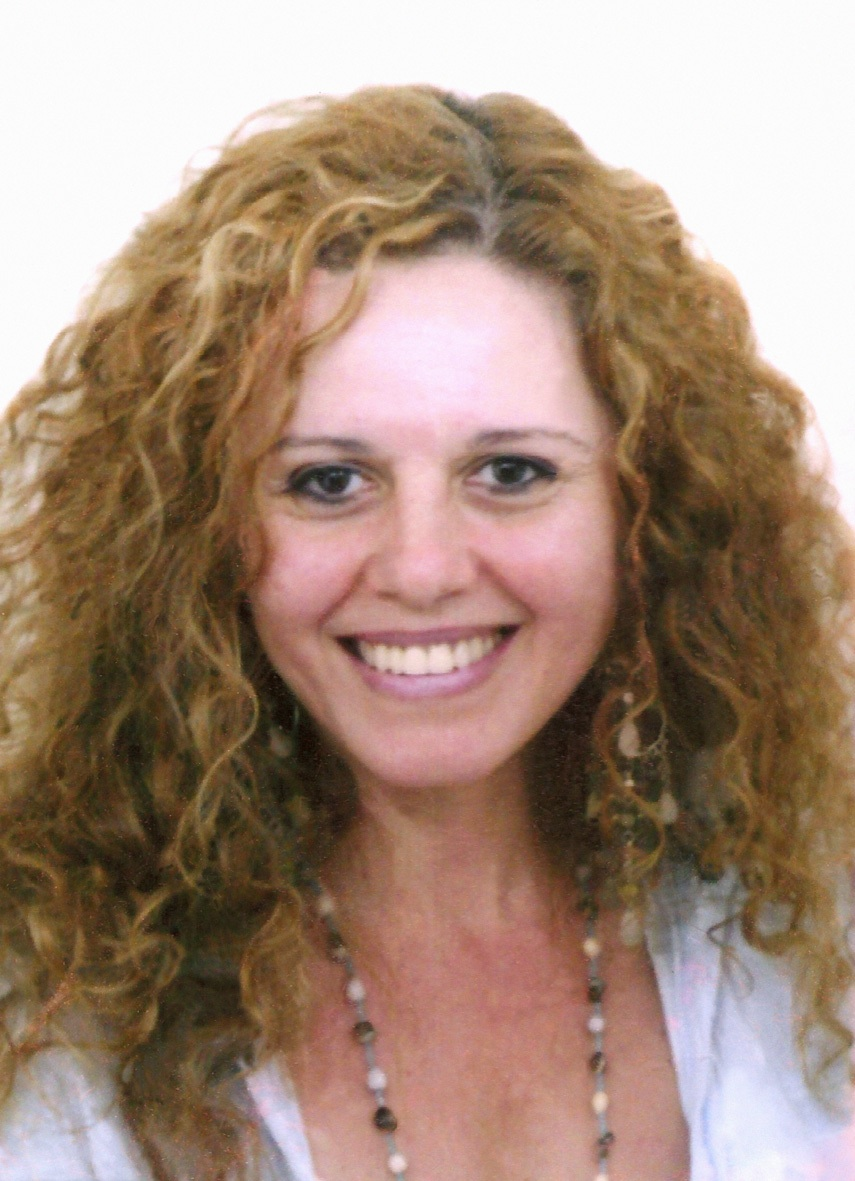
- Citizenship: Morocco

Siham Benchekroun is a Moroccan novelist and poet. She is a physician, psychotherapist, researcher and community activist for women in vulnerable situations. She is also a writer who has published short stories and social novels. Her writing and speeches focus on the status of women in Morocco.

«The best ideas can remain at the indeterminate stage of projects if they are not supported, especially at a material level. The project on inheritance in Morocco, led and published by Empreintes Editions in the form of 3 books: French (The Legacy of Women), English (Women Inheritance) and Arabic (Mirath An-Nissae), must therefore a lot, not only to the team of authors and translators who have committed themselves to it, but also to the sponsors who are involved in the financing. Among them, the AJIAL Foundation was our main partner. We thank the steering committee for believing in us and for accompanying us in this triple edition.»

In 2017, she initiated, directed and published her first essay, a collective book on the issue of Muslim women's inheritance and chose Morocco as a basis for study and reference. Entitled "Women's Heritage, Multidisciplinary Reflection on Inheritance in Morocco", it will be published in Arabic simultaneously with the French edition "Mirath An-Nissae", then in English "Women's inheritance" in 2018. This project involved 23 experts from various disciplines (theology, legal sciences, political sciences, economics, psychology, sociology, anthropology, educational sciences) as well as 15 translators. It was widely publicized and relayed by the Moroccan and international press.

== Bibliography ==
- Oser vivre, roman, Casablanca: Eddif, 1999, 272 pages. Published in Arabic, Editions Empreintes, 2002, translation by Abdelhadi Idrissi, 288 pages.
- A toi, poems (bilingual), Casablanca: Editions Empeintes, 2000, 88 pages.
- Les Jours d’ici, short stories, Casablanca: Editions Empreintes, 2003.
