= Hafsa Bekri =

Moroccan poet and writer of a book of short stories

Hafsa Bekri-Lamrani (born 1948) is a Moroccan poet and writer of a book of short stories, Jellabiates (2001). She published: Tendresse et autres lumières and Sparks of Life, two collections of poetry at Aïni Bennai editions, Casablanca (2004). In 2021 she published Et pourtant elle rêve, a novel in French.She was invited for a writing residence in 2002 in England (Art-UK - Writing on the Wall) in Hadrian's Wall region where there were Moroccans at the beginning of the second century. A journal of this residence is published on the net: Berbers in Solway: Journal of a Moroccan poet. In 2009 she published The call of Hagar in Women writing Africa, The Northern Region (Feminist Press New York.) She is a member of the Centre d’études et de recherche sur la Méditerranée and of the Medina Sociocultural association. She was a nominee in 2012 for the Moroccan Women Mentoring and Networking Award.

She lives in Casablanca, where she retired as an English Teacher . She is a founding member of the first House of Poetry in Morocco and of the Center for Mediterranean Center and In 2001 became a member of the Union of Moroccan Writers.

In 1995 Hafsa participated in the 4th Conference on Women in Beijing where she presented a research paper entitled : "Signs and Sounds of Maghrebi Women".

Hafsa had a writing residence in April 2002 in Bowness on Solway, which had originally been a site where Moroccan Auxiliaries had been stationed with Roman Emperor Hadrian. She explored the landscape, grew to know the local people and commented on this small Cumbrian Village's culture, and friendliness. She also gave readings in local Primary Schools and helped to further cement Anglo-Moroccan relations, in a time of heightened tension.
