= Thouria Saqqat =

Touria Sekkat (Arabic: ثريا السقاط; 1935 Fes - Paris 1992) was a Moroccan writer of children's books. She worked as a teacher in Casablanca.

== Books ==
- Al-Labu´a al-bayd:â´ al-Nasr al-ramâdî H:iwâr ma'a al-amwâdj y Fât:ima al-mafdjű'a, Casablanca: Manshűrât Dâr al-At:fâl, 1988 (fairy tales)
- Manâdîl wa-qud:bân. Rasâ´il al-sidjn, Casablanca: Dâr al-Nashr al-Magribiyya, 1988.
- Ugniyât jâridh al-zamân, Casablanca: 'Uyűn al-Maqâlât, 1990. (songs)
