= Ali ibn Qasim al-Zaqqaq =

Writer

Personal life
- Born: Ali ibn Qasim al-Zaqqaq; 1506/07; Fez, Morocco
- Main interest(s): Maliki common law, Judicial procedures
- Notable work(s): Lamiyat al-Zaqqaq (Lamia fi al-Ahkam); al-Manhaj al-muntakhab; al-Lulu al-masun fi sadaf al-qawaid al-uyun

Religious life
- Religion: Islam
- Denomination: Sunni
- Jurisprudence: Maliki

Ali ibn al-Qasim al-Zaqqaq (Arabic: علي بن قاسم الزقاق; died 1506/7), from Fes, Morocco is one of the most important authors in the field of Maliki common law. He is the author of the well-known Lamiyat al- Zaqqaq (the popular title of Lamia fi al-Ahkam), a textbook on judicial procedures (Amal). al-Manhaj al-muntakhab is another work by al-Zaqqaq on Maliki fiqh. al-Lulu al-masun fi sadaf al-qawaid al-uyun (written in 1815-16) is the verse summary of al-Zaqqaq's, al-Manhaj al-muntakhab and the commentary of Ahmed Mohammed al-Maqqari (1632) upon it.

== See also ==
- Mohammed al-Qasim al-Sijilmasi
