= Alami =

Alami (also spelled el-Alami, al-Alami, El Alami, Elalamy; Arabic: العلمي) is a Moroccan surname. Notable people with the surname include:

- Abd al-Salam ibn Mashish al-Alami (died 1227), Moroccan Sufi saint
- Abu Bakr al-Alami al-Idrissi (died 10th-century AD), Moroccan religious leader
- Lalla Aicha bint Ali ibn Rashid al-Alami (1485 – 14 July 1561), Governor of Tétouan between 1515–1542 and a Moroccan privateer
- Ali ibn Rashid al-Alami, was the founder of the city of Chefchaouen, Morocco
- Amal ibn Idris al-Alami (born 1950), Moroccan physician, neurosurgeon and writer
- Faidi al-Alami, Mayor of Jerusalem from 1906 to 1909
- Moulay Hafid Elalamy (born 1960), Moroccan businessman and politician
- Idriss ibn al-Hassan al-Alami (1925–2007), Moroccan poet and translator
- Karim Alami (born 1973), Moroccan tennis player
- Laila Lalami (born 1968), Moroccan-American novelist, essayist, and professor
- Lamis al-Alami (born 1943), Palestinian educator and politician
- Mohammed al-Harraq al-Alami (1772–1845), Moroccan poet and Islamic religious leader
- Mohammed ibn Mohammed Alami (1932–1993), Moroccan poet
- Musa Alami (1897–1984), Palestinian nationalist and politician
- Nadia Lalami (born 1990), Moroccan tennis player.
- Qaddur al-Alami (1742–1850), Moroccan songwriter and poet
- Raghib al-Alami, Mayor of Gaza from 1965 to 1971
- Saad al-Alami (1911–1993), Palestinian Sunni Muslims and the fourth Grand Mufti of Jerusalem
- Salima El Ouali Alami (born 1983), Moroccan athlete
- Saifeddine Alami (born 1992), Moroccan footballer
- Younes Lalami Laaroussi (born 2001), Moroccan tennis player

See also

- El Alami Group, Companie of Morocco
- Khatib and Alami, planning, architectural and engineering consulting company
