= July 9 =

July 9 this year in various calendars
- Thursday, 9 July 2026
Akan	Monoyaw
Armenian	24 Hrotich 1475
Aztec	Tepeilhuitl 20, 12 Tōchtli
Babylonian	23 Simanu, 2337 SE
Balinese pawukon	Luang, Pepet, Kajeng, Laba, Paing, Maulu, Wraspati of Medangsia, Brahma, Gigis, Raja
Bengali	25 Asharh, BS 1433
Chinese	Yang Wood Monkey・Legs Mansion; Fire Horse Year, Month 5, Day 25 (Xiaoshu, 14 days until Dashu)
Common Era	9 July 2026 CE
Coptic	2 Epip, AM 1742
Egyptian	24 Athyr, 2775 NE
Ethiopian	2 Ḥamlē, 2018 Amätä Məhrät
French Republican	Décade III, Primidi de Messidor de l'Année 234 de la République
Gregorian	9 July, AD 2026
Hebrew	24 Tamuz, AM 5786
Hindu	Aśvinī・Sukarman; Solar: 25 Āṣāḍha, 1948 SE; Lunisolar: Daśamī, Kṛishna pakṣa of Jyeṣṭha, 2083 VE; Rāudra・5127 KY・1,872,765
Icelandic	Fimmtudagur, 18 Sólmánuður 2026
Islamic	23 Muharram, AH 1448 (using tabular method)
ISO week date	2026-W28-4
Japanese	25 Satsuki, Reiwa 8 (Shōsho, 14 days until Taisho)
Julian	26 June, AD 2026 (AM 7534)
Julian day	2461231
Korean	25 Maldal, 4359 DE
Maya	13.0.13.13.8; 1 Xul, 12 Lamat
Roman	ante diem VI Kalendas Iulias, MMDCCLXXIX AUC
Solar Hijri	18 Tir, SH 1405
Tibetan	24 snron, me pho rta 2153 or 1772 or 1000

<<	July					>>
Su	Mo	Tu	We	Th	Fr	Sa
			1	2	3	4
5	6	7	8	9	10	11
12	13	14	15	16	17	18
19	20	21	22	23	24	25
26	27	28	29	30	31
2026

July 9 in recent years
2026 (Thursday)
2025 (Wednesday)
2024 (Tuesday)
2023 (Sunday)
2022 (Saturday)
2021 (Friday)
2020 (Thursday)
2019 (Tuesday)
2018 (Monday)
2017 (Sunday)

July 9 is the 190th day of the year (191st in leap years) in the Gregorian calendar; 175 days remain until the end of the year.

== Events ==
=== Pre-1600 ===
- 118 – Hadrian, who became emperor a year previously on Trajan's death, makes his entry into Rome.
- 381 – The end of the First Council of Christian bishops convened in Constantinople by the Roman emperor Theodosius I.
- 455 – The elderly noble Avitus is proclaimed Roman emperor by Gothic king Theoderic II in Toulouse.
- 491 – Odoacer makes a night assault with his Heruli guardsmen, engaging Theoderic the Great in Ad Pinetam. Both sides suffer heavy losses, but in the end Theodoric forces Odoacer back into Ravenna.
- 551 – A major earthquake strikes Beirut, triggering a devastating tsunami that affects the coastal towns of Byzantine Phoenicia, causing thousands of deaths.
- 660 – Silla forces under general Kim Yu-sin defeat the army of Baekje at the Battle of Hwangsanbeol.
- 869 – The 8.4–9.0 M_{w} Sanriku earthquake strikes the area around Sendai in northern Honshu, Japan. Inundation from the tsunami extended several kilometers inland.
- 969 – The Fatimid general Jawhar leads the Friday prayer in Fustat in the name of Caliph al-Mu'izz li-Din Allah, thereby symbolically completing the Fatimid conquest of Egypt.
- 1357 – Emperor Charles IV assists in laying the foundation stone of Charles Bridge in Prague.
- 1386 – The Old Swiss Confederacy makes great strides in establishing control over its territory by soundly defeating the Duchy of Austria in the Battle of Sempach.
- 1401 – Timur attacks the Jalairid Sultanate and destroys Baghdad.
- 1540 – King Henry VIII of England annuls his marriage to his fourth wife, Anne of Cleves.
- 1572 – Nineteen Catholics suffer martyrdom for their beliefs, in the Dutch town of Gorkum.

=== 1601–1900 ===
- 1609 – Bohemia is granted freedom of religion through the Letter of Majesty by the Holy Roman Emperor, Rudolf II.
- 1701 – A Bourbon force under Nicolas Catinat withdraws from a smaller Habsburg force under Prince Eugene of Savoy in the Battle of Carpi.
- 1735 – Safavid Iran captures Ganja from the Ottoman Empire after defeating them in the battle of Yeghevārd.
- 1745 – French victory in the Battle of Melle allows them to capture Ghent in the days after.
- 1755 – The Braddock Expedition is soundly defeated by a smaller French and Native American force in its attempt to capture Fort Duquesne in what is now downtown Pittsburgh.
- 1762 – Catherine the Great becomes Empress of Russia following the coup against her husband, Peter III.
- 1763 – The Mozart family grand tour of Europe begins, lifting the profile of son Wolfgang Amadeus.
- 1776 – George Washington orders the Declaration of Independence to be read out to members of the Continental Army in Manhattan, while thousands of British troops on Staten Island prepare for the Battle of Long Island.
- 1789 – In Versailles, the National Assembly reconstitutes itself as the National Constituent Assembly and begins preparations for a French constitution.
- 1790 – The Swedish Navy captures one third of the Russian Baltic fleet.
- 1793 – The Act Against Slavery in Upper Canada bans the importation of slaves and will free those who are born into slavery after the passage of the Act at 25 years of age.
- 1795 – Financier James Swan pays off the $2,024,899 US national debt that had been accrued during the American Revolution.
- 1807 – The second Treaty of Tilsit is signed between France and Prussia, ending the War of the Fourth Coalition.
- 1810 – Napoleon annexes the Kingdom of Holland as part of the First French Empire.
- 1811 – Explorer David Thompson posts a sign near what is now Sacajawea State Park in Washington state, claiming the Columbia District for the United Kingdom.
- 1815 – Charles Maurice de Talleyrand-Périgord becomes the first Prime Minister of France.
- 1816 – Argentina declares independence from Spain.
- 1821 – Four hundred and seventy prominent Cypriots including Archbishop Kyprianos are executed in response to Cypriot aid to the Greek War of Independence.
- 1850 – U.S. President Zachary Taylor dies after eating raw fruit and iced milk; he is succeeded in office by Vice President Millard Fillmore.
- 1850 – Persian prophet Báb is executed in Tabriz, Persia.
- 1863 – American Civil War: The Siege of Port Hudson ends in a Union victory and, along with the fall of Vicksburg five days earlier, gives the Union complete control of the Mississippi River.
- 1868 – The 14th Amendment to the United States Constitution is ratified, guaranteeing African Americans full citizenship and all persons in the United States due process of law.
- 1875 – The Herzegovina Uprising against Ottoman rule begins, which would last until 1878 and have far-reaching implications throughout the Balkans.
- 1877 – The inaugural Wimbledon Championships begins.
- 1893 – Daniel Hale Williams, American heart surgeon, performs the first successful open-heart surgery in United States without anesthesia.
- 1896 – William Jennings Bryan delivers his Cross of Gold speech advocating bimetallism at the 1896 Democratic National Convention in Chicago.
- 1900 – The Federation of Australia is given royal assent.
- 1900 – The Governor of Shanxi province in North China orders the execution of 45 foreign Christian missionaries and local church members, including children.

=== 1901–present ===
- 1918 – In Nashville, Tennessee, an inbound local train collides with an outbound express, killing 101 and injuring 171 people, making it the deadliest rail accident in United States history.
- 1922 – Johnny Weissmuller swims the 100 meters freestyle in 58.6 seconds, breaking the world swimming record and the 'minute barrier'.
- 1926 – Chiang Kai-shek accepts the post of commander-in-chief of the National Revolutionary Army, marking the beginning of the Northern Expedition to unite China under the rule of the Nationalist government.
- 1932 – The state of São Paulo revolts against the Brazilian Federal Government, starting the Constitutionalist Revolution.
- 1937 – The silent film archives of Fox Film Corporation are destroyed by the 1937 Fox vault fire.
- 1943 – World War II: The Allied invasion of Sicily begins, leading to the downfall of Mussolini and forcing Hitler to break off the Battle of Kursk.
- 1944 – World War II: American forces take Saipan, bringing the Japanese archipelago within range of B-29 raids, and causing the downfall of the Tojo government.
- 1944 – World War II: Continuation War: Finland wins the Battle of Tali–Ihantala, the largest battle ever fought in northern Europe. The Red Army withdraws its troops from Ihantala and digs into a defensive position, thus ending the Vyborg–Petrozavodsk Offensive.
- 1955 – The Russell–Einstein Manifesto calls for a reduction of the risk of nuclear warfare.
- 1956 – The 7.7 M_{w} Amorgos earthquake shakes the Cyclades island group in the Aegean Sea with a maximum Mercalli intensity of IX (Violent). The shaking and the destructive tsunami that followed left fifty-three people dead. A damaging M7.2 aftershock occurred minutes after the mainshock.
- 1958 – A 7.8 M_{w} strike-slip earthquake in Alaska causes a landslide that produces a megatsunami. The runup from the waves reached 525 m (1,722 ft) on the rim of Lituya Bay; five people were killed.
- 1961 – Greece becomes the first member state to join the European Economic Community by signing the Athens Agreement, which is later suspended in 1967 during the Greek junta.
- 1962 – Starfish Prime tests the effects of a nuclear explosion at orbital altitudes.
- 1977 – The Pinochet dictatorship in Chile organises the youth event of Acto de Chacarillas, a ritualised act reminiscent of Francoist Spain.
- 1979 – A car bomb destroys a Renault motor car owned by "Nazi hunters" Serge and Beate Klarsfeld outside their home in France in an unsuccessful assassination attempt.
- 1982 – Pan Am Flight 759 crashes in Kenner, Louisiana, killing all 145 people on board and eight others on the ground.
- 1986 – The New Zealand Parliament passes the Homosexual Law Reform Act legalising homosexuality in New Zealand.
- 1993 – The Parliament of Canada passes the Nunavut Act leading to the 1999 creation of Nunavut, dividing the Northwest Territories into arctic (Inuit) and sub-arctic (Dene) lands based on a plebiscite.
- 1995 – The Navaly church bombing is carried out by the Sri Lanka Air Force killing 125 Tamil civilian refugees.
- 1997 – An explosion aboard a Brazilian airline TAM Fokker 100 launches engineer Fernando Caldeira de Moura Campos into a 2,400 meters free fall.
- 1999 – Days of student protests begin after Iranian police and hardliners attack a student dormitory at the University of Tehran.
- 2002 – The African Union is established in Addis Ababa, Ethiopia, replacing the Organisation of African Unity (OAU). The organization's first chairman is Thabo Mbeki, President of South Africa.
- 2004 – The Senate Report on Iraqi WMD Intelligence is released by the United States Senate Select Committee on Intelligence, casting doubt on the rationale for the Iraq War.
- 2006 – One hundred and twenty-five people are killed when S7 Airlines Flight 778, an Airbus A310 passenger jet, veers off the runway while landing in wet conditions at Irkutsk Airport in Siberia.
- 2006 – Italy win their fourth World Cup title, defeating France 5–3 on penalties following a 1–1 draw after extra time.
- 2011 – South Sudan gains independence and secedes from Sudan.
- 2011 – A rally takes place in Kuala Lumpur, Malaysia to call for fairer elections in the country.
- 2025 – Earth completes its shortest recorded day due to a slight acceleration in rotation, with July 9 lasting approximately 1.3 to 1.6 milliseconds less than 24 hours.

== Births ==
=== Pre-1600 ===
- 1249 – Emperor Kameyama of Japan (died 1305)
- 1455 – Frederick IV of Baden, Dutch bishop (died 1517)
- 1511 – Dorothea of Saxe-Lauenburg, queen consort of Denmark and Norway (died 1571)
- 1526 – Elizabeth of Austria, Polish noble (died 1545)
- 1577 – Thomas West, 3rd Baron De La Warr, English-American soldier and politician, Colonial Governor of Virginia (died 1618)
- 1578 – Ferdinand II, Holy Roman Emperor (died 1637)

=== 1601–1900 ===
- 1654 – Emperor Reigen of Japan (died 1732)
- 1686 – Philip Livingston, American merchant and politician (died 1749)
- 1689 – Alexis Piron, French epigrammatist and playwright (died 1773)
- 1721 – Johann Nikolaus Götz, German poet and author (died 1781)
- 1753 – William Waldegrave, 1st Baron Radstock, English admiral and politician, 34th Lieutenant Governor of Newfoundland (died 1825)
- 1764 – Ann Ward, English author and poet (died 1823)
- 1766 – Jacob Perkins, American inventor (died 1849)
- 1775 – Matthew Lewis, English author and playwright (died 1818)
- 1777 – Paavo Ruotsalainen, Finnish farmer and lay preacher (died 1852)
- 1808 – Alexander William Doniphan, American lawyer and colonel (died 1887)
- 1809 – Friedrich Gustav Jakob Henle, German physician, pathologist, and anatomist (died 1885)
- 1819 – Elias Howe, American inventor, invented the sewing machine (died 1867)
- 1825 – A. C. Gibbs, American lawyer and politician, 2nd Governor of Oregon (died 1886)
- 1828 – Luigi Oreglia di Santo Stefano, Italian cardinal (died 1913)
- 1834 – Jan Neruda, Czech journalist and poet (died 1891)
- 1836 – Camille of Renesse-Breidbach (died 1904)
- 1848 – Robert I, Duke of Parma (died 1907)
- 1850 – George F. Durand, Canadian architect (died 1889)
- 1853 – William Turner Dannat, American painter (died 1929)
- 1856 – John Verran, English-Australian politician, 26th Premier of South Australia (died 1932)
- 1858 – Franz Boas, German-American anthropologist and linguist (died 1942)
- 1867 – Georges Lecomte, French author and playwright (died 1958)
- 1879 – Carlos Chagas, Brazilian physician and parasitologist (died 1934)
- 1879 – Ottorino Respighi, Italian composer and conductor (died 1936)
- 1887 – James Ormsbee Chapin, American-Canadian painter and illustrator (died 1975)
- 1887 – Saturnino Herrán, Mexican painter (died 1918)
- 1887 – Samuel Eliot Morison, American admiral and historian (died 1976)
- 1889 – Léo Dandurand, American-Canadian ice hockey player, coach, and referee (died 1964)
- 1893 – George Geary, English cricketer and coach (died 1981)
- 1894 – Pyotr Kapitsa, Russian physicist, Nobel Prize laureate (died 1984)

=== 1901–present ===
- 1901 – Barbara Cartland, English author (died 2000)
- 1902 – Peter Acland, English soldier (died 1993)
- 1905 – Clarence Campbell, Canadian ice hockey player and referee (died 1984)
- 1907 – Eddie Dean, American singer-songwriter (died 1999)
- 1908 – Allamah Rasheed Turabi, Pakistani philosopher and scholar (died 1973)
- 1908 – Minor White, American photographer, critic, and educator (died 1976)
- 1909 – Basil Wolverton, American author and illustrator (died 1978)
- 1910 – Govan Mbeki, South African anti-apartheid and ANC leader and activist (died 2001)
- 1911 – Mervyn Peake, English author and illustrator (died 1968)
- 1911 – John Archibald Wheeler, American physicist and author (died 2008)
- 1914 – Willi Stoph, German engineer and politician, 4th Prime Minister of East Germany (died 1999)
- 1914 – Mac Wilson, Australian rules footballer (died 2017)
- 1915 – David Diamond, American composer and educator (died 2005)
- 1915 – Lee Embree, American sergeant and photographer (died 2008)
- 1916 – Dean Goffin, New Zealand composer (died 1984)
- 1916 – Edward Heath, English colonel and politician; Prime Minister of the United Kingdom, 1970-74 (died 2005)
- 1917 – Krystyna Dańko, Polish orphan, survivor of Holocaust (died 2019)
- 1918 – Nicolaas Govert de Bruijn, Dutch mathematician and academic (died 2012)
- 1918 – Jarl Wahlström, Finnish 12th General of The Salvation Army (died 1999)
- 1921 – David C. Jones, American general (died 2013)
- 1922 – Kathleen Booth, British computer scientist and mathematician (died 2022)
- 1922 – Angelines Fernández, Spanish-Mexican actress (died 1994)
- 1922 – Jim Pollard, American basketball player and coach (died 1993)
- 1924 – Pierre Cochereau, French organist and composer (died 1984)
- 1925 – Guru Dutt, Indian actor, director, and producer (died 1964)
- 1925 – Charles E. Wicks, American engineer, author, and academic (died 2010)
- 1925 – Ronald I. Spiers, American ambassador (died 2021)
- 1926 – Murphy Anderson, American illustrator (died 2015)
- 1926 – Ben Roy Mottelson, American-Danish physicist and academic, Nobel Prize laureate (died 2022)
- 1926 – Pedro Dellacha, Argentine football defender and coach (died 2010)
- 1926 – Mathilde Krim, Italian-American medical researcher and health educator (died 2018)
- 1927 – Ed Ames, American singer and actor (died 2023)
- 1927 – Red Kelly, Canadian ice hockey player, coach, and politician (died 2019)
- 1928 – Federico Bahamontes, Spanish cyclist (died 2023)
- 1928 – Vince Edwards, American actor, singer, and director (died 1996)
- 1929 – Lee Hazlewood, American singer-songwriter and producer (died 2007)
- 1929 – Patricia Kenner, American politician and registered nurse (died 2013)
- 1929 – Jesse McReynolds, American singer and mandolin player (died 2023)
- 1929 – Chi Haotian, Chinese general
- 1929 – Hassan II of Morocco (died 1999)
- 1930 – K. Balachander, Indian actor, director, producer, and screenwriter (died 2014)
- 1930 – Buddy Bregman, American composer and conductor (died 2017)
- 1930 – Janice Lourie, American computer scientist and graphic artist
- 1930 – Elsa Lystad, Norwegian actress (died 2023)
- 1930 – Patricia Newcomb, American publicist
- 1930 – Roy McLean, South African cricketer and rugby player (died 2007)
- 1931 – Haynes Johnson, American journalist and author (died 2013)
- 1931 – Sylvia Bacon, American judge (died 2023)
- 1932 – Donald Rumsfeld, American captain and politician, 13th United States Secretary of Defense (died 2021)
- 1932 – Amitzur Shapira, Israeli sprinter and long jumper (died 1972)
- 1933 – Oliver Sacks, English-American neurologist, author, and academic (died 2015)
- 1934 – Michael Graves, American architect, designed the Portland Building and the Humana Building (died 2015)
- 1935 – Wim Duisenberg, Dutch economist and politician, Dutch Minister of Finance (died 2005)
- 1935 – Mercedes Sosa, Argentine singer and activist (died 2009)
- 1935 – Mighty Sparrow, Grenadian calypso musician (died 2026)
- 1935 – Michael Williams, English actor (died 2001)
- 1936 – June Jordan, American poet and educator (died 2002)
- 1936 – David Zinman, American violinist and conductor
- 1937 – David Hockney, English painter and photographer (died 2026)
- 1938 – Brian Dennehy, American actor (died 2020)
- 1938 – Sanjeev Kumar, Indian film actor (died 1985)
- 1940 – David B. Frohnmayer, American lawyer and politician, 12th Oregon Attorney General (died 2015)
- 1940 – Eugene Victor Wolfenstein, American psychoanalyst and theorist (died 2010)
- 1941 – Mac MacLeod, English musician (died 2020)
- 1942 – David Chidgey, Baron Chidgey, English engineer and politician (died 2022)
- 1942 – Richard Roundtree, American actor (died 2023)
- 1943 – John Casper, American colonel, pilot, and astronaut
- 1944 – Judith M. Brown, Indian-English historian and academic
- 1944 – John Cunniff, American ice hockey player and coach (died 2002)
- 1944 – Tabassum, Indian actress and talk show host (died 2022)
- 1945 – Dean Koontz, American author and screenwriter
- 1945 – Root Boy Slim, American singer-songwriter and guitarist (died 1993)
- 1946 – Bon Scott, Scottish-Australian singer-songwriter (died 1980)
- 1947 – Haruomi Hosono, Japanese singer-songwriter, bass player, and producer
- 1947 – Mitch Mitchell, English drummer (died 2008)
- 1947 – O. J. Simpson, American football player and actor (died 2024)
- 1947 – Patrick Wormald, English historian (died 2004)
- 1948 – Hassan Wirajuda, Indonesian lawyer and politician, 15th Indonesian Minister of Foreign Affairs
- 1949 – Raoul Cédras, Haitian military officer and politician
- 1950 – Amal ibn Idris al-Alami, Moroccan physician and neurosurgeon
- 1950 – Adriano Panatta, Italian tennis player and sailor
- 1950 – Viktor Yanukovych, Ukrainian engineer and politician, 4th President of Ukraine
- 1950 – Moisés Canelo, Honduran singer-songwriter (died 2024)
- 1951 – Chris Cooper, American actor
- 1951 – Māris Gailis, Latvian politician, businessman, and former Prime Minister of Latvia
- 1952 – John Tesh, American pianist, composer, and radio and television host
- 1953 – Margie Gillis, Canadian dancer and choreographer
- 1953 – Thomas Ligotti, American author
- 1954 – Théophile Abega, Cameroonian footballer and politician (died 2012)
- 1954 – Kevin O'Leary, Canadian journalist and businessman
- 1955 – Steve Coppell, English footballer and manager
- 1955 – Lindsey Graham, American lawyer and politician (died 2026)
- 1955 – Jimmy Smits, American actor and producer
- 1955 – Willie Wilson, American baseball player and manager
- 1956 – Tom Hanks, American actor, director, producer, and screenwriter
- 1956 – Michael Lederer, American author, poet, and playwright
- 1957 – Marc Almond, English singer-songwriter
- 1957 – Tim Kring, American screenwriter and producer
- 1957 – Kelly McGillis, American actress
- 1957 – Paul Merton, English comedian, actor, and screenwriter
- 1958 – Abdul Latiff Ahmad, Malaysian politician
- 1958 – Jacob Joseph, Malaysian football coach
- 1959 – Jim Kerr, Scottish singer-songwriter and keyboard player
- 1959 – Kevin Nash, American professional wrestler and actor
- 1959 – Clive Stafford Smith, English lawyer and author
- 1960 – Yūko Asano, Japanese actress and singer
- 1960 – Wally Fullerton Smith, Australian rugby league player
- 1960 – Eduardo Montes-Bradley, Argentine journalist, photographer, and author
- 1963 – Klaus Theiss, German footballer
- 1964 – Courtney Love, American singer-songwriter, guitarist, and actress
- 1964 – Gianluca Vialli, Italian footballer and coach (died 2023)
- 1965 – Frank Bello, American bass player
- 1965 – Thomas Jahn, German director and screenwriter
- 1965 – Jason Rhoades, American sculptor (died 2006)
- 1966 – Pamela Adlon, American actress and voice artist
- 1966 – Zheng Cao, Chinese-American soprano and actress (died 2013)
- 1966 – Gary Glasberg, American television writer and producer (died 2016)
- 1966 – Marco Pennette, American screenwriter and producer
- 1967 – Gunnar Axén, Swedish politician
- 1967 – Yordan Letchkov, Bulgarian footballer
- 1967 – Mark Stoops, American football player and coach
- 1967 – Julie Thomas, Welsh lawn bowler
- 1968 – Paolo Di Canio, Italian footballer and manager
- 1969 – Nicklas Barker, Swedish singer-songwriter and guitarist
- 1969 – Jason Kearton, Australian footballer and coach
- 1969 – Agnieszka Kłopotek, Polish politician and zootechnician
- 1970 – Trent Green, American football player and sportscaster
- 1970 – Masami Tsuda, Japanese author and illustrator
- 1971 – Marc Andreessen, American software developer, co-founded Netscape
- 1972 – Ara Babajian, American drummer and songwriter
- 1973 – Kelly Holcomb, American football player and sportscaster
- 1974 – Siân Berry, English environmentalist and politician
- 1974 – Ian Bradshaw, Barbadian cricketer
- 1974 – Gary Kelly, Irish footballer
- 1974 – Kārlis Skrastiņš, Latvian ice hockey player (died 2011)
- 1974 – Nikola Šarčević, Swedish singer-songwriter and bass player
- 1975 – Shelton Benjamin, American wrestler
- 1975 – Isaac Brock, American singer-songwriter and guitarist
- 1975 – Robert Koenig, American director, producer, and screenwriter
- 1975 – Craig Quinnell, Welsh rugby player
- 1975 – Jack White, American singer-songwriter, guitarist, and producer
- 1976 – Thomas Cichon, Polish-German footballer and manager
- 1976 – Fred Savage, American actor, director, and producer
- 1976 – Radike Samo, Fijian-Australian rugby player
- 1977 – Sarah Ashton-Cirillo, American journalist
- 1978 – Kara Goucher, American runner
- 1978 – Nuno Santos, Portuguese footballer
- 1979 – Gary Chaw, Malaysian Chinese singer-songwriter
- 1981 – Lee Chun-soo, South Korean footballer
- 1981 – Junauda Petrus, American author and performance artist
- 1982 – Alecko Eskandarian, American soccer player and manager
- 1982 – Sakon Yamamoto, Japanese race car driver
- 1984 – Chris Campoli, Canadian ice hockey player
- 1984 – Gianni Fabiano, Italian footballer
- 1984 – Jacob Hoggard, Canadian singer-songwriter and guitarist
- 1984 – Ave Pajo, Estonian footballer
- 1984 – Piia Suomalainen, Finnish tennis player
- 1984 – LA Tenorio, Filipino basketball player
- 1985 – Paweł Korzeniowski, Polish swimmer
- 1985 – Ashley Young, English footballer
- 1986 – Sébastien Bassong, Cameroonian footballer
- 1986 – Simon Dumont, American skier
- 1986 – Kiely Williams, American singer-songwriter and dancer
- 1987 – Gert Jõeäär, Estonian cyclist
- 1987 – Rebecca Sugar, American animator, composer, and screenwriter
- 1988 – Raul Rusescu, Romanian footballer
- 1990 – Earl Bamber, New Zealand race car driver
- 1990 – Fábio, Brazilian footballer
- 1990 – Rafael, Brazilian footballer
- 1991 – Mitchel Musso, American actor and singer
- 1993 – Mitch Larkin, Australian swimmer
- 1993 – DeAndre Yedlin, American footballer
- 1999 – Claire Corlett, American voice actress
- 2003 – Conor Bradley, Northern Irish footballer

== Deaths ==
=== Pre-1600 ===
- 230 – Empress Dowager Bian, Cao Cao's wife (born 159)
- 518 – Anastasius I Dicorus, Byzantine emperor (born 430)
- 715 – Naga, Japanese prince (born 637)
- 880 – Ariwara no Narihira, Japanese poet (born 825)
- 981 – Ramiro Garcés, king of Viguera
- 1169 – Guido of Ravenna, Italian cartographer, entomologist and historian
- 1228 – Stephen Langton, English cardinal and theologian (born 1150)
- 1270 – Stephen Báncsa, Hungarian cardinal (born c. 1205)
- 1386 – Leopold III, Duke of Austria (born 1351)
- 1441 – Jan van Eyck, Dutch painter (born 1359)
- 1546 – Robert Maxwell, 5th Lord Maxwell, Scottish statesman (born c. 1493)
- 1553 – Maurice, Elector of Saxony (born 1521)

=== 1601–1900 ===
- 1654 – Ferdinand IV, King of the Romans (born 1633)
- 1706 – Pierre Le Moyne d'Iberville, Canadian captain and explorer (born 1661)
- 1737 – Gian Gastone de' Medici, Grand Duke of Tuscany (born 1671)
- 1742 – John Oldmixon, English historian, poet, and playwright (born 1673)
- 1746 – Philip V of Spain (born 1683)
- 1747 – Giovanni Bononcini, Italian cellist and composer (born 1670)
- 1766 – Jonathan Mayhew, American minister (born 1720)
- 1774 – Anna Morandi Manzolini, Spanish anatomist (born 1714)
- 1795 – Henry Seymour Conway, English general and politician, Secretary of State for the Northern Department (born 1721)
- 1797 – Edmund Burke, Irish-English philosopher, academic, and politician (born 1729)
- 1828 – Cathinka Buchwieser, German operatic singer and actress (born 1789)
- 1850 – Báb, Persian religious leader, founded Bábism (born 1819)
- 1850 – Zachary Taylor, American general and politician, 12th President of the United States (born 1784)
- 1852 – Thomas McKean Thompson McKennan, American lawyer and politician, 2nd United States Secretary of the Interior (born 1794)
- 1856 – Amedeo Avogadro, Italian chemist and academic (born 1776)
- 1856 – James Strang, American religious leader and politician (born 1813)
- 1880 – Paul Broca, French physician and anatomist (born 1824)
- 1882 – Ignacio Carrera Pinto, Chilean captain (born 1848)

=== 1901–present ===
- 1903 – Alphonse François Renard, Belgian geologist and photographer (born 1842)
- 1927 – John Drew, Jr., American actor (born 1853)
- 1932 – King Camp Gillette, American businessman, founded the Gillette Company (born 1855)
- 1935 – Daniel Edward Howard, 16th president of Liberia (born 1861)
- 1937 – Oliver Law, American commander (born 1899)
- 1938 – Benjamin N. Cardozo, American lawyer and jurist (born 1870)
- 1947 – Lucjan Żeligowski, Polish-Lithuanian general and politician (born 1865)
- 1949 – Fritz Hart, English-Australian composer and conductor (born 1874)
- 1951 – Harry Heilmann, American baseball player and sportscaster (born 1894)
- 1955 – Don Beauman, English race car driver (born 1928)
- 1955 – Adolfo de la Huerta, Mexican politician and provisional president, 1920 (born 1881)
- 1959 – Ferenc Talányi, Slovene journalist and painter (born 1883)
- 1961 – Whittaker Chambers, American spy and witness in Hiss case(born 1901)
- 1962 – Georges Bataille, French philosopher, novelist, and poet (born 1897)
- 1967 – Eugen Fischer, German physician and academic (born 1874)
- 1967 – Fatima Jinnah, Pakistani dentist and politician (born 1893)
- 1970 – Sigrid Holmquist, Swedish actress (born 1899)
- 1971 – Karl Ast, Estonian author and politician (born 1886)
- 1972 – Robert Weede, American opera singer (born 1903)
- 1974 – Earl Warren, American jurist and politician, 14th Chief Justice of the United States (born 1891)
- 1977 – Alice Paul, American activist (born 1885)
- 1979 – Cornelia Otis Skinner, American actress and author (born 1899)
- 1980 – Vinicius de Moraes, Brazilian poet, playwright, and composer (born 1913)
- 1984 – Edna Ernestine Kramer, American mathematician (born 1902)
- 1985 – Charlotte, Grand Duchess of Luxembourg (born 1896)
- 1985 – Jimmy Kinnon, Scottish-American activist, founded Narcotics Anonymous (born 1911)
- 1986 – Patriarch Nicholas VI of Alexandria (born 1915)
- 1992 – Kelvin Coe, Australian ballet dancer (born 1946)
- 1992 – Eric Sevareid, American journalist (born 1912)
- 1993 – Metin Altıok, Turkish poet and educator (born 1940)
- 1994 – Bill Mosienko, Canadian ice hockey player (born 1921)
- 1996 – Melvin Belli, American lawyer (born 1907)
- 1999 – Robert de Cotret, Canadian politician, 56th Secretary of State for Canada (born 1944)
- 2000 – Doug Fisher, English actor (born 1941)
- 2002 – Mayo Kaan, American bodybuilder (born 1914)
- 2002 – Rod Steiger, American actor (born 1925)
- 2004 – Paul Klebnikov, American journalist and historian (born 1963)
- 2004 – Isabel Sanford, American actress (born 1917)
- 2005 – Chuck Cadman, Canadian engineer and politician (born 1948)
- 2005 – Yevgeny Grishin, Russian speed skater (born 1931)
- 2005 – Alex Shibicky, Canadian ice hockey player (born 1914)
- 2006 – Milan Williams, American keyboard player and producer (born 1948)
- 2007 – Charles Lane, American actor (born 1905)
- 2008 – Séamus Brennan, Irish accountant and politician, Minister for Transport, Tourism and Sport (born 1948)
- 2010 – Jessica Anderson, Australian author and playwright (born 1916)
- 2011 – Don Ackerman, American basketball player (born 1930)
- 2011 – Facundo Cabral, Argentine singer-songwriter (born 1937)
- 2012 – Shin Jae-chul, South Korean-American martial artist (born 1936)
- 2012 – Chick King, American baseball player (born 1930)
- 2012 – Terepai Maoate, Cook Islander physician and politician, 6th Prime Minister of the Cook Islands (born 1934)
- 2012 – Eugênio Sales, Brazilian cardinal (born 1920)
- 2013 – Markus Büchel, Liechtensteiner politician, 9th Prime Minister of Liechtenstein (born 1959)
- 2013 – Andrew Nori, Solomon lawyer and politician (born 1952)
- 2013 – Kiril of Varna, Bulgarian metropolitan (born 1954)
- 2013 – Barbara Robinson, American author and poet (born 1927)
- 2013 – Toshi Seeger, American activist, co-founded the Clearwater Festival (born 1922)
- 2014 – Lorenzo Álvarez Florentín, Paraguayan violinist and composer (born 1926)
- 2014 – David Azrieli, Polish-Canadian businessman and philanthropist (born 1922)
- 2014 – Eileen Ford, American businesswoman, co-founded Ford Models (born 1922)
- 2014 – John Spinks, English guitarist and songwriter (born 1953)
- 2015 – Christian Audigier, French fashion designer (born 1958)
- 2015 – Saud bin Faisal bin Abdulaziz Al Saud, Saudi Arabian economist and politician, Saudi Arabian Minister of Foreign Affairs (born 1940)
- 2019 – William E. Dannemeyer, American politician (born 1929)
- 2019 – Ross Perot, American businessman and politician (born 1930)
- 2019 – Fernando de la Rúa, 43rd President of Argentina (born 1937)
- 2019 – Rip Torn, American actor (born 1931)
- 2019 – Freddie Jones, English actor (born 1927)
- 2022 – John Gwynne, English reporter and commentator (born 1945)
- 2024 – Joe Bonsall, American country/gospel singer (born 1948)
- 2024 – Diana Hill, New Zealand biochemist (born 1943)
- 2024 – Jim Inhofe, American politician (born 1934)
- 2024 – Maxine Singer, American biologist (born 1931)
- 2024 – Jerzy Stuhr, Polish actor (born 1947)
- 2025 – Ian Blair, British police officer (born 1953)
- 2025 – Glen Michael, British television presenter and entertainer (born 1926)

== Holidays and observances ==
- Arbor Day (Cambodia)
- Christian Feast Day:
  - Amandina of Schakkebroek (one of Martyrs of Southern Hunan)
  - Blessed Marija Petković
  - Everilda
  - Blessed Giovanna Scopelli
  - Gregorio Grassi (one of Martyrs of Shanxi)
  - Martyr Saints of China
  - Martyrs of Gorkum
  - Our Lady of Itatí
  - Our Lady of Peace, Octave of the Visitation
  - Our Lady of the Rosary of Chiquinquirá
  - Pauline of the Agonizing Heart of Jesus
  - Stephen Langton, Archbishop of Canterbury (Anglican commemoration)
  - Veronica Giuliani
  - July 9 (Eastern Orthodox liturgics)
- Constitution Day (Australia)
- Constitution Day (Palau)
- Constitutionalist Revolution Day (São Paulo)
- Day of the Employees of the Diplomatic Service (Azerbaijan)
- Independence Day, celebrates the declaration of independence of the United Provinces of South America by the Congress of Tucumán in 1816. (Argentina)
- Independence Day, celebrates the independence of South Sudan from Sudan in 2011.
- Nunavut Day (Nunavut)

== Places ==
- July 9 Avenue (Buenos Aires, Argentina)
- Ninth of July Park (Tucumán, Argentina)
