= Charles Wicks =

Charles Wicks may refer to:

- Charles E. Wicks (1925–2010), American chemical engineer
- Charles W. Wicks (1862–1931), American businessman and politician
- Chuck Wicks (born 1979), American singer-songwriter
