= David B. Samadi =

Iranian-American urologist

- Born: Iran
- Education: Stony Brook University (BS, MD)
- Occupations: Urologist, former Chairman of Urology Dept. at Lenox Hill Hospital, Newsmax medical contributor
- Political party: Republican
- Website: samadimd.com

David B. Samadi is an American urologist, a Newsmax contributor, and the former chairman of Urology and Chief of Robotic Surgery at Lenox Hill Hospital.

== Biography ==
Born and raised in the Persian Jewish community of Iran, at age 15 Samadi and his younger brother left in 1979 after the Iranian Revolution. They continued their education in Belgium and the UK before coming to the United States where Samadi completed high school in Roslyn, New York. He attended Stony Brook University and earned his degree in biochemistry. He earned his M.D. from Stony Brook University School of Medicine in 1994. Then he completed his postgraduate training in urology at Montefiore Medical Center and at Albert Einstein College of Medicine. He completed an oncology fellowship in urology at Memorial Sloan Kettering Cancer Center in 2001 and a robotic radical prostatectomy fellowship at Hôpital Henri-Mondor in Creteil, France, under the mentorship of Professor Claude Abbou in 2002.

== Career ==
He first practiced at Columbia Presbyterian Hospital, then joined the faculty of Mt. Sinai School of Medicine in 2007 where he became the Vice Chair of the Department of Urology, and the Chief of Robotics and Minimally Invasive Surgery. In 2012, he was the highest paid doctor in New York City, earning $7.6 million.

He invented the Samadi Modified Advanced Robotic Treatment for prostate cancer surgeries. The technique was designed to replace open surgery with a minimally invasive alternative using the da Vinci Surgical System.

During his tenure at Lenox Hill Hospital, where he served as Chief of Urology, David B. Samadi became the subject of public and regulatory scrutiny regarding his surgical scheduling and administrative practices. In 2017, an investigative report by The Boston Globe' examined his use of concurrent or overlapping surgeries. This practice, used in some teaching hospitals, involves a senior surgeon supervising procedures in more than one operating room simultaneously. The report alleged that Samadi was frequently absent during portions of certain procedures, with residents performing elements of the surgeries. Representatives for Samadi disputed these claims.

Following the publication of these reports, the United States Attorney's Office for the Southern District of New York initiated an inquiry into billing practices associated with concurrent surgeries at Lenox Hill Hospital. In 2019, Northwell Health, the hospital’s parent organization, entered into a civil settlement with the federal government. Under the terms of the agreement, Northwell Health agreed to pay $12.3 million to resolve allegations that it had improperly billed Medicare and Medicaid for procedures in which required teaching physician presence standards may not have been met. The settlement agreement stated that the payment did not constitute an admission of liability or wrongdoing by either the hospital or Samadi. Following these developments, Samadi resigned from his position at Lenox Hill Hospital and subsequently established a private practice.

In June 2020, he joined conservative news outlet Newsmax as a medical contributor.

He is currently director of men's health at St. Francis Hospital in Flower Hill, New York.
