= M'hammed Guessous School =

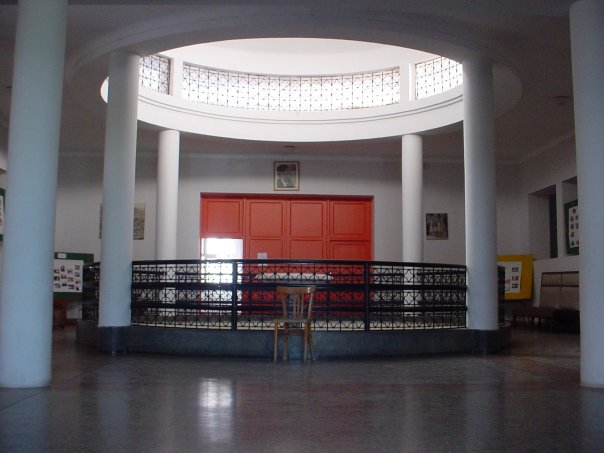
- Administration building hall in the Les Orangers neighborhood; in the background: the portrait of Ahmed Balafrej

Address
- Avenue Abdelouahed Marrakchi; Rabat; Morocco
- Coordinates: 34.0142°N 6.8442°W

Information
- Type: Private Education
- Established: 1934
- Grades: Primary, middle school

The M'hammed Guessous School is located in Rabat, Morocco. It is a private educational institution founded in 1934 by Ahmed Balafrej.

== History ==
Founded in 1934 by the nationalist leader Ahmed Balafrej, the M'hammed Guessous School was considered a model institution by Moroccan nationalists.

Built in the heart of the Les Orangers neighborhood in Rabat on land offered to Ahmed Balafrej by his uncle M'hammed Guessous, the school was named in honor of the latter.

Before the end of the protectorate, the school briefly became a French barracks before being vacated by the military upon the founder's return from exile.

In 1975, the school opened an annex in the Souissi neighborhood.

Since 2004, the M'hammed Guessous School has been classified as a "national heritage site".

== Notable alumni ==
- Ahmed Piro, singer of Gharnati;
- Adil Douiri, former Minister of Tourism;
- Fathallah Oualalou, former Minister of Finance and mayor of Rabat;
- Ahmed Bouchlaken, known as Cheikh el-Arab;
- Youssef Tazi, businessman and deputy;
- Abdelhak El Merini, Director of Royal Protocol and Chancellery;
- Driss Chraibi, Moroccan writer in French;
- Driss Slaoui, former advisor to King Hassan II;
- Idriss Alami, writer and poet in Arabic.

== See also ==
- Ahmed Balafrej
