= Amal ibn Idris al-Alami =

Moroccan physician

Amal El Alami (Arabic: أمل العلمي, romanized: Amal al-ʻIlmī; born 9 July 1950) is a Moroccan physician, neurosurgeon and writer. He was born at Casablanca, the quartier Habous, in a nationalist family linked to the Istiqlal Party.

== Family origins ==
Amal el Alami comes from a famous family of Fez, Al Alami branch Idrisids. He is the son of poet, linguist and nationalist Idriss ibn al-Hassan al-Alami (1925–2007). He is the descendant of the doctor and astronomer Abdeslam ben Mohammed al-Alami (1830–1904).

== Training and career ==
- Bachelor's in experimental sciences (Lycée Moulay Abdallah Casablanca) – June 1969
- Course of study at the Faculty of Medicine and Pharmacy of Rabat Ibn Sina University Hospital (1969–1977)
- Internal CHU Ibn Rushd of Casablanca on competition (24 January 1977): in general surgery and then in pneumology (1977–1979)
- Defense of his doctoral thesis in medicine resulting in his MD degree, 17 March 1979, from the Mohammed V University at Souissi in Rabat where he held the post of assistant in ENT (hospital 20 August)
- Assistant (19 March 1979): in ENT then Neurosurgery (1979–1981)
- Lecturer in Neurosurgery (29 June 1981) (1982–1990)
- Resident alien of the Assistance Publique – Hôpitaux de Paris, in the service of Neurosurgery of Henri Mondor Hospital headed by Professor JP Caron (1982–1983)
- He has taught at various Moroccan university hospital: from Casablanca, from Rabat, and Fes.
- He participated in many conferences and scientific seminars in Morocco and abroad
- Resignation of University Hospital (23 April 1990), and professional practice in private practice in Fes to date.
- He has translated many medical texts of the English in French and in Arabic.

== Certificates and diplomas ==
- University Diploma of Microsurgery
- UD of Biochemistry of normal and pathological nervous system
- CES of Neuroanatomy
- CES of Neurophysiology Clinical Child
- Certificate of Scanner the head
- Certificate of Radiation Protection

== Works ==
- Islam and the medical culture – Modern Printing House Casablanca (in French), second edition 1983.
- The euthanasia (in Arabic) 1999 – Infoprint printing Fez ( ISBN 9954-0-1372-5 )
- Towards an Islamic Medicine (in Arabic) – 1999 – Printing Annajah al Jadida Casablanca (Legal Deposit No. 1999/1441)
- Testimonials of an operated by open heart surgery (in French), 2012 (in press)
- Encyclopedic Dictionary of Neurosurgery (in French)
- The miracle of the brain (of neurobiology to the religion) (in Arabic)
- Abdeslam Al Alami (first doctor Moroccan 1836–1904): his life and works (in Arabic)
- The poet and linguist Idriss Bin Al Hassan Al Alami (1925–2007) (in Arabic)

== Inventions ==
- Framework biopsy spinal in stereotactic condition
- Goniometric frame of traction and reduction in the spine neck
