= Ali Jarbawi =

Palestinian politician and academic

- علي الجرباوي
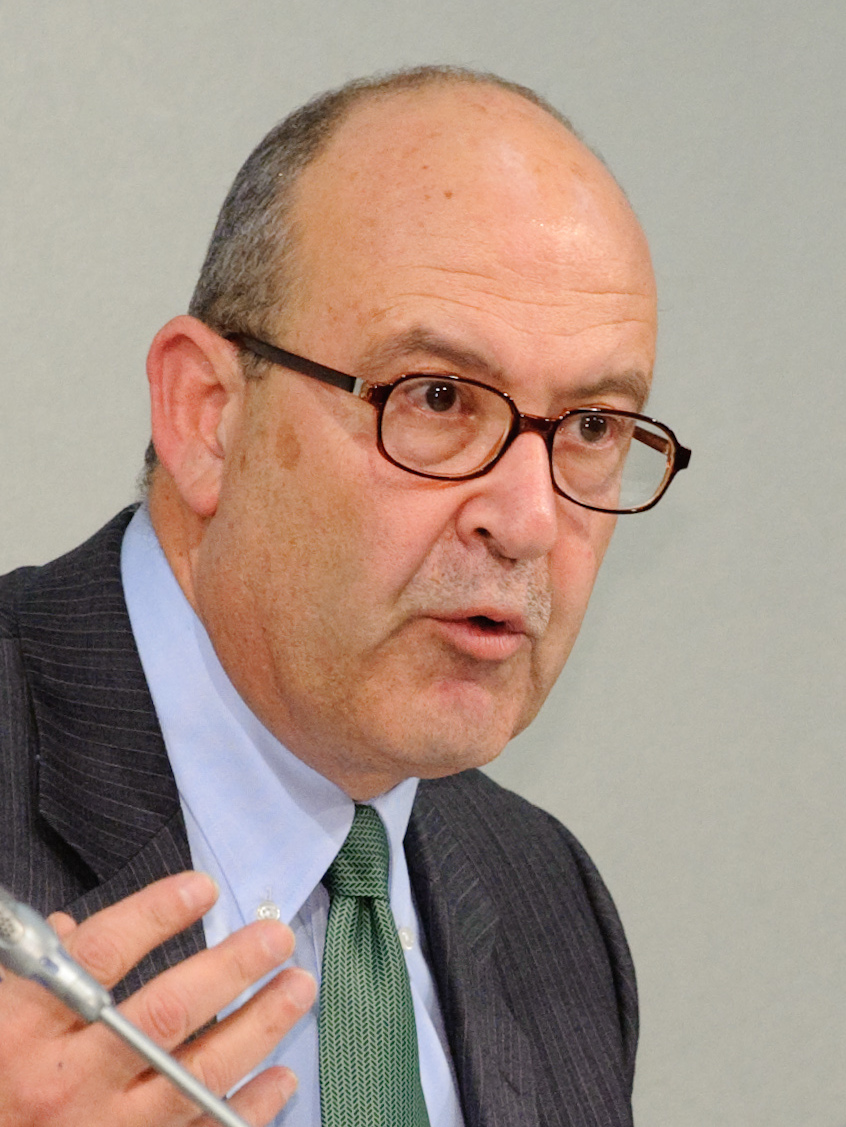
- Jarbawi in 2010

Minister of Higher Education and Scientific Research
- In office 16 May 2012 – 6 June 2013
- President: Mahmoud Abbas
- Prime Minister: Salam Fayyad
- Preceded by: Lamis al-Alami (as Minister of Education and Higher Education)
- Succeeded by: Ali Abu Zuhri (as Minister of Education and Higher Education)

Minister of Planning and Administrative Development
- In office 19 May 2009 – 16 May 2012
- President: Mahmoud Abbas
- Prime Minister: Salam Fayyad
- Preceded by: Samir Abdullah (as Minister of Planning)
- Succeeded by: Mohammad Abu Ramadan (as Minister of State for Planning and Administrative Development)

Personal details
- Born: 30 January 1954 (age 72) Jenin, West Bank, Palestine
- Party: Independent
- Spouse: Tafeeda Jarbawi
- Children: 3
- Education: University of Cincinnati
- Profession: Politician, academic
- Cabinet: Palestinian National Authority 13th Government

Ali Jarbawi (Arabic: علي الجرباوي; born 30 January 1954) is a Palestinian politician and lecturer. He is the former Minister of Planning and Administrative Development and the former Minister of Higher Education of the Government of the Palestinian National Authority.

Prior to this appointment he worked in government as a special adviser to the Prime Minister Salam Fayyad and supervised the preparation of the Palestinian Reform and Development Plan 2008-10 (PRDP). He was General Director of the Palestinian Independent Center for Citizens’ Rights from 1997 to 2000, and worked as Secretary General and Executive Director of the Central Elections’ Commission from 2002 to 2004.

== Academic career ==
Jarbawi joined the faculty of political science at Birzeit University in 1981, after receiving his PhD in political science from the University of Cincinnati, and was awarded professorship in 1996. He has held a variety of senior posts at Birzeit University, including dean of the faculty of law and public administration, dean of students’ affairs, director of the Ibrahim Abu Loghod Institute for International Studies, director of the Center for Researches and Studies, and head of Middle East Department.

Dr. Jarbawi also holds two master's degrees, in public administration and in political science, and a bachelor's degree in sociology.

== Published writings (partial list) ==
- Overcoming the Crisis: Towards a new Palestinian Strategy (Ramallah: Ibrahim Abu-Lughod Institute of International Studies, 2001)
- Toward an Electoral System for the Democratic State of Palestine, co-author, (Ramallah: Muwatin, 2001)
- Teaching Human Rights: A Manual for School Teachers (Jerusalem: UNRWA Publications, 2001)
- The Legal Structure and Democratic Transformation in Palestine (Ramallah: Muwatin, 1999).
- "Building the Institutions of Civil Society in Palestine", in The Palestinian Situation Thirty Years After 1967 (Amman: Abdel-Hamid Shuman Foundation, 1998).
- "Civil Society in Palestine: The Need for a Reassessment", in Civil Society and Democratic Transformation in Palestine (Ramallah: Muwatin, 1995).
- What Type of Local Government Do We Need? The Palestinian Case (Nablus: PCSR, 1996).
- Critical Review of the Palestinian Developmental Experience (Ramallah: Palestinian Studies Project, 1991).
- The Palestinian Universities: A Critical Review (Jerusalem: Arab Studies Society, 1986).

Political offices
Preceded by Samir Abdullah as Minister of Planning	Minister of Planning and Administrative Development; 2009–2012	Succeeded by Mohammad Abu Ramadan as Minister of State for Planning and Administrative Development
Preceded by Lamis al-Alami as Minister of Education and Higher Education	Minister of Higher Education and Scientific Research; 2012–2013	Succeeded by Ali Abu Zuhri as Minister of Education and Higher Education
