= Nasser al-Shaer =

Palestinian politician

- ناصر الدين الشاعر

Deputy Prime Minister of the Palestinian National Authority
- In office 29 March 2006 – 17 March 2007
- Prime Minister: Ismail Haniyeh
- Preceded by: Nabil Shaath
- Succeeded by: Azzam al-Ahmad

Minister of Education and Higher Education
- In office 29 March 2006 – 14 June 2007
- Prime Minister: Ismail Haniyeh
- Preceded by: Naim Abu al-Hummus
- Succeeded by: Lamis al-Alami

Personal details
- Born: Nasser al-Din al-Shaer; 9 December 1961 (age 64) Sebastia, Jordanian-administered West Bank, Palestine (present-day Sebastia, Palestine)
- Party: Hamas
- Education: An-Najah National University (Bachelor's, Master's); University of Manchester (PhD); New York University (Postdoctoral certificate)
- Occupation: Politician, academic

Nasser al-Din al-Shaer (Arabic: ناصر الدين الشاعر; born 9 December 1961) is a Palestinian politician and academic. He served as the Deputy Prime Minister of the Palestinian National Authority and the Minister of Education and Higher Education as a member of Hamas from 2006 to 2007. After the Hamas takeover of the Gaza Strip, all Hamas ministers in the PNA government were dismissed, including al-Shaer.

== Academic background & career ==
Shaer holds a doctorate in comparative religion from England's University of Manchester, where his dissertation was a comparative study on role of women in Islam and Judaism. He later worked as a research scholar on Religion & Democracy at New York University, focusing on US history (1998). In 2001 he was appointed Dean of Islamic Law (Shari'a) at An-Najah National University, Nablus. He has published books and papers on gender, globalization, the peace process, preaching and human rights within religious higher education.

In March 2006 he was appointed Education Minister and Deputy Prime Minister of the Palestinian National Authority.

== Arrests ==
Shaer was first arrested at his home in Ramallah by Israel Defense Forces personnel on 19 August 2006, and was the highest-ranked of about sixty Hamas officials detained by Israel during the 2006 Gaza–Israel conflict. He was released without charges on 27 September after a military court ruled that there was insufficient evidence against him to justify his arrest. Shaer was detained again on 23 May 2007 at his home in Nablus by the IDF during overnight raids in the West Bank relating to the Qassam rocket fire towards Israel from Hamas in the Gaza Strip. He was one of 33 Hamas officials that included a number of mayors and lawmakers to be arrested in a series of raids that day. He was released four months later.

On 19 March 2009, al-Shaer and nine other high-ranking Hamas members in the West Bank were detained by Israeli authorities after prisoner exchange negotiations collapsed between Hamas and Israel. He was arrested in Nablus. According to news correspondents, the detentions appeared to be an Israeli attempt to pressure Hamas after the failure of the negotiations, although an Israeli military official said there was "no indication" the arrests were connected to the issue. Meanwhile, Hamas official Ahmed Bahar denounced the actions as "immoral blackmail by the Zionist occupation."

== Assassination attempt ==
Al-Shaer was subjected to an assassination attempt on 22 July 2022, when gunmen fired from inside a vehicle that stopped in front of Al-Shaer's vehicle, wounding him with about 6 bullets in the legs.

Polling after the event found that a plurality of the population attributed the killing to Fatah or the Palestinian Security Services.

Political offices
Preceded by Nabil Shaath	Deputy Prime Minister of the Palestinian National Authority; 2006–2007	Succeeded by Azzam al-Ahmad
Preceded by Naim Abu al-Hummus	Minister of Education and Higher Education; 2006–2007	Succeeded by Lamis al-Alami
