= José María López Valencia =

Spanish military personnel

- José María López Valencia
- Born: March 25, 1893
- Died: Unknown
- Military career
- Allegiance: Francoist Spain
- Branch: Spain Army
- Service years: 1951–1963
- Rank: Lieutenant general
- Unit: Spanish Army
- Conflicts: Ifni War: Operation Écouvillon
- Awards: Cross of Naval Merit; Cross of Aeronautical Merit; Cross of Military Merit

José María López Valencia (born March 25, 1893) was a Spanish military officer.

== Biography ==
Born on March 25, 1893, he was a professional soldier and belonged to the General Staff Corps.

During the Francoist Spain he held important positions, such as undersecretary of the Ministry of the Army, attorney in the Francoist Cortes and advisor to the National Institute of Industry. He was also commander of the 52nd (1951) and 72nd (1956) divisions. He rose to the rank of lieutenant general. In 1956 he was named captain general of the Canary Islands.

At the beginning of 1958, in the context of the Ifni War, a unified command for the land, sea and air military forces of Ifni and the Spanish Sahara was created, which fell to López Valencia. In this capacity, he took command of the military operations that took place in the Sahara against the Moroccan guerrillas. He went into reserve status in 1963.

He would later form part of the Council of State, between 1959 and 1963.

== Awards ==
- Cross of Naval Merit (1958)
- Cross of Aeronautical Merit (1958)
- Cross of Military Merit (1958)

== Bibliography ==
- Alcaraz Abellán, José (1999). Instituciones y sociedad en Gran Canaria (1936-1960) (in Spanish). Cabildo de Gran Canaria.
- Cardona, Gabriel (2001). Franco y sus generales. La manicura del tigre (in Spanish). Temas de Hoy.
- Platón, Miguel (2001). Hablan los militares. Testimonios para la historia (1939-1996) (in Spanish). Barcelona: Planeta.
