= Ahmed Piro =

Moroccan singer (1932–2024)

- أحمد بيرو
- Born: 1932; Rabat, Morocco
- Died: 15 May 2024 (aged 92); Rabat, Morocco
- Education: M'hammed Guessous School
- Occupation: Singer

Ahmed Piro (Arabic: أحمد بيرو; 1932 – 15 May 2024) was a Moroccan singer of Andalusi classical music.

== Biography ==
Born in Rabat in 1932, Piro's family was of Morisco origin. He studied the Quran during his childhood and attended the M'hammed Guessous School, where he was taught by Othman Jorio. Piro then taught musicians such as Bahaâ Ronda and Mohamed Amine Debbi. In 1992, he was awarded the Wissam Arida, designated for notable cultural personalities in Morocco.

Piro died in Rabat on 15 May 2024, at the age of 92.
