= Mohammed ibn Mohammed Alami =

Moroccan poet

Mohammed ben Mohammed Alami (1932–1993) was a Moroccan poet.

== Bibliography ==
- Alami, Muhammad Ben Muhammad, Dîwân Muh:ammad bin Muh:ammad al-`Alamî Rabat: Mat:ba`a Fîdbrânt, 1999. Abstract: (Poemario de Muhammad Ben Muhammad al-Alami)
- Alami, Muhammad Ben Muhammad, Dîwân Muh:ammad bin Muh:ammad al-`Alamî: Nafh:ât wa ishrâqât Rabat: 2002. Abstract: (Poemario de Muhammad Ben Muhammad Alami, soplidos y erradicaciones).
