= Cheikh el-Arab =

- شيخ العرب
- Photograph of Cheikh El-Arab used in his 1964 wanted poster
- Born: Ahmed Bouchlaken c. 1924; Agouliz, Sous, Morocco
- Died: August 7, 1964 (aged 39–40); Casablanca, Morocco
- Cause of death: Gunshot wound to the rib cage
- Burial place: Sbata Cemetery, Casablanca
- Other names: Ahmed Agouliz, Ahmed Loudiyi

Ahmed ben Mohamed Faouzi (né Bouchlaken; Arabic: أحمد فوزي, Tachelhit: H'mad Fouzi; c. 1924 (Note: Birth years given for Cheikh El Arab are either 1927, or 1929. The Equity and Reconciliation Commission, citing government records, put his birth year in 1924 (died at age 40).) – 7 August 1964), nicknamed Cheikh el-Arab (Arabic: شيخ العرب, lit. 'chief of the Arabs'), was a Moroccan nationalist and veteran of the Moroccan Army of Liberation.

== Early life and education ==
Ahmed ben Mohamed ben Brahim Bouchlaken was born c. 1924 in Agouliz, a village near Irherm in the Sous region of Morocco. An ethnic Berber, he was born in the Shilha Ait Issafen sub-tribe of the Ahl Tata. He was known under the Tachelhit variant of his first name, H'mad. His father, Mohamed ben Brahim, was a fqih who briefly migrated to Tindouf and ran a corner store before returning to his village and marrying his wife, Khadija bent Said. Mohamed later moved to the El Akkari district of Rabat and ran another corner store.

Ahmed attended a madrassa in his youth and received rudimentary education in the Quran and the Arabic language. At age 12, he left for Rabat to join his father, with legend stating that he walked the entire 675 kilometers alongside other youths from the village. He attended another madrassa in Rabat and worked as an assistant in his father's corner store. He worked at the Mohammed V school in Rabat before working as a cook at the M'hammed Guessous school, where he also studied.

== Militant career ==
He went by Ahmed Agouliz to distinguish himself from other resistance fighters named Ahmed, and he bore the name Ahmed ben Mohamed Faouzi or H'mad Fouzi on his identification papers.

According to mortuary records, he died following a gunshot wound to the rib cage. Another member of the group, 37-year-old Ahmed Aznag of Sidi Othmane, died of a gunshot wound to the skull.

== Trial ==
On 14 March 1964, after four months of trial, he was sentenced to death in absentia with Mehdi Ben Barka and other defendants, for conspiracy and attempted assassination against King Hassan II. Mohamed Basri, Moumen Diouri and Omar Benjelloun were sentenced to death. Abderrahmane Youssoufi received a suspended prison sentence. According to Moumen Diouri, also sentenced to death during the trial, this "plot" was invented from scratch by Hassan II's entourage in order to get rid of their most active opponents.

After a lengthy manhunt by police under the command of General Mohamed Oufkir, police officers found and shot him on 7 August 1964 in Casablanca. Diouri claimed that he committed suicide in front of Oufkir rather than surrender.

== Bibliography ==
- Bennouna, Alexander Mehdi (2002). Héros sans gloire. Échec d'une révolution, 1963-1973. Paris. ISBN 2842721632.
