= Aluminium du Maroc =

Moroccan manufacturer

- Type: Public
- Industry: Aluminim manufacturing
- Founded: 1976
- Headquarters: Morocco
- Website: aluminiumdumaroc.com

Aluminium du Maroc is a Moroccan company that manufactures aluminium alloy.

== History ==
Aluminium du Maroc was established in 1976 by the Abdelaziz el-Alami Group in partnership with French aluminium conglomerate Pechiney.

In 1998, Aluminium du Maroc was listed on the Casablanca Stock Exchange. In 2005, it started the expansion of its main Tanger facility to double its production capacity. It acquired Afric Industries in 1993, Industube in 2012, and launched Alucoil Maroc in 2010. From 2017 to 2019, Spain-based Alucoil was a minority shareholder.

In 2016, the company was the victim of a 49 million Moroccan dirhams fraud involving a falsified IBAN.

In 2020, the company experienced governance tensions following internal disagreements over the strategic direction set by Chief Executive Officer Abdelouahed El Alami. These disagreements, led by his brother Mohamed El Alami, ultimately resulted in a leadership transition, with Mohamed El Alami succeeding him in July 2020.

== Description ==
Aluminium du Maroc supplies aluminium alloy to the construction sector, as well as the mechanical, electric, transport, and telecommunication industries. The company operates as a subsidiary of the El Alami Group and is listed on the Casablanca Stock Exchange.
