= William Turner Dannat =

American artist (1853–1929)

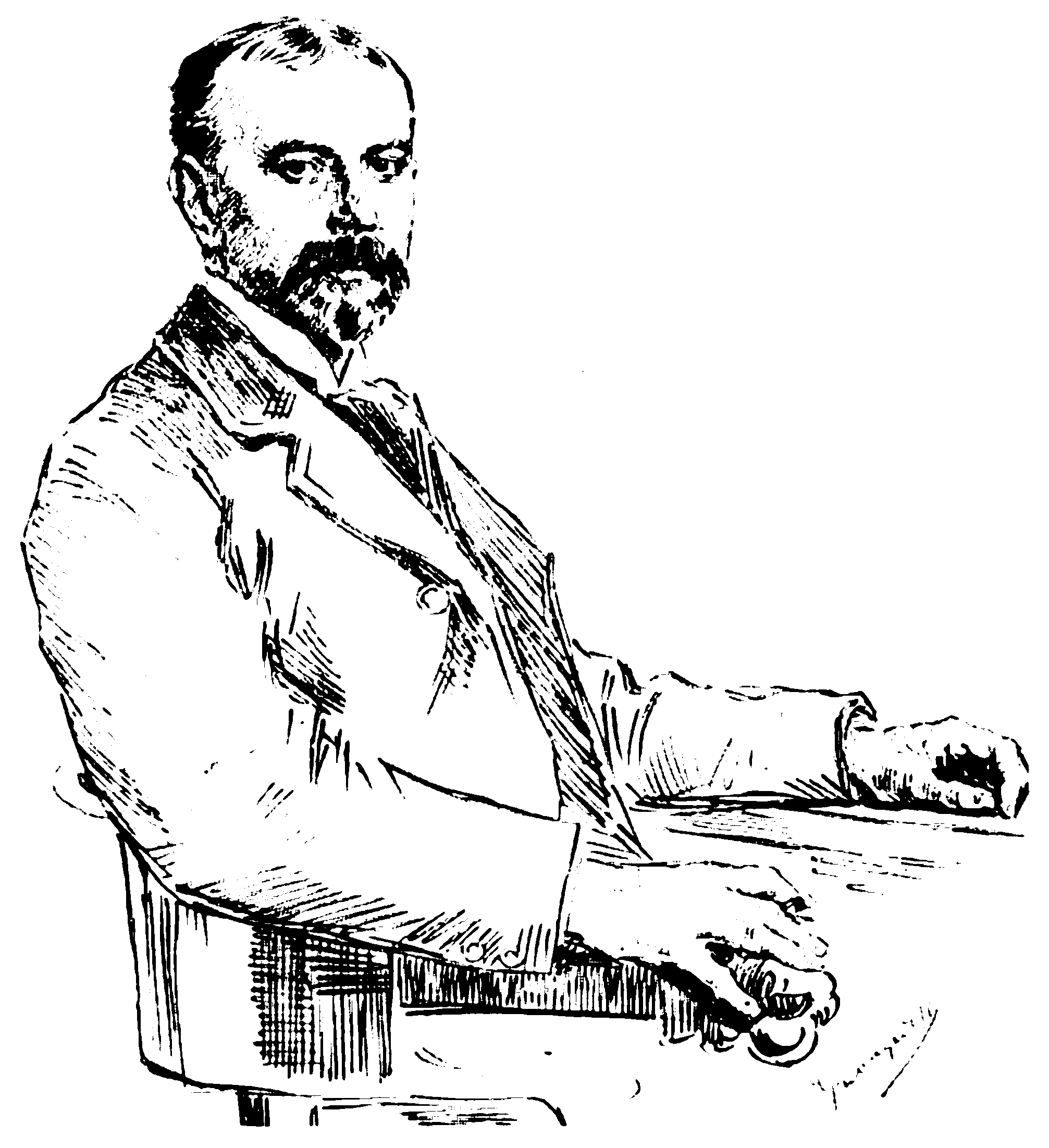
- Born: July 9, 1853; Hempstead, New York, U.S.A.
- Died: March 12, 1929 (aged 75); Monte Carlo, Principality of Monaco
- Occupation: Artist

William Turner Dannat (July 9, 1853 – March 12, 1929) was an American artist known especially for paintings of Spanish subject matter.

== Biography ==
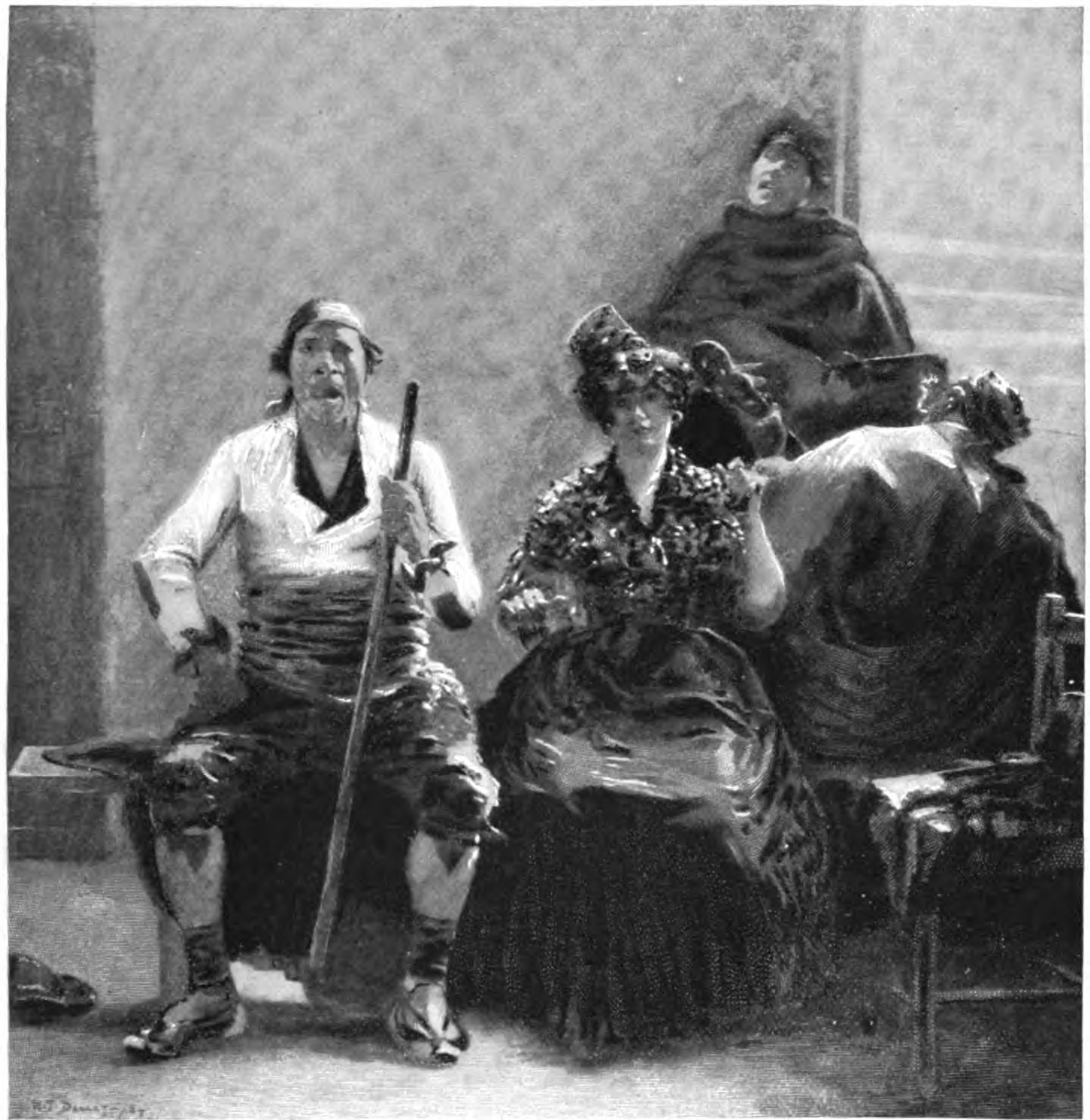
Quatuor Espagnol c. 1884

William T. Dannat was born in 1853 at Hempstead, New York the younger of two boys raised by William H. and Susan (née Jones) Dannat. His father was a successful lumber dealer who, with Charles E. Pell, founded the firm Dannat and Pell. Later, William's older brother David would succeed their father as a partner in the firm.

When Dannat was around the age of twelve, his parents decided to send him to Germany to further his education. He would later study architecture at Hanover and Stuttgart before choosing instead to become an artist. Dannat attended art classes at the Munich Royal Academy of Fine Arts and later under Mihály Munkácsy in Paris. Dannat became an accomplished draughtsman and a distinguished figure and portrait painter. He early attracted attention with sketches and pictures made in Spain. A large composition, The Quatuor Espagnol, that was displayed at the Metropolitan Museum of Art in New York, was one of the successes of the Paris Salon of 1884. Dannat later settled in Paris, where he taught at the Académie Julian. He was influenced by a number of masters, including Carolus Duran and Munkácsy, though more by the latter, as can be observed in his paintings Contrebandier Aragonais and Quatuor Espagnol.

Though at one time his name was mentioned alongside other great American painters such as Sargent and Whistler, Dannat's popularity was more in Europe than his homeland. As he approached middle age, the financially secure artist began to devote more and more of his time to other interests: fencing, boxing and later automobile racing. For nearly twenty years, Dannat ceased painting and when he resumed around 1913, his art had adopted a more surrealistic style with illusionary landscapes and bizarre themes. During his hiatus from painting, Dannat spent much of his time touring Europe studying the techniques of the great masters while remaining active in artistic circles in Paris where he served at one time as the president of the Society of American Painters.

William Turner Dannat died in 1929, aged 75, while at Monte Carlo.

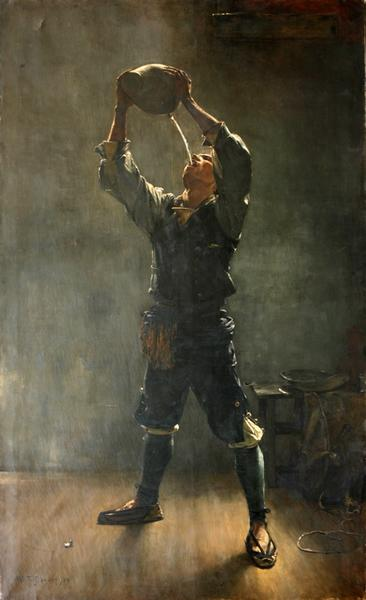
Contrebandier Aragonais c. 1883, musée d'Orsay, Paris.

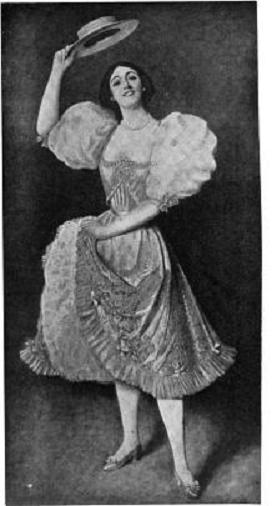
A Dancer c. 1890s

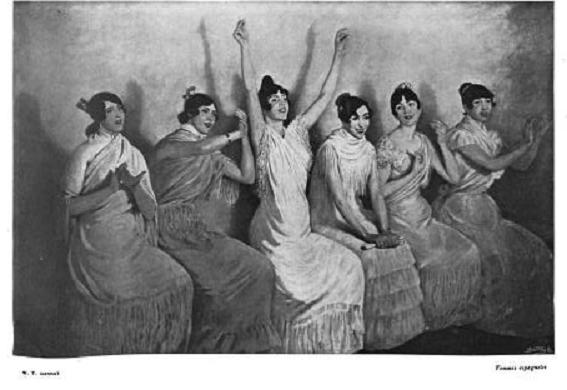
Femmes Espagnoles c. 1892
