= Lamis al-Alami =

Palestinian educator and politician

- لميس العلمي
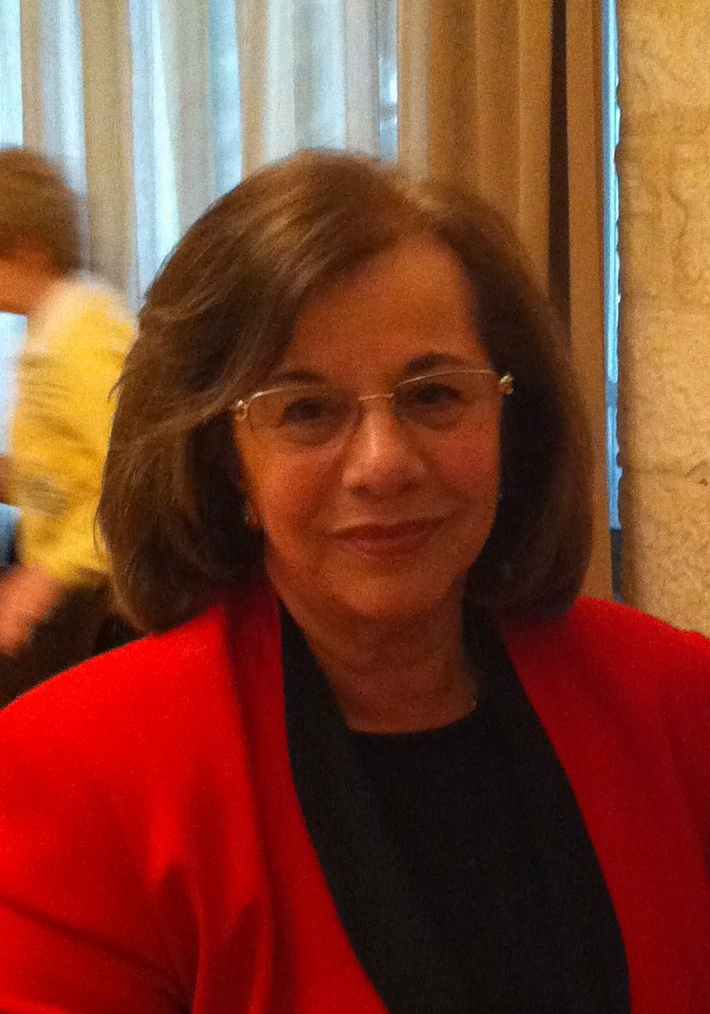
- Al-Alami in 2011

Minister of Education
- In office 16 May 2012 – 6 June 2013
- Prime Minister: Salam Fayyad
- Preceded by: Herself (as Minister of Education and Higher Education)
- Succeeded by: Ali Abu Zuhri (as Minister of Education and Higher Education)

Minister of Education and Higher Education
- In office 14 June 2007 – 16 May 2012
- Prime Minister: Salam Fayyad
- Preceded by: Nasser al-Shaer
- Succeeded by: Herself (as Minister of Education); Ali Jarbawi (as Minister of Higher Education and Scientific Research)

Commissioner of the Central Elections Commission of Palestine

Personal details
- Born: 1943 (age 82–83) Jerusalem, Mandatory Palestine
- Party: Independent
- Education: American University of Beirut (BA, MA); University of Edinburgh (MA)
- Occupation: Politician, educator

Lamis al-Alami (Arabic: لميس العلمي; born 1943) is a Palestinian politician and educator. She was Minister of Education and Higher Education in the Palestinian Authority Governments of June–July 2007 and Palestinian Authority Government of May 2009, and a commissioner of the Central Elections Commission of Palestine.

Al-Alami was born in Jerusalem and educated at the Schmidt's Girls College in the city. She then obtained a BA in English from the American University of Beirut in 1964, a Master's in English literature in 1967, and a Master's in Linguistics at the University of Edinburgh in 1974.

She taught at UNRWA's women's college in Ramallah from 1975, became its deputy director in 1983 and its manager in 1994, in which year she also became responsible for education in all of UNRWA's 100 schools and three colleges. She retired from this in 2004. She was later the Director General of The Independent Commission for Human Rights.

She is a director of the Coalition for Accountability and Integrity (AMAN).

Political offices
Preceded by Nasser al-Shaer	Minister of Education and Higher Education; 2007–2013	Succeeded by Ali Abu Zuhri
