= Charles E. Wicks =

American chemical engineer

- Born: Charles Edward Wicks; July 9, 1925
- Died: July 29, 2010 (aged 85); Corvallis, Oregon
- Education: Willamette University; Oregon State University; Carnegie Mellon University
- Scientific career
- Fields: Chemical Engineering
- Institutions: Oregon State University

Charles Edward Wicks (July 9, 1925 — July 29, 2010) was an American chemical engineer. He was a professor in the Chemical Engineering Department at Oregon State University. His focus was mass transfer, which was the subject of the textbook he coauthored, Fundamentals of Momentum, Heat, and Mass Transfer.

== Early life, education, and career ==
Charles was born on July 9, 1925, in Prineville, Oregon, and was raised in Albany, Oregon. He first studied at Willamette University before leaving for the military service. After returning from service, he completed his undergraduate degree in chemical engineering at Oregon State College in 1950 (now Oregon State University). He continued his studies at Carnegie Institute of Technology (now Carnegie Mellon University) in Pittsburgh, Pennsylvania, receiving his Master of Science in 1952 and PhD in 1954.

He then joined the faculty in the Department of Chemical Engineering at Oregon State University. He spent 34 years as a professor and adviser, the last 17 of which he was the department chair until his retirement in 1987.

He was active in AIChE and Chemical Engineers of Oregon, serving as president from 1973 until 1974. He was elected into the Oregon State Engineering Hall of Fame in 1999.

== Books ==
- Wicks, Charles E.; Block, Frank E. (1963). Thermodynamic Properties of 65 Elements: Their Oxides, Halides, Carbides and Nitrides. U.S. Government Printing Office.
- Welty, James; Wicks, Charles E.; Rorrer, Gregory L.; Wilson, Robert E. (2001). Fundamentals of Momentum, Heat and Mass Transfer (4th ed.). Wiley. ISBN 9780471381495. OCLC 43864401. Wick was also a coauthor on: 1st ed. (1969), OCLC 919596614. 2nd ed. (1976), OCLC 263913436. 3rd ed. (1984), OCLC 300405248, ISBN 9780471874973.

== Death ==
Wicks died on July 29, 2010, of natural causes in Corvallis, Oregon. His life was celebrated at Oregon State University in a standing room only event on September 17, 2010.
