= Hôpital Henri-Mondor =

- Assistance publique - Hôpitaux de Paris
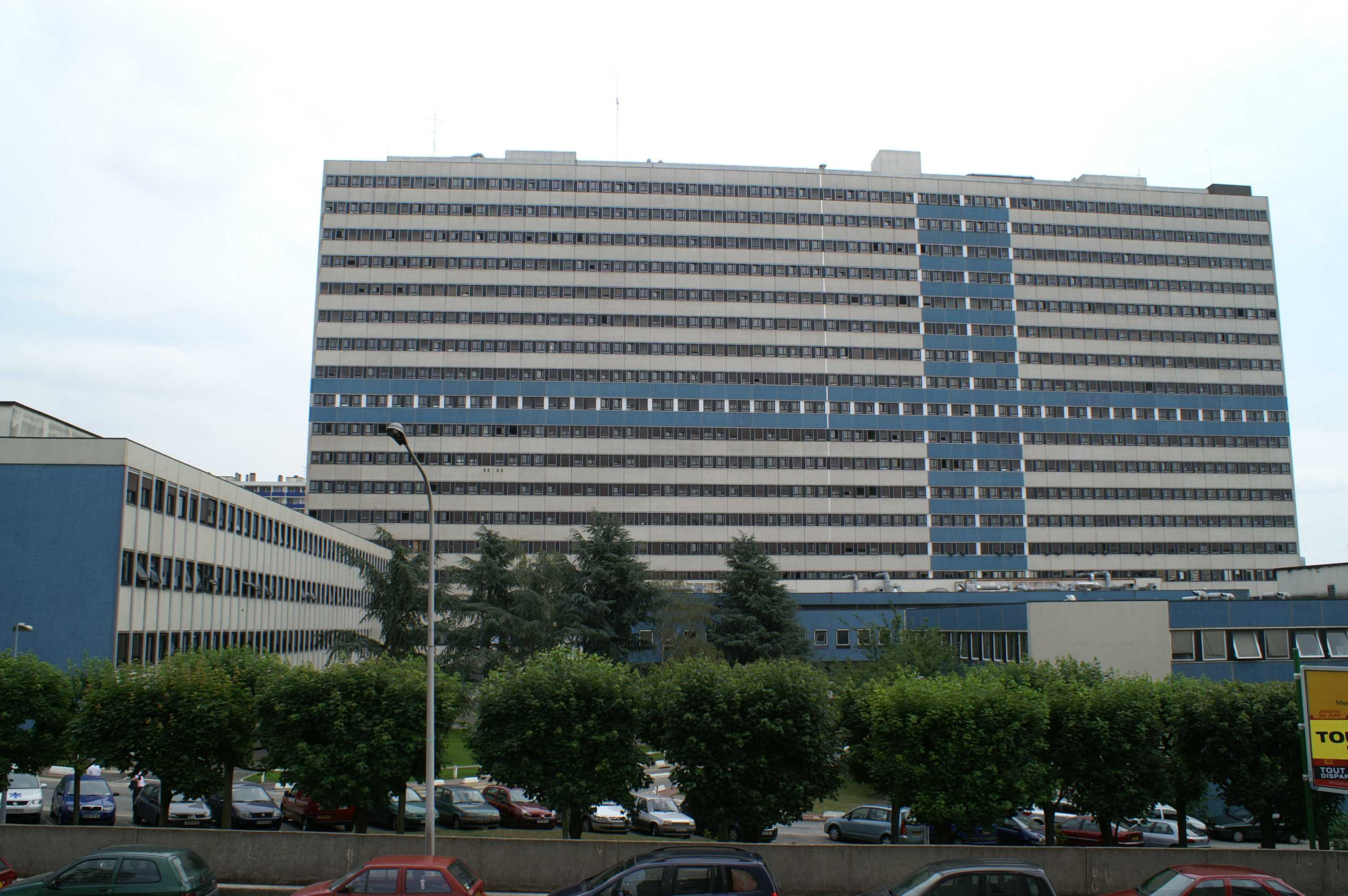
- Entrance of the Hôpital Henri-Mondor

Geography
- Location: Créteil, Val-de-Marne, France
- Coordinates: 48°47′45″N 2°27′08″E

Organisation
- Affiliated university: Paris-East Créteil University

History
- Opened: 1969

Links
- Website: chu-mondor.aphp.fr
- Lists: Hospitals in France

The Hôpital Henri-Mondor is a public hospital (AP-HP) located in Créteil in the Val-de-Marne (Ile-de-France).

Inaugurated on December 2, 1969, the Henri-Mondor University Hospital was designed by architects Jean-Maurice Lafont and Jacques-Henri Riedberger.

In April 2020, when the COVID-19 pandemic was particularly raging in France, and particularly in Ile-de-France, and hospitalization needs were high, a new building, the RBI (Réanimation, blocs, interventionnel) was inaugurated several months ahead of the initial schedule. Built on stilts due to the risk of flooding on the site, it provides an additional usable area of 13,800 m2. The first level, initially unopened, is a block comprising 21 operating rooms, with a recovery room with 41 places. The two upper levels include care rooms, i.e. 85 beds.
