= Idriss ibn al-Hassan al-Alami =

Moroccan poet and translator

Idriss ibn al-Hassan al-Alami (1925–2007) (إدريس بن الحسن العلمي) was a Moroccan poet and translator. He is also the author of several books on the Arab language. Among the books he translated into Arabic are La Peur by Guy de Maupassant and La solidarité par la Science by Eugène Diderot.

== Works ==
Five collections of poetry:

- Sur le chemin de la liberté.
- Avec Dieu ALLAH.
- Avec les fleurs de la vie.
- Le bonheur.
- Sur la voie.

Books on language and translation:

- À propos de l'Arabisation.
- À propos de la langue arabe.
- À propos de la terminologie.
- Comparaison entre la langue arabe et la langue française.

Translations:

- from Arabic into French :
  - ...et j'ai adopté l'Islam - by Emilie Bramlet.
  - le Sex-appel - by Nimat Sidequi
  - Le Prophète de l'Islam à trvers sa tradition: le Livre de la Foi.
- from French into Arabic:
  - l'Islam et la culture médicale - by Amal Alami.
  - La Peur - by Guy de Maupassant.
  - La solidarité par la Science - by Eugène Diderot.

To be published:

- La traversée (autobiography).
- Guide de la poésie arabe.
- La Science de la terminologie.
