= Tafsir Ibn Ajiba =

Sunni Sufi tafsir work by Ahmad ibn 'Ajiba

The Immense Ocean
- Author: Ahmad ibn 'Ajiba
- Original title: Al-Baḥr al-Madīd
- Translators: Translated into English by Mohamed Fouad Aresmouk, and Michael Abdurrahman Fitzgerald
- Language: Arabic, English
- Subject: Tafsir, Sufism
- Publisher: Fons Vitae
- Publication date: 2009
- Publication place: Morocco
- Pages: 204
- ISBN: 9781891785283

The Opening and other Meccan Revelations: Selections from al-Bahr al-Madid of Ahmad ibn 'Ajiba, translated by Abdul Aziz Suraqah.

Al-Bahr al-Madeed fi Tafsir al-Qur'an al-Majeed (Arabic: البحر المديد في تفسير القرآن المجيد, lit. 'The Vast Sea in the Interpretation of the Glorious Qur'an') or shortly named al-Baḥr al-Madīd (English: The Immense Ocean), better known as Tafsir Ibn 'Ajiba (Arabic: تفسير ابن عجيبة), is a Sunni Sufi tafsir work, authored by the Maliki-Ash'ari scholar Ahmad ibn 'Ajiba (d. 1224/1809), who was following the Shadhili-Darqawi order.

It is the only traditional Qur'anic commentary which gives both exoteric exegesis and mystical, spiritual esoteric allusion (ishara) for each verse of the Qur'an, combines traditional exegesis with spiritual contemplation, exploring the outer and inner meanings of the sacred text.

The reader will find commentary, both exoteric and esoteric, on most verses of the Qur'anic text, and will discover the depths at which Qur'anic discourse has been understood by the Sufis over the centuries and up to the author's era.

Ibn Ajiba's tafsir was written in about five years.

== Background ==
Ibn 'Ajiba relied on several earlier sources for his interpretation, as he himself mentioned at the end of his tafsir, including the following:

- Anwar al-Tanzil wa Asrar al-Ta'wil by Nasir al-Din al-Baydawi (d. 685/1286).
- Irshad al-'Aql al-Salim ila Mazaya al-Kitab al-Karim by Ebussuud Efendi (d. 982/1574).
- Hashiya (footnote) on Tafsir al-Jalalayn by Abu Zayd 'Abd al-Rahman al-Fasi (d. 1096/1685).
- Al-Tashil li-'Ulum al-Tanzil by Ibn Juzayy (d. 741/1340).
- Al-Kashf wa al-Bayan by Abu Ishaq al-Tha'labi (d. 427/1035).
- Lata'if al-Isharat by Abu al-Qasim al-Qushayri (d. 465/1074).

As for his Hadith sources, they are the six major Hadith collections (al-Kutub al-Sittah) of Sunni Islam and their valuable commentaries.

His linguistic sources are: Al-Alfiyya, al-Kafiyya al-Shafiyya by Ibn Malik, al-Tasheel by Ibn Hisham; and the books of Qur'an meanings, such as Ma'ani al-Qur'an by al-Farra' and al-Zajjaj; and also the dictionaries/lexicons books, such as al-Sihah by al-Jawhari, and Asas al-Balagha by al-Zamakhshari.

Most of the Sufi sources of his tafsir are from North Africa, al-Andalus, or Egypt. He quotes from scholars such as al-Junayd, al-Qushayri, al-Ghazali, al-Shadhili, al-Mursi, al-Sakandari, al-Darqawi, Muhammad al-Buzidi, al-Jili, al-Shushtari, al-Bistami, Zarruq and Ruzbihan al-Baqli. Ibn 'Ajiba's quotations from Ruzbihan have hitherto gone unnoticed, because Ibn 'Ajiba referred to him as "al-Wartajbi" (Arabic: الورتجبي). (Note: Ruzbihan al-Baqli al-Shirazi (d. 606/1209) is also known as "Al-Wartajbi", but this name is unknown and unpopular, which made Ibn 'Ajiba's quotations from him seem to have been utterly unnoticed.)

== About the author ==
Ahmad ibn 'Ajiba was a Shadhili-Darqawi shaykh who wrote over 30 Islamic Sufi books. He was born in a village near Tetouan to a sharifian family, who originated from an Andalusian mountain village called 'Ayn al-Rumman ("the Spring of Pomegranates"). He showed from an early age an aptitude for the religious sciences and became a traditional 'alim. His orientation changed when he read al-Hikam al-Ata'iyya (the wisdoms or aphorisms of Ibn 'Ata' Allah al-Sakandari) with the commentary by Ibn 'Abbad al-Rundi (d. 792 AH/1390 CE), who contributed to the spread of the Shadhiliyya order in the Maghreb (northwest Africa).

== See also ==
- Tafsir al-Nisaburi
- List of tafsir works
- List of Sunni books
