= Abdalqadir as-Sufi =

Scottish Islamic scholar (1930–2021)

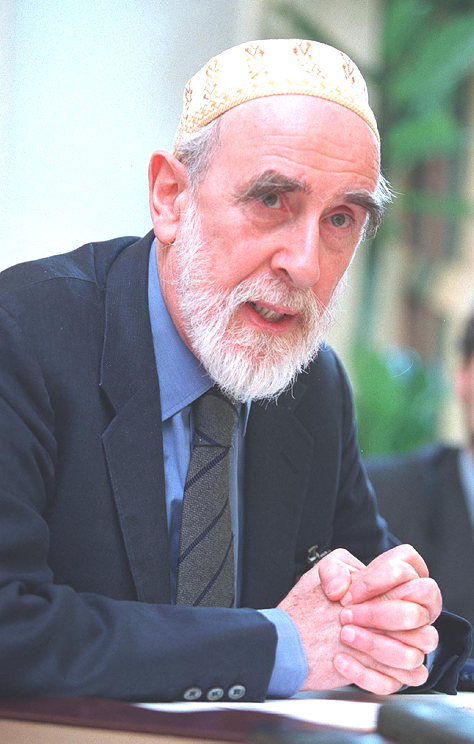
- as-Sufi in 2007
- Title: Shaykh

Personal life
- Born: Ian Stewart Dallas; 1930 Ayr, Scotland
- Died: 1 August 2021 (aged 91) Cape Town, South Africa
- Occupation: Shaykh of Instruction
- Website: shaykhabdalqadir.com

Religious life
- Religion: Islam

Abdalqadir as-Sufi (born Ian Stewart Dallas; 1930 – 1 August 2021) was a Scottish Muslim leader and author. He was Shaykh of Instruction, leader of the Darqawi-Shadhili-Qadiri Tariqa, founder of the Murabitun World Movement and author of numerous books on Islam, Sufism and political theory. Born in Scotland, he was a playwright and actor before he converted to Islam in 1967 with the Imam of the Qarawiyyin Mosque in Fez, Morocco.

== Early life ==
Ian Dallas was born in Scotland in 1930 of a Highland family. He was a descendant of the literary critic and writer E. S. Dallas. He traveled extensively to Greece, France and Italy.

He spent his young adulthood working as a playwright and TV dramatist, having studied at the Royal Academy of Dramatic Art. In 1954, he adapted The Face of Love from Troilus and Cressida, which aired on the BBC; a subsequent theatrical staging was the first major stage role for Albert Finney. He worked at the BBC through the mid-1960s; among his other adaptations were film or theatrical versions of Charlotte Brontë's Jane Eyre, William Makepeace Thackeray's Vanity Fair, Arthur Rimbaud's A Season in Hell, Mikhail Lermontov's A Hero of Our Time, and Eugene O'Neill's Strange Interlude. In 1963, he had a small role in Federico Fellini's film 8½ as "Il partner della telepata".

In the 1960s, Dallas was part of the bohemian "Swinging London" scene, befriending many figures in art, music, and film. He had an affair with the actress Vivien Leigh, seventeen years his senior, and was a close confidant of Edith Piaf. Among his friends was the guitarist Eric Clapton; Dallas gave Clapton a copy of The Story of Layla and Majnun by the 12th-century Persian poet Nizami Ganjavi, which led Clapton to write the song "Layla", performed by his group Derek and the Dominos.

== Conversion ==
As-Sufi converted to Islam in 1967 in Fes, Morocco as Abdalqadir, witnessed by Abdalkarim Daudi, the Imam Khatib of the Qarawiyyin Mosque, and Alal al-Fasi. He then joined the Darqawi order as a student of Muhammad ibn al-Habib. He travelled to Morocco and Algeria with his Shaykh and was further instructed in Sufism by Sidi Hamud ibn al-Bashir of Blida and Sidi Fudul al-Huwari as-Sufi of Fes.

== Teaching ==
Abdalqadir as-Sufi advocated adherence to the Maliki school of Islamic law, which he considered the original legal school of Islam, the tradition of the people of Medina as recorded by Malik ibn Anas, since he considered this the primal formulation of Islamic society and a necessity for the re-establishment of Islam in the current age.

Abdalqadir was responsible for the establishment of the Ihsan Mosque in Norwich, Norfolk, England, and the Jumu'a Mosque of Cape Town.

Abdalqadir as-Sufi taught that suicide terrorism is forbidden under Islamic law, that its psychological pattern stems from nihilism, and that it "draws attention away from the fact that capitalism has failed." He stated that Britain was on "the edge of terminal decline" and that only Britain's Muslim population could "revitalise this ancient realm". He wrote extensively on the importance of monarchy and personal rule. He regarded the face veil (or niqab) of Muslim women as un-Islamic, describing it as an "evil Hinduisation of women".

In 2006, he issued a fatwa, following a visit and speech given by Pope Benedict XVI in Germany. In his Fatwa Concerning the Deliberations of Pope Benedict XVI in Germany, he stated that "in my opinion, Pope Benedict XVI is guilty of insulting the Messenger of Allah". He was an early mentor of American Sufi scholar, Hamza Yusuf.

== Murabitun World Movement ==
In February 2014 he distanced himself from the dinar and dirham movement, saying, "So, I now dis-associate myself from all activity involving the Islamic gold dinar and silver dirham". The other major condition of a correct Zakat, he argued, is the existence of personal rule, or Amirate, since Zakat is, by Qur'anic injunction, accepted rulings and established practice, taken by the leader, not given as a voluntary sadaqa.

== Death ==
As-Sufi died on 1 August 2021 in Cape Town, South Africa at the age of 91.

== Authorship ==
The author of more than 20 books and several essays and articles, As-Sufi's books include:

- The Book of Strangers, (State Univ of New York Press, 1972, ISBN 978-0-88706-990-1)
- The Way of Muhammad, an existential exposition of the pillars of Islam from the perspective of Sufism (Diwan Press, 1975, OCLC 16373203)
- Indications From Signs, (Diwan Press, June 1980, ISBN 978-0-906512-12-8)
- The Hundred Steps (Portobello Press, ISBN 978-1-874216-04-9)
- Qur'anic Tawhid, (Diwan Press, 1981, ISBN 978-0-906512-14-2)
- Letter to An African Muslim, (Diwan Press, 1981, ISBN 0-906512-13-1)
- Kufr – An Islamic Critique, (Diwan Press, 1982, ASIN: B0007C6U32)
- Root Islamic Education, written on the school of the people of Madinah under the leadership of Imam Malik (Madinah Press, June 1993, ISBN 978-1-874216-05-6)
- Oedipus and Dionysus (Freiburg Verlag, 1992, ISBN 1-874216-02-9)
- The Sign of the Sword, an examination on the judgements on jihād in the light of classical works of fiqh, particularly al-Qawanin al-fiqhiyyah of Ibn Juzayy al-Kalbi, relating it to the contemporary situation and the global dominance of world banking and usury finance. (Diwan Press, 1984, ISBN 978-1-871207-26-2)
- The Return of the Khalifate, a historical work on the Ottomans, their demise and its causes and an exposition of a route to the recovery of the khalifate (Madinah Press, 1996, ISBN 978-1-874216-21-6)
- The Technique of the Coup de Banque on the modern age since its inception in the French Revolution. (Kutubia Mayurqa, 2000, ISBN 84-930515-6-X)
- The New Wagnerian (Budgate Press, 2001, ISBN 978-0-620-46755-1)
- Letter to an Arab Muslim (Editorial Kutubia Mayorqa, 2001, ISBN 84-930515-9-4)
- Sultaniyya is a modern statement on leadership in Islam. Abdalqadir surveys Islam under the chapter headings Deen, Dawla (polity), Waqf, Trade, the Sultan – personal rule – and Tasawwuf. (Madinah Press, Cape Town, 2002, OCLC: 50875888)
- Commentary on Surat al-Waqi’a (Madinah Press, 2004, ISBN 0-620-31921-6)
- Collected Works (Budgate Press, 2005, ISBN 978-0-620-34379-4)
- The Book of Tawhid (Madinah Press, 2006, ISBN 0-620-36126-3)
- The Time of the Bedouin (Budgate Press, 2007, ISBN 978-0620465120)
- The Book of Hubb (Madinah Press, 2007, ISBN 978-0-620-39911-1)
- The Book of 'Amal (Madinah Press, 2008, ISBN 978-0-620-40463-1)
- The Book of Safar (Madinah Press, 2009, ISBN 978-0-620-44110-0)
- Political Renewal (The End of the Political Class/The House of Commons and Monarchy) (Budgate Press, 2009, ISBN 978-0-620-44573-3)
- The Muslim Prince (Madinah Press, 2009, ISBN 978-0-620-43455-3)
- The Interim is Mine (Budgate Press, 2010, ISBN 978-0620486187)
- Three Plays (Budgate Press, 2010, ISBN 978-0-620-469463)
- Ten Symphonies of Gorka König (Budgate Press, 2010, ISBN 978-0620465137)
- Discourses (Madinah Press, 2010, ISBN 978-0620469302)
- The Engines of the Broken World (Budgate Press, 2012, ISBN 978-0620532501)
- Commentaries (Madinah Press, 2012, ISBN 978-0620523820)

== Translations undertaken by his students ==
- The Noble Qur'an: a New Rendering of its Meanings in English, by Abdalhaqq and Aisha Bewley (Bookwork, Norwich, UK, ISBN 1-874216-36-3)
- The Muwatta of Imam Malik translated by Aisha Bewley and Ya'qub Johnson (Bookwork, Norwich, UK, 2001, ISBN 0-906512-17-4, ISBN 0-7103-0361-0)
- Ash-Shifa by Qadi Iyad (published as Muhammad – Messenger of Allah) translated by Aisha Bewley (Madinah Press, 1992, ISBN 978-1-874216-00-1)
- The Letters of Shaykh Moulay Muhammad al-Arabi al-Darqawi (published as The Darqawi Way) translated by Aisha Bewley (Diwan Press Norwich, UK, 1980, ISBN 0-906512-06-9).
- The Foundations of Islam by Qadi 'Iyad. (ISBN 979-95486-3-2)
- The Seals of Wisdom by Muhyiddin ibn al-Arabi translated by Aisha Bewley (Madinah Press, Cape Town 2005, ISBN 978-0-9651209-3-7)
- Sufis and Sufism: A Defence by 'Abdu'l-Hayy al-'Amrawi and Abdu'l-Karim Murad translated by Aisha Bewley (Madinah Press, Cape Town 2004, ISBN 0-620-31920-8)
- A Madinan View: on the Sunnah, courtesy, wisdom, battles and history by Ibn Abi Zayd al-Qayrawani translated by Abdassamad Clarke (Ta-Ha Publishers Ltd, London 1999, ISBN 1-897940-84-X)

== Gallery ==
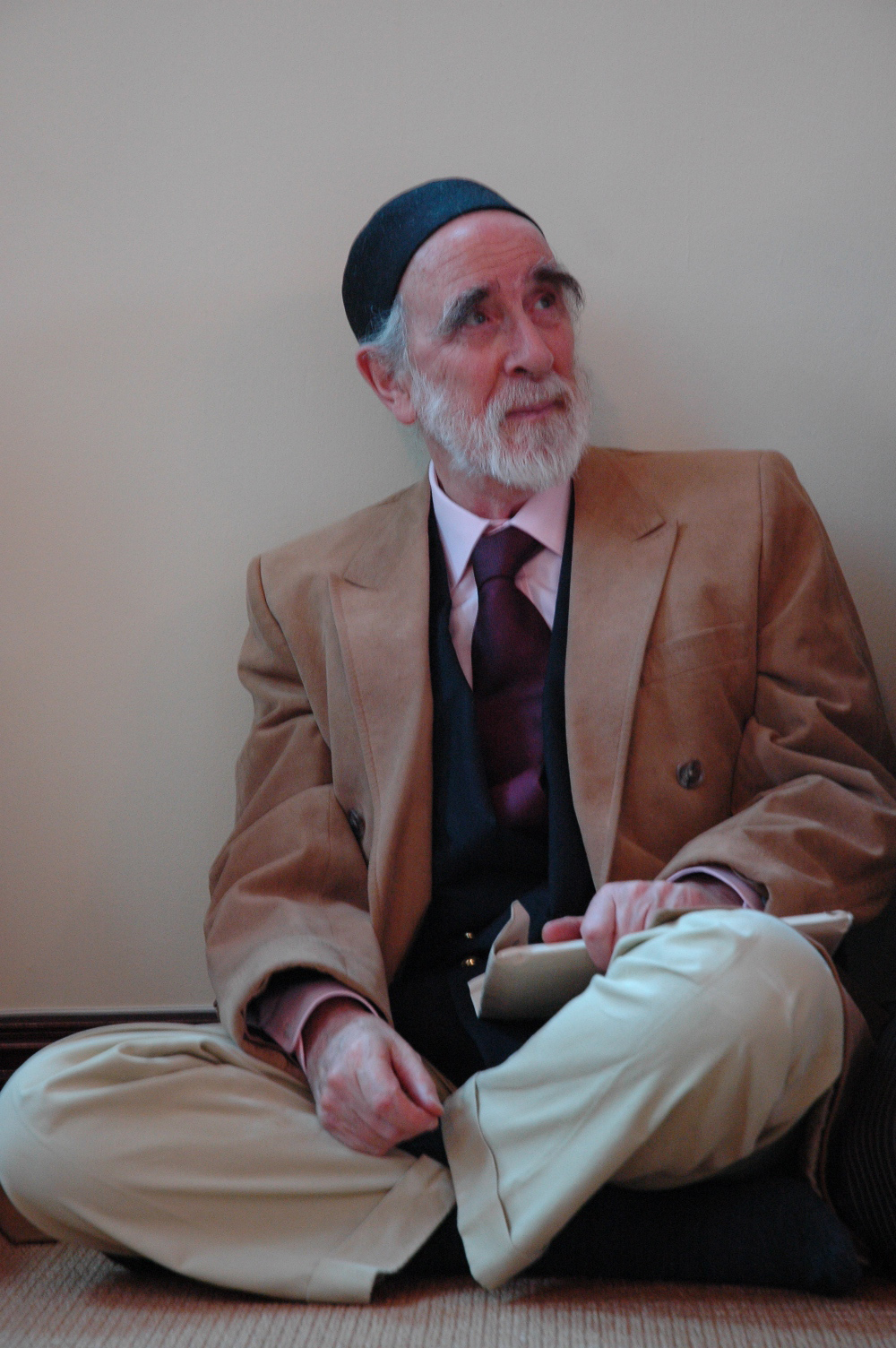

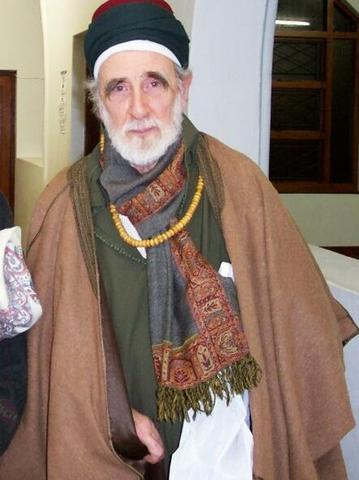

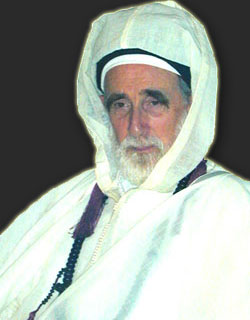
