= Murabitun World Movement =

Islamic movement founded by Abdalqadir as-Sufi

- Founder: Abdalqadir as-Sufi
- Headquarters: South Africa
- Locations: United Kingdom; Spain; South Africa; Mexico

The Murabitun World Movement is an Islamic movement founded by Abdalqadir as-Sufi (born as Ian Dallas), a branch of the Shādhilī–Darqāwī Sufi order with communities in Europe, South America, Southeast Asia, and South Africa, where it is officially based. Its heartland is Spain. The number of its followers may amount, according to one estimate, to around 10,000.

The main objective of the movement is to promote Islam in non-Muslim societies, strengthen its political role, and unite Muslims against perceived threats in contemporary global civilization. While the rhetoric and ideological foundations of Murabitun share similarities with traditionalism, Murabitun emphasize the need for active social and political engagement instead of escapism."

The name of the movement is a reference to the historic Almoravid dynasty (al-Murābiṭūn), whose rise to power began with a revolt, and whose rule was characterized by the renewal of Islam in al-Andalus and West Africa. In general, the term "Murabitun" refers to Muslims who united in frontiers (rubuṭ, plural of ribāṭ) to defend the community from enemy attacks.

== Background ==
The founder of the Murabitun World Movement is Abdalqadir as-Sufi, a convert to Islam born Ian Dallas in Ayr, Scotland, in 1930. He met his first shaykh, Muhammad ibn al-Habib, in Meknes around 1968, and was made a muqaddam and given the title "as-Sufi".

In 1972, returning to England after the shaykh's death, Abdalqadir, together with his friend and associate Abdalhaqq Bewley, established a Darqāwī community in London, where, in a reconstructed Moroccan-style zāwiya, members of the community gathered for prayers and Sufi practices. These gatherings at first had more of a countercultural student community character and even contributed to several music albums stylised as Sufi chants.

In 1976, the community left London and settled in Northern Norfolk, where it bought a large house and a farm. The first ribāṭ (frontier) was established as a compact settlement of British Muslims, consisting of about two hundred families. The commune practiced the study of religion, strove for self-sufficiency, and sought to embody the Islamic way of life.

From 1977 Abdalqadir began to consider himself an independent spiritual guide. The name "Murabitun" became the official name of the movement at this point.

In the mid-1980s Abdalqadir settled in Spain, where, with the support of a group of local converts and after receiving legal recognition from the Ministry of Justice, he founded an association called Sociedad para el Retorno al Islam en España ("Society for the Return of Islam in Spain"). Thus a second ribāṭ was founded in Granada.

A third ribāṭ was established in Johannesburg, after the shaykh moved to South Africa in 2006, founded the JumuꜤa Mosque of Cape Town and got involved in setting up the Dallas College, "a 'post-madrasa' education system capable of equipping Muslims for 'leadership in the modern world'".

A branch (zāwiya) of the Ḥabībīya-Darqāwīyya order was also opened in Berkeley, California. Over time, communities were established in Russia, Mexico, and Indonesia, with a total of about 10,000 followers.

Abdalqadir as-Sufi travelled in Europe and America, held talks, and published works such as The Way of Muhammad and Islam Journal proposing that Islam could be understood, and entered, as the "completion of the Western intellectual and spiritual tradition". He also initiated translations into English of classical texts on Islamic law and Sufism, including the Muwatta Imam Malik.

In 1982 Abdalqadir as-Sufi held a series of talks in America which were to become the basis of his work, Root Islamic Education.

The movement was strongly tied to the charisma of its founder. Towards the end of his life, Abdalqadir became increasingly withdrawn, and the established communities and projects took on a life of their own. The Sufi order (ṭarīqa) was handed over to a young Moroccan shaykh and lost its political orientation.

== Ideas and activities ==
=== Nature of Islam ===
Abdalqadir and his disciples are characterized by a holistic understanding of Islam. Unlike modern Muslim literature, in Murabitun writings, the word "Islam" does not appear as often as the Arabic word Dīn, which translates as "path" or "way". Islam, from Murabitun's point of view, is a complete and perfect system that needs revitalization but not reformation. The particular emphasis of Murabitun's approach is on Sufism as an internal dimension of Islam and an experience of spiritual knowledge.

=== Jurisprudence: strict Malikism ===
Abdalqadir as-Sufi's advocacy of Malik's school of Madinah is explained at length in his work Root Islamic Education. On the one hand, this is due to Abdalqadir's experience in North Africa, where this school traditionally prevails. On the other hand, the shaykh and his followers advocated Malikism as a prototypical über-maḏhab, which Abdalhaqq Bewley called "the closest possible exposition of Islam as it was actually lived by the Prophet and his Companions." Malikism is regarded as the sole tradition with the capacity to preserve the authentic Islamic revelation due to the attention it pays to the tradition of ʿAmal Ahl al-Madinah (Practice of the people of Medina).

Shaykh Abdalqadir's early criticism of both the other three schools of law and some Maliki scholars who allegedly departed from the original purity of the madhhab gives some researchers reason to say that Murabitun created a fifth, "Medinan" madhhab. The Murabitun do not, however, in any way dispute the validity of the other legal schools, nor is adherence to or advocacy of the madhhab of Malik a condition of membership of the Murabitun.

=== Economics: the revival of the Mu'amalat ===
The cornerstone of the movement is the great emphasis on MuꜤāmalāt: the Islamic monetary, commercial, and social system. Murabitun is the only religious group in history with financial theory at the centre of its ideology. Abdalqadir and his followers believe that the modern world is based on an illusion regarding the reality of wealth and a global psychosis around money. "For Abdalqadir, the malaise of the modern secular world is [...] not so much that we do not believe in God. The problem is more fundamentally: that we believe so much in money." Islam is seen by Murabitun as the only force capable of resisting the rapidly expanding "world state."

The movement's ultimate goal is the gradual transformation of the modern capitalist financial system. Criticism has been directed not just at the banking system based on usury, which is forbidden in Islam, but also at the practice of paper money itself, which, unlike gold and silver, valuable in themselves, are essentially receipts of debt and are also rooted in forbidden interests.

==== Position on Zakāt ====
The political and social work of the Murabitun centres around the restoration of the "fallen pillar" of Zakāt, which, it is claimed, has been abandoned on several primary counts.

According to the Murabitun conservative approach:

1. Zakāt in monetary form should be paid exclusively in gold or silver. A fatwa was issued by Umar Vadillo that Zakāt should not be paid in paper money of banknotes, which are essentially receipts of debt, since Zakāt cannot be discharged by passing on a token of debt owed to a third party.
2. It must be disbursed immediately.
3. Zakāt should be collected by the amir (leader of Muslims), which means that the re-establishment of Islamic authority becomes a necessity."

As their authority for this position the Murabitun cite a wide range of sources, beginning with the Qur'anic injunction to take Zakāt ("Take zakat from their wealth" Surat Tawba 9:103), the Prophetic practice of Zakāt-taking, the well-known position of the Caliph Abu Bakr as-Siddiq, and the established practice among the world Muslim community which was until relatively recently the assessment and collection of Zakāt by the Leader and his collectors.

This places them in contradistinction to the currently prevailing practices of voluntary self-assessment, donation to the Zakāt charity of one's choice, and the placement of Zakāt donations into interim or even long-term investment funds. This, they argue, destroys the political cohesion of the Muslim community, which is based primarily on the circulation of wealth along divinely revealed lines. They also condemn Zakāt investment funds as un-Islamic.

==== Position on shari'ah currency ====
Murabitun previously connected their position on Zakāt with promotion of the Islamic gold dinar and silver dirham, which was developed above all by the scholar Umar Ibrahim Vadillo, who has written extensively on the origins of paper money and the Islamic position on money.

As an alternative to paper money, Vadillo justified the need for Islamic countries to switch to a unified bi-metallic currency. The main goal of the project was the accumulation of capital in the Islamic world. The project was supported by former Malaysian Prime Minister Mahathir Mohamad and former Turkish Prime Minister Nezhmetdin Erbakan, as well as King Hassan II of Morocco. In 2006, the minting of the gold dinar was announced in the Malaysian state of Kelantan, the project had enthusiastic supporters among local businesses, but the federal government and the Central Bank of Malaysia hindered its development.

As for the Islamic banking that spread in Muslim world in the 1970s, Murabitun describes it as a facade that masks the global usury system and misleads Muslims. In February 2014, however, shaykh Dr. Abdalqadir as-Sufi distanced himself from the dinar and dirham movement, saying, "So, I now dis-associate myself from all activity involving the Islamic gold dinar and silver dirham".

==== Islamic trading and social welfare ====
The Murabitun advocate a revival of the forms of trading and social welfare practiced during the first generations of Muslims and for most of the history of Islam, proposing that these are the natural modes of human activity and rejecting the dialectical categorisation of "ancient" or "modern", a set of opposites whose application to Islam they consider irrelevant and misleading.

These models have been formulated in detail and include awqaf for the funding of social welfare institutions, mosques and other public facilities.

=== Politics: the return of the Caliphate ===
The Murabitun advocate personal rule as the Islamic and indeed natural form of human governance, taking authority for this position from extensive Qur'anic references.

Abdalqadir's early work Jihad: A Groundplan, despite its strongly Islamist title, rather continues the Western tradition of criticising capitalism and democracy, where "one can trace a remarkably diverse set of philosophical inspirations; from Nietzsche to Jünger [...] to a keen attention to Heidegger's critical theory."

In 1996, Abdalqadir published The Return of the Caliphate, a historical study analyzing the causes of the decline and destruction of the Ottoman Empire. The author primarily attributes these to the adoption of paper money and involvement in interest-based transactions by Ottoman elites.

Two other works by Abdalqadir, Sultaniyya (2002) and The Muslim Prince (2009), offer interpretations of the Islamic state and the rule of the caliph. The Caliphate is contrasted with the modern "fiscal state" and democracy with the personal rule of the monarch-like caliph figure.

Thus, the Murabitun assert the absolute necessity of restoring the Caliphate, claiming that their vision is based on a clear program of economic and political unification of the Ummah, rather than romanticizing the past.

According to Abdalqadir, all other contemporary attempts of Islamic movements to revive the Caliphate are deemed untenable due to methodological errors.

=== Community building ===
In the early days, the Murabitun actively encouraged their members to create self-sufficient communities, subordinate to the amir and based around the concepts of 'Mosque and Market', following the example of the first Muslim community in Medina. A certain separatism from society (homeschooling, minimization of trade and financial contacts) was advocated.

In practice, the strive for self-sufficiency and the attempt to embody the lifestyle of the Medina community in the modern world proved unviable. In reality, most members of the Murabitun were fully or partially dependent on the global capitalist system, had mortgages, and used conventional currency.

Muslims from Mexico during the Hajj in 2002

Nevertheless, the Murabitun have established a number of communities around the world, the most significant of which have included communities in Mexico, Indonesia, and Russia, in addition to the British, Spanish, and South African communities. Many of these now exist as de facto independent projects.

=== Western Sufi ṭarīqa ===
Due to its political-economic doctrine, the Murabitun movement has no counterparts in the Western Sufi milieu. Some scholars argue that the movement is much closer to Islamist movements, while others associate it with a category of "militant Sufism".

Others note that in their quest to implement their social and political projects and reach a wider audience, including non-Muslims, the Murabitun, like other Western ṭarīqas, have been overshadowed by less exotic "Islamic traditionalism". The principle of the Murabitun is to maintain outward rational sobriety while striving to internally achieve Sufi "madness-in-Allah".

Overall, Sufism plays an integral role in the movement, as evidenced in almost all Murabitun writings, where classical Sufi terminology is extensively used. In his work The Hundred Steps, Abdalqadir writes about taṣawwuf: "Sufism is the science of the journey to the King." Other important works by Abdalqadir, which demonstrate the significance of Sufism for the Murabitun, include Qur'anic Tawhid and the novel The Book of Strangers.

== Other features of the Murabitun ==
=== Reevaluation of women's role in Islam ===
Shaykh Abdalqadir is known for his reevaluation of the role of women and their activity in Islam, sharply criticizing many traditional Islamic practices (such as isolation from society, wearing black clothing, and veiling the face).

=== Eurocentrism ===
A distinctive feature of Murabitun communities, at least in Europe, has been their pronounced European character, as their members were either native Europeans or foreigners willing to adopt the language and culture of the host country, which fundamentally distinguished them from immigrant Muslim communities.

However, a certain cultural Eurocentrism never hindered the movement from actively and successfully engaging with people from other cultures; the movement never limited itself by national or racial characteristics. The approach of Abdalqadir and his disciples has always been characterized by operating in the space between East and West. The works of the shaykh follow the development of Western thought from classical antiquity to Heidegger and refute the idea of Islam's alienness to Western civilization in its historical form.

Despite this, cultural Eurocentrism marginalizes the movement in the broader context of the Islamic Ummah and often becomes the subject of criticism from conservative Islamic movements, for whom "the image of an 'alim who wears an expensive suit and a Swiss watch, and who smokes cigars while listening to Wagner, is not compatible with the behavior of a decent Muslim."

Nevertheless, the Murabitun have become a symbol of processes described as "repositioning of Islamic revival as emanating from the West and back into the Arab world", freeing Muslims from the imposed "defensive mode" and representing "the most far-reaching and successful Islamic da'wa (the proselytizing of Islam) in the twentieth century."

=== Islamic post-secular Utopia ===
The Murabitun are a vivid example of a phenomenon described as Islamic post-secular Utopia or religious millennialism — an ideological narrative aimed against Western Modernity and anticipating the onset of a new golden age. In territories such as Spain and South Africa, which are considered "frontiers" for the Murabitun, it appeals to the idealized past of these lands, where once great Islamic presence is prepared for revival. This narrative has a powerful influence on converts disillusioned with Modernity and seeking an escape from the complexities of nowaday's world.

=== The Murabitun and Islamic extremism ===
Having developed their political program in the late 1970s, the Murabitun theoretically positioned themselves as an organization whose tasks included preparation for jihad against the established socio-economic system. However, the Murabitun never advocated violence, and their main contribution to global Islam was rather the promotion and popularization of classical Islamic knowledge.

Abdalqadir as-Sufi has consistently identified terrorism and suicide tactics as forbidden and alien to Islam, and indeed as a phenomenon with no precursor in Muslim history. Instead, he states that its original appearance as a tactic and a psychology was among the Isma'ili sect of Shi'a Islam, and that it later emerged among the Russian nihilists of the late 19th century.

=== Critique and contradictions ===
The Murabitun express a unique combination of ideas, many of which, however, are considered сontentious and at odds with the mainstream Muslim opinion.

- They attempted to formulate a concept of authentic proto-madhhab while loudly proclaiming their strict adherence to the Maliki legal school.
- They opposed constitutionalism and criticized the ideology of the Muslim Brotherhood's leader Hassan al-Banna, who saw the caliph as a constitutional monarch, while enthusiastically endorsing the institution of monarchy and hereditary rule.
- The Murabitun advocate a certain separatism from society and anti-assimilation; yet, on the other hand, the movement encourages active political engagement. Criticizing modern democracy, they urge their members to influence politics through participating in elections.
- Some former members of the Murabitun noted a tendency for "shaykhism" within the movement: an excessive dependence on the leader's dictate, whom some accuse in developing a "guru syndrome" over time.
- Prohibition of paper money, permission of music, and the rejection of niqab in Europe face sharp criticism from conservative Islamic groups, who consider such an approach to be innovation (bid'ah).
- Abdalqadir's position on the Palestinian issue is also atypical and has been criticized, as according to the shaykh, it serves to disorient the Ummah and divert the attention of Muslims worldwide from other equally important issues, such as the situation of Muslims in India and the genocide of Uyghurs in China.

== Legacy ==
=== Murabitun's influence ===
Murabitun-inspired communities and influential figures have emerged across Spanish (Umar Vadillo, communities in Granada and Seville), German (Abu Bakr Rieger and the Weimar Institute), Sulaiman Wilms and the Islamische Zeitung, English (shaykh Abdalhaq Bewley, the Mosque of Norwich), American (shaykh Hamza Yusuf and Zaytuna College), and Russian (Harun Sidorov and the National Organization of Russian Muslims) Islamic milieu. These groups have continued the Murabitun's historical mission independently, each with their unique approaches.

=== "Public intellectual convert Sufis" ===
The Murabitun created an image of the European Sufi-intellectual, equally well-versed in both European and Islamic heritage, whose appearance blends Western elements, such as the classical suit, with Eastern ones, such as fezzes and turbans. Many of the early converts of the Murabitun now hold prominent positions in academia and offer a "sophisticated cultural critique of both Western culture and decadent tendencies in the global Muslim scene." Researchers refer to this phenomenon as "public intellectual convert Sufis" (PICS).

=== Literary output ===
The most significant influence of the Murabitun has been the growing interest in classical Islamic heritage due to a series of works translated into English by authors well known within the movement, such as Abdalhaqq and Aisha Bewley, Abdassamad Clarke, and Ali Laraki. Among these translations are Al-Muwatta of Imam Malik (the foundational text of the Maliki madhhab), published in 1992, and the Quran, published in 1999. Additionally, English translations of works on fiqh and Sufism by renowned scholars such as Ibn Ajiba, Ahmad al-Alawi, Usman dan Fodio, and several other classical Islamic authors were published for the first time.

The Murabitun also organized a series of conferences on Maliki fiqh held in Norwich, Granada, and Tunisia.

== Organizational form ==
The Jumua Mosque of Cape Town, established by Abdalqadir as-Sufi and members of the Murabitun

The Murabitun organise themselves around emirs. This is distinct from the role of the movement's founder, Abdalqadir as-Sufi, who, while exercising an undoubted influence, is a spiritual guide rather than a political leader – an arrangement common throughout the history of Islam.
