= Aryan Islam =

Far-right movement among Russian Muslims

Aryan Islam (арийский ислам, arijskij islam) is a far-right movement among Russian Muslims that combines elements of Islam, Russian nationalism, and racial ideology. Its doctrine presents Islam as a vehicle for the revival of the Russian nation and the white race.

The movement began to take shape in the early 2000s and is linked to groups such as the National Organization of Russian Muslims. A significant proportion of its adherents espouse Wahhabi principles. In their Declaration on the Formation of the Russian Muslim Movement, Aryan Islamists express their aspiration to establish themselves as the "vanguard bastion of the Aryan race".

Adherents of Aryan Islam have frequently been criticised within Russia for their chauvinistic and xenophobic views, prompting them to seek support in the West. As a result, they affiliated themselves with the Murabitun World Movement, which advocates Islam in societies where it is not the majority religion.
