= Harrak =

Harrak (Arabic: الحراق) refers to the last name carried by the Northern Moroccan families that claim descent from the sons of Al-Harrak; one of the direct descendants of the Islamic prophet, Muhammad, through Ali ibn Abu Talib and Fatimah

== Other spellings used for Harrak ==
Al Harrak sons and grandsons carry the last names of: Harrak, Harraki, Harraq, Arraki, Al Harrak, Harrak Srifi, Al Harrak Al Srifi, and also El Harrak. Some variant namings exist such as: Charif al Harrak or Sayyed al Harrak; as Charif, Sharif and Sayyed (also Sayid, Sayyid and Sayed) are terms used for the descendants of Muhammad.

== Harrak Family Tree ==
Harrak families originate from the Srif tribe known also as Ahl Srif, and they are from the Idrissites Alawite Musawite branch. Harrak Sidi Muhamad is the son of Muhamad son of Abdelouahid son of Yahya son of Omar son of Hassan son of Husayn son of Ali son of Muhamad son of Abdullah son of Yussuf son of Ahmad son of Husayn son of Malik son of Abdelkarim son of Hamdoun son of Musa (Musa is the brother of Abdeslam Ben Mchich) son of Mchich son of Abi Bakr al Alami al Idrissi son of Ali son of Abu Hurma son of Issa son of Salam al-Arouss son of Ahmad Mizwar son of Ali Haydara son of Muhammad son of Idris II son of Idris I son of Abdullah al-Kamel son of Hassan al-Muthanna son of Hasan ibn Ali son of Ali Ibn Abi Talib and Fatimah, daughter of Muhammad.

The great-grandfather Sidi Mohammed al-Harraq al-Alami (1772–1845) was a leading Sufi figure. He was famous of his known religious and wisdom book called Diwan al Harrak ar:الحراق. The Harrak religious institution (zawiyya) carries over the preservation of Sidi Muhammad heritage.

Diwan Al Harrak is a valuable source that is often used as reference in the study of religious literature history in Morocco. The Harrak and other Sayyid families in Morocco were subject to study and investigation by senior Muslim scholars like Ayatollah Muhammad Ali Taskhiri who is the head of Iran's Global Assembly for Proximity of Islamic Schools of Thoughts. The latter is known as moderate and open to not only the intra-Islamic discourse, but also intra-religious discourse and understanding. Russian President Putin in a Moscow Religion Conference, where Ayatollah Taskhiri represented the Muslim world, qualified the efforts of the later as cornerstone.

Sayyid families in Morocco have suffered the same fate their cousins met in Iraq. Ashura has repeated itself in the Maghreb about a century after the Karbala Tragedy.

It has been reported by the judge and scholar of his time Muhamad Bin Ali Hashlaf Al-Jazaeri that over 400 members of the descendants of Mulay Idriss were killed by the army of Musa Ibn Abi Al-Afia al-Miknasi. After that, the descendants of Muhammad migrated to the mountains mainly -Jabal Al Alam and Hajar al Nasr- in Northern Morocco (Larache-Tétouan-Tangier Triangle) to flee persecution. However, that did not last too long like in the caliphate controlled territories. In Morocco after only decades of persecution, The Sayyid families regained recognition and protection by most dynasties that followed the early persecution decades.

== Notable people ==
- Ahmed Harrak Srifi, Moroccan scholar
- Ayoub El Harrak (born 1999), Belgian footballer
- Ayub El Harrak (born 1994), Moroccan footballer
- Yasser Harrak, Canadian writer and commentator

== See also ==
- Mohammed al-Harraq al-Alami
- Idrisid dynasty
- History of Morocco
- Ahl al-Bayt
