= Polosin =

Polosin (masculine, Russian: Полосин) or Polosina (feminine, Russian: Полосина) is a Russian surname. Notable people with the surname include:

- Alexey Polosin (1924–1943), Soviet military officer
- Anatoli Polosin (1935–1997), Russian soccer coach
- Vyacheslav Polosin (born 1956), Russian Muslim academic
