= National Organization of Russian Muslims =

Religious organization in Russia

The flag of the Russian Muslims

The National Organization of Russian Muslims (NORM) is an organization of the Russian Muslims, founded in 2004 on the basis of Russian Muslim communities of Moscow (Banu Zulkarnain), Yoshkar-Ola (Tsaryovokokshaysk Community of Russian Muslims), Omsk and Almaty.

NORM positions itself as a base for creation of a new sub-ethnic group — Russian Muslims.

== Core ideas ==
Initially, NORM aimed to represent the interests of all Russian Muslims regardless of their religious and political affiliations, both within and outside the Russian Muslim community. Leaders of NORM sought to provide an alternative to various spiritual administrations, tarīqas, and jamāʿats, facilitating coordination among ethnic Russian Muslims to promote their rights and interests.

Key objectives included:

- Encouraging ethnic Russians and other non-Muslim nations to embrace Islam.
- Fostering the formation of Russian Muslim families and organic communities.
- Filtering Russian culture through Islamic norms. Rediscovering or reclaiming forgotten or abandoned ethnic heritage within the framework of Islam. Cultural advocacy.

NORM leaders emphasized the necessity of this approach for Russian Muslims, advocating for their participation in Islam as a cohesive ethnic group, distinct from both the majority of Russians, whose identity is closely tied to Russian Orthodoxy, and the ethnic Muslim populations, preserving its identity granted by God.

== History ==
=== Formation period (2004–2009) ===
In 2003, in Moscow, Harun ar-Rusi (Vadim Sidorov, b. 1977), influenced by his teacher, philosopher, and political activist of Russian-Azerbaijani origin Geydar Dzhemal, embraced Islam and founded the Jamaat of Russian Muslims "Banu Zulkarnayn," initially comprising about ten individuals.

The first founding congress of the NORM was held in Omsk in June 2004 with the participation of Muslim organizations from Moscow, Omsk, Yoshkar-Ola, and Alma-Ata. Shortly after, the Russian Muslim communities of Saint Petersburg and Rostov-on-Don also merged with the new organization.

The ideological inspirer of the NORM, Geydar Dzhemal, was present at the first press conference. There was a shift from acute controversy to cooperation with the former priest of Russian Orthodox Church, now well-known Islamic scholar Vyacheslav Polosin, who joined the organization in 2006.

Initially, the organization comprised both Shii and Sunni Muslims. However, a split occurred later, resulting in Shiis gradually leaving the organization and its core turning to Sunni Islam, adopting its at that time popular Salafi interpretation. At the same time the interactions with Geydar Dzhemal, whom the opponents of the Organization were usually referring as the founder of NORM, were stopped.

During this time, the organization actively participated in Russian politics; however, some consider this participation unsuccessful. Supporters of the NORM maintained ties with official Islamic bodies in Russia, held moderate and occasionally pro-government positions, which allowed them to widely present their activities in the public sphere and attract new supporters.

=== Oppositional (Murabitun) period (2009–2013) ===
This period is characterized by NORM activists leaving Russia, initiating resistance against the country's political direction, and aligning with the Murabitun World Movement.

In 2007 there was the first contact between the NORM and Murabitun World Movement and its leader Abdalqadir as-Sufi, with Harun Sidorov becoming his disciple.

Until 2008 the NORM was the proponent of the Salafi theology. In 2008 it was decided to shift to the classical Ashari School of Theology and Maliki madhab, which was the official madhhab of Murabitun. NORM activists also joined the Shadhiliyya-Darqawiyya-Habibiyya Sufi brotherhood.

The choice of the Maliki legal school was explained by NORM leaders as a necessity for Russian Muslims to follow a madhhab different from the traditional Hanafi madhhab of Tatars and the Shafi'i madhhab of Caucasians, aiming to avoid assimilation into these groups and potential conflicts. However, NORM acknowledged adherence to any of the four traditional madhhabs, while criticism was directed towards "bezmazkhabniki" (people without a madhhab) and Salafists.

NORM established its own Maliki Center, actively promoting the Maliki school of law among Russian Muslims by translating and publishing key literature of the madhhab. At the same time, critics within the movement claimed that NORM and Murabitun were not classic representatives of the Maliki school but attempted to create a fifth "Medinan" madhhab based on it.

In 2008, Harun Sidorov, facing persecution by security services, was forced to leave Russia. "I made the decision to leave my homeland in 2008 after consulting with my comrades, because, alas, I accurately predicted that it would develop in a direction where I wouldn't belong." During this period, the activities of the NORM, along with its key members, were relocated abroad.

In 2011–2012, members of the NORM actively participated in protest actions at Bolotnaya Square in Moscow. On December 27, 2011, at the initiative of NORM, independent Muslim leaders signed the Islamic Civil Charter, including philosopher Geidar Dzhemal, activist Abdulla Rinat Mukhametov, writer and human rights defender Fauzia Bayramova, publisher Aslambek Ezhaev, and others.

=== Slavic-Islamic period (2013–2017) ===
This period is characterized by active involvement of NORM members in events in Ukraine and an attempt to establish a Slavic-Islamic union.

In 2013, there was a divergence between the paths of NORM activists and the Murabitun movement. Sidorov believed that "Murabitun's central leadership had definitively decided to cease its existence as a movement, which contributed to our disagreements as we sought to revitalize it."

From the outset of the Maidan events in Ukraine, culminating in the 2014 Revolution of Dignity, NORM supported Ukrainian Muslims actively resisting the Kremlin's dictatorship. V. Sidorov portrayed Ukraine as a destination for emigration (referring to Islamic term hijrah) for Slavic-Muslims: "Today we are fighting for Rus-Ukraine together, seeing it as a place that could become an Ethiopia for Slavic-speaking Muslims of the post-Soviet countries, including Russia, from which hijrah becomes urgently necessary for Russian Muslims."

In the same year, local supporters of the organization, together with NORM, established the Slavic-Islamic League (SILA). To promote the concept of Slavic-Muslims and the idea of a Slavic-Islamic union, the medieval Arabic term "Saqaliba," referring to people from Central and Eastern Europe, was utilized. Contacts were also established with Ukrainian traditionalists and nationalist organizations. NORM established allied and friendly relations with many well-known Muslims in Ukraine, as well as with a number of Ukrainian public figures and intellectuals.

=== Islamo-European period (2017–2019) ===
In 2017, NORM activists in European countries launched the Islam4Europeans project — an English-language platform for indigenous European Muslims. Its core ideas largely mirrored those of NORM but on a pan-Western scale, aiming to establish new frameworks for bringing together European converts to Islam. To pursue his new activities within the Russian political sphere, Harun Sidorov announced the transfer of NORM and the 'Islam4Europeans' project in December 2019.

Sidorov regarded Russia as part of Western civilization, thus Russian converts from NORM organically belonged to the same cultural space, "to which converts from England, Germany, and Sweden also belong." Parallel to this, in 2018, there was a rebranding of NORM's previous projects, culminating in the "Russian Muslims" website.

Sidorov's key ideas during this period are reflected in his book "The Unfinished Revolution," critiсising historical Russian statehood and the Russian Orthodox Church. Sidorov emerged as a political activist advocating for the reformatting of Russia with an orientation toward a union of Russian radicals and the national republics of the Russian Federation.

In December 2019, Sidorov announced the transfer of the Islam4Europeans project due to his shift into political activities.

== Criticism and accusations of extremism ==
Critics argue that NORM uses Islam as a front for its political agenda. They claim the organization's core beliefs lean towards right-wing ideology, with some even accusing it of promoting fascist ideas, using the fascination with the relevant aesthetics and terminology of some of the leaders of the movement in the early days of their activities. NORM representatives have repeatedly denied these accusations.

Meanwhile, some indigenous Muslim groups in Russia view NORM as a misguided sect, feeling its goals don't align with theirs. Observers note that this isolation might stem from ethnic Muslims' lack of acknowledgment of NORM's beliefs. However, attempts to establish a distinct "Russian Nation of Islam" have led some ethnic Muslims to see Russian Muslims as prioritizing nationality over religion.

Another critique, from the conservative group Dar ul-Fikr, argues that Islam is incompatible with Western culture, of which the NORM leaders were prominent representatives. "They consciously employ the European discourse and preach a Western lifestyle." Things that Sheikh Abdalqadir as-Sufi considered legitimate, such as the permissibility of music and smoking, criticism of the niqab in Western countries, and criticism of the modern monetary system, were viewed unfavorably from the perspective of conservative Hanafi theology. "In the eyes of Dar ul-Fikr, the image of an 'alim who wears an expensive suit and a Swiss watch, and who smokes cigars while listening to Wagner, is not compatible with the behaviour of a decent Muslim."

== Elitist vision of Islam ==
Another pole of understanding the movement is its representation as an "intellectualized" version of Islam. Its leaders sought to position themselves as the 'vanguard of the Russian Ummah,' and some converts claimed to have embraced Islam under the influence of intellectuals like Harun Sidorov or Salman Sever.

R. Bekkin considers Russian Muslims not so much an elite of the Russian Ummah but of Russian society as a whole. "They are an intellectual elite that is reflecting about the meaning of life, that is searching for itself, that does not want to walk the well-trodden path and to simply follow the religion of their ancestors. Of such people there are always but a few, and there is no reason to instil fear and to believe in the myth that Russia's Islamisation is imminent."

Harun Sidorov defends the view that Europeans who embrace Islam are valuable "Kulturträger" (transmitters of cultural ideas) not only for Europe but also for the Islamic world. "In his opinion, these 'organic communities' of Spanish, German, Ukrainian and Russian Muslims continue and advance the 'true' and 'genuinely' European values and cultures; at the same time, they are also the hope for reformation in the Islamic world

In contrast to so-called "traditional Islam", NORM envelopes "the religion of a free, independent, rational individual who feels that she or he is a part of Russian culture." Sidorov himself "emphasised his discovery of Islam as a 'very beautiful, very powerful intellectual doctrine'."

The movement was deeply influenced by the philosopher Geydar Dzhemal, "the 'Godfather' of Russian right-wing converts", who presented Islam as a religion of intellectuals and passionaries.

== Problematics of "Russianness" ==
In recent years, there has been a significant decline in the emphasis on "Russianness" in the public activities of NORM leaders. This is because self-identification as Russian has become increasingly problematic since the Russian Orthodox Church officially declared that a Russian is someone who "recognizes Orthodox Christianity as the basis of national spiritual culture; [...] feels solidarity with the fate of the Russian people" However, some converts are attempting to broaden the religious adherence within Russian identity, to counter accusations of disloyalty to the Russian ethnic group.

== The artistry of Russian Muslims ==
The creative output of Russian Muslims, often associated with NORM, is a phenomenon that researchers also explore alongside their political and religious engagements.

Dmitrii (Muslim) Akhtiamov's novel "The Islamic Breakthrough" (Islamskii proryv), published in 2005 by Ul'tra.Kul'tura publisher, was the first significant literary work by an author who identified himself as a Russian Muslim.

The same year saw the establishment of The Islamic Breakthrough literary award, named after Akhtiamov's novel and founded by the renowned poet, translator, and publisher Ilya Kormiltsev.

In 2012, NORM activists compiled the anthology "The Saber of Islam" (Sablya islama), which featured poetic works and the organization's ideological stance at the time.

The musical scene also saw contributions from rapper E. Dubrovin, known as Dub Dervish.

In 2020, Alif TV, a channel focusing on Muslim life, aired an in-depth feature on Djawhar Kutb, a prominent poet and Russian Muslim.
