= Shadhili =

Sufi mystic order in Sunni Islam

The Shadhili Order (Arabic: الطريقة الشاذلية) is a tariqah or Sufi order. The Shadhili order was founded by Abu al-Hasan al-Shadhili in the 13th century and is followed by millions of people around the world. Many followers (Arabic murids, "seekers") of the Shadhili Order are known as Shadhilis, and a single follower is known as Shadhili.

It has historically been of importance and influence in the Maghreb and Egypt with many contributions to Islamic literature. Among the figures most known for their literary and intellectual contributions are ibn Ata Allah al-Iskandari, author of the Hikam, and Ahmad Zarruq, author of numerous commentaries and works, and Ahmad ibn Ajiba who also wrote numerous commentaries and works.

In poetry expressing love of Muhammad, there have been the notable contributions of Muhammad al-Jazuli, author of the Dala'il al-Khayrat, and al-Busiri, author of the famous poem Al-Burda or "The Celestial Lights in Praise of the Best of Creation". Many of the head lecturers of al-Azhar University in Cairo have also been followers of this tariqa.

Of the various branches of the Shadhili are the Fassiyatush of Imam Fassi, found largely in India, Sri Lanka, and Pakistan. The Darqawiyya of Muhammad al-Arabi al-Darqawi is found mostly in Morocco, and the Alawi-Darqawiyya of Ahmad al-Alawi, which originated in Algeria, is now found throughout the world, particularly in Syria, Jordan, France, and among many English-speaking communities. British scholar Martin Lings wrote an extensive biography of Ahmad al-Alawi entitled A Moslem Saint of the Twentieth Century.

The anniversary of al-Shadhili is held on 12th of Shawwal (the tenth month of lunar calendar) at Humaithara in Egypt.

== Branches ==
Shadhiliyya has numerous branches across the globe. A few prominent branches are listed below.

=== Fassiyya ===
The Fassiyatush was established by Imam Fassi, a Moroccan by origin who was born in Mecca. Fassiyatush Shadhiliyya is widely practised in India, Sri Lanka, Pakistan, Mauritius and Indonesia. The descendants of al-Fassi, who are sheikhs of the Fassiyatush and reside in Mecca and Jeddah, visit these countries frequently. The international leader of the Fassiyatash is selected from the heirs of al-Fassi, and Shaykh Mahdhi ibn Abdallah al-Fassi is the present leader.

=== Darqawiyya ===
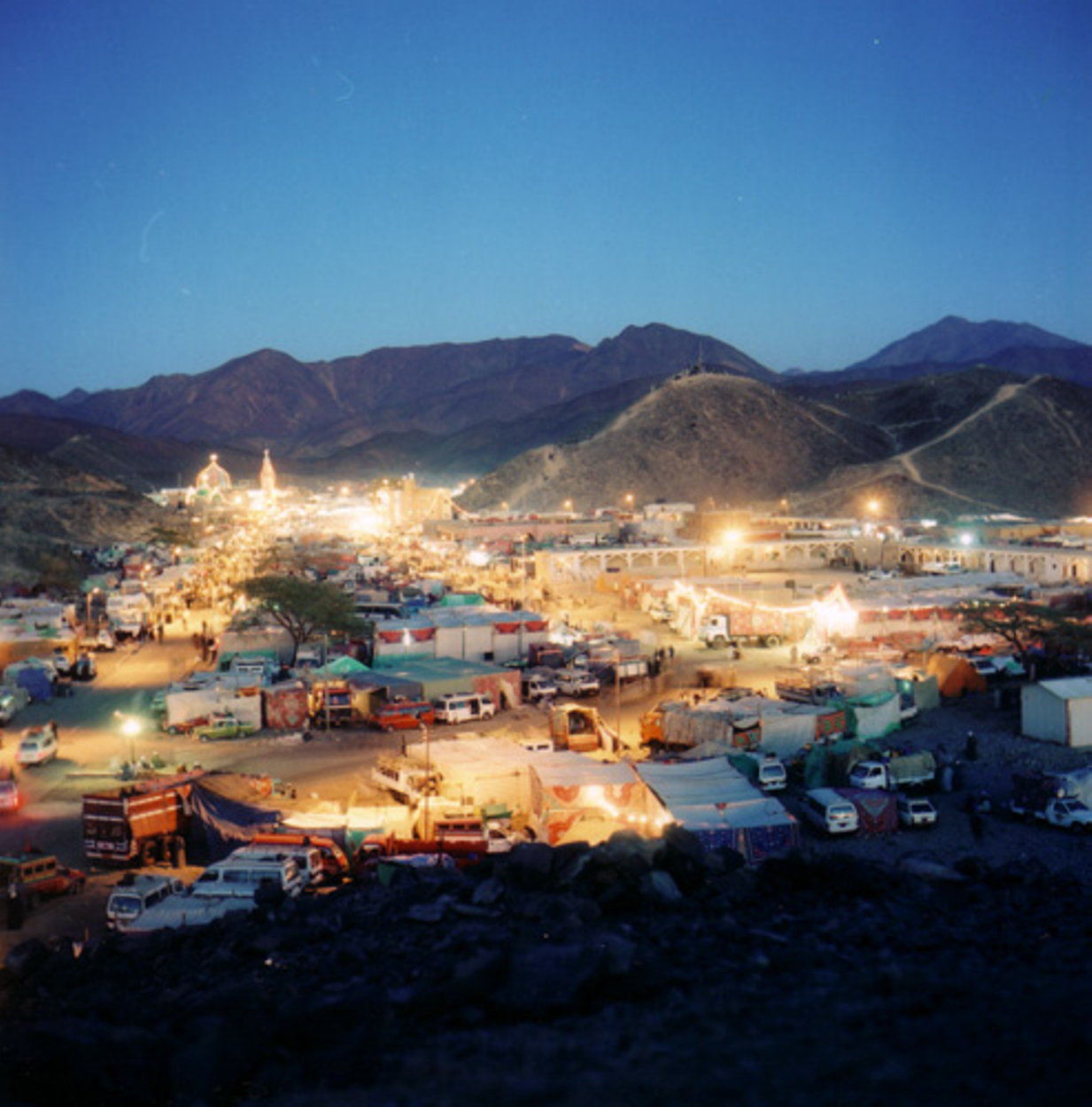
The Holy Dargah of Imam Shadhili, Humaithara, Egypt

The Darqawiyya, a Moroccan branch of the Shadhili order, was founded in the late 18th century by Muhammad al-Arabi al-Darqawi. Selections from the letters of al-Darqawi were translated by the Shadhili Titus Burckhardt and more recently by the scholar Aisha Abdurrahman Bewley. One of the first tariqas to be established in the West was the Alawiya branch of the Darqawiyya, which was named after Ahmad al-Alawi, popularly known as "Shaykh al-Alawi".

=== Attasiyah ===
The 'Attasiyah Order is a branch of the 'Alawi Order, founded by Umar bin Abdur Rahman bin Aqil al-Attas. It is centered in Yemen but also has centers in Pakistan, India, and Myanmar. The 'Alawiya order in Yemen has recently been studied by the anthropologist David Buchman. In his article "The Underground Friends of God and Their Adversaries: A Case Study and Survey of Sufism in Contemporary Yemen", Professor Buchman summarizes the results of his six-month period of fieldwork in Yemen. The article was originally published in the journal Yemen Update

=== Darqawi Hashimiya ===
The Darqawi-Alawi branch of the Shadili Tariqa established itself in Damascus and the Levant through Sheikh Muhammad al-Hashimi al-Tilmisani, the son of an Algerian qadi, who migrated to Damascus along with his spiritual guide Ibn Yallis. After the death of Ibn Yallis, Hashimi was authorized by Sheikh Ahmad al-'Alawi in the early 1920s and was made his deputy in Damascus.

The most well known living spiritual guide of this branch of the Shadhili tariqa is Sheikh Nuh Ha Mim Keller, an American scholar, author, and translator, who resides in Amman, Jordan, and Sheikh Abd al-Aziz al-Khateeb from Damascus. Both were authorized by Sheikh Abd al Rahman Al Shaghouri, who was himself a student of Sheikh Muhammad al-Hashimi al-Tilmisani. Sheikh Muhammad Said al-Jamal ar-Rifa'i, another student of Sheikh Muhammad al-Hashimi al-Tilmisani who died in 2015, had worked from the Haram al-Sharif in Jerusalem and was a mufti of the Hanbali Madhab. He wrote many books on Sufism, Tafsir, and healing, and his students established the University of Spiritual Healing and Sufism, now formally known as the University of Sufism.

=== Badawiyya ===
The Badawiyya is another branch of the Shadhilia, with groups in Egypt, Indonesia, Turkey, and America, founded by Ibrahim al-Badawi, for many years professor at al-Azhar. He was a confrere of Sheikh Abdu-l-Halim Mahmud, Shaikh al-Azhar, who was very influential in the revival of Sufism in Egypt. Sheikh Ibrahim's student, Nooruddeen Durkee, has established the Badawiyya order in the United States. Nooruddeen Durkee has translated and transliterated the Qur'an and has compiled two definitive books on the Shadhali, including The School of the Shadhdhuliyyah, Volume One: Orisons.

=== Maryamiyya ===
The Maryamiyya Order was founded by Swiss-German metaphysician Frithjof Schuon, author of The Transcendent Unity of Religions, among other influential books, as an outgrowth of the Alawiyya order. In 1936, Schuon and his disciples understood him to have been invested as an independent sheikh. In 1965, he began having visions of Maryam (as the Virgin Mary is known in Islam), who the Order is named after. The Maryamiyya Order was largely formed around Perennial philosophy and Neoplatonism, and heavily influenced by Advaita Vedanta and Guénon's Traditionalist School.

== Influence ==
=== On Christianity ===
Miguel Asín Palacios has suggested that the Shadhili order drew detailed connections between the teachings of ibn Abbad al-Rundi and John of the Cross, such as in the account of the Dark Night of the Soul.

José Nieto, on the other hand, argues that these mystical doctrines are quite general, and that while similarities exist between the works of John, ibn Abbad and other Shadhilis, these reflect independent development, not influence.

== The Spiritual Chain ==
Every tariqa must have a chain of transmission and authorization to be recognized as valid. Most of the chains start from Ali ibn Abi Talib and goes as 2 branches one through his son Hasan ibn Ali and another through Husayn ibn Ali.

- Muhammad
- Ali
- Hasan ibn Ali
- Jabir ibn Abd Allah
- Sa‘id al-Ghazwani
- Abu Muhammad Fath al-Su'ood
- Abu Muhammad Sa'eed
- Abul Qasim Ahmad ibn Marwani
- Sayyid Ishaq Ibrahim al-Basri
- Zayn al-Din al-Qazwini
- Shams al-Din
- Muhammad Taj al-Din
- Nur al-Din Abul Hasan ‘Ali
- Fakhr al-Din
- Tuqayy al-Din al-Fuqayr
- ‘Abd al-Rahman al-Madani al-‘Attar al-Zayyat
- Abd al-Salam ibn Mashish al-Alami
- al-Shadhili

== See also ==
- Chishti
- Qadiriyya
- Wazifa Zarruqiyya
