= Abdul Rachid Soufi =

Somali-Qatari Qāriʾ

Sheikh Abdul Rachid Soufi Mufti
- Abdirashiid Ali Abdirahmaan Suufi عبد الرشيد علي عبد الرحمن صوفي
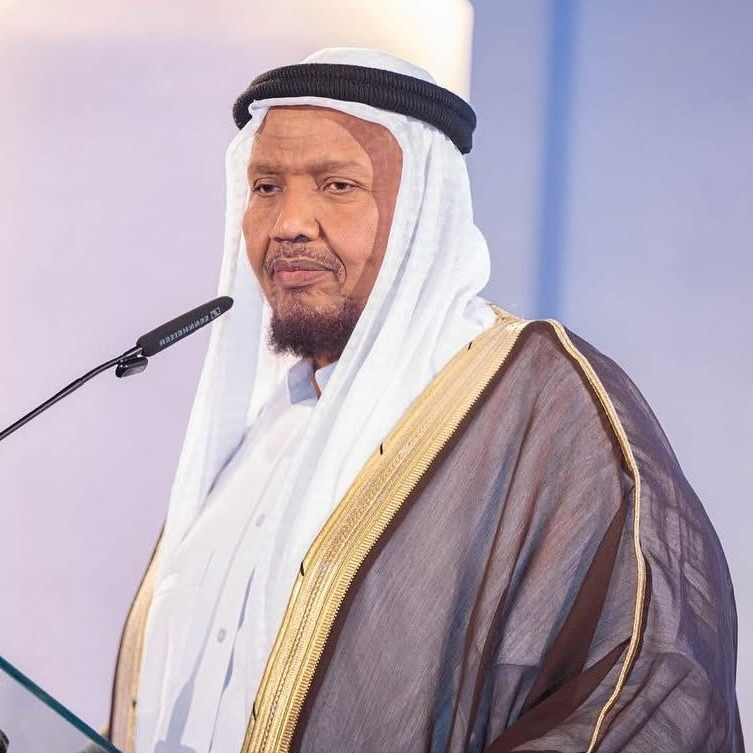
- Title: Sheikh Qāriʾ imam

Personal life
- Born: January 1, 1962 (age 64) Somalia
- Citizenship: Somali; Qatari
- Education: Al-Azhar University
- Occupation: Qāriʾ

Religious life
- Religion: Islam
- Denomination: Sunni

Sheikh Abdul Rashiid Ali Abdulrahman Sufi (Somali: Cabdirashiid Cali Cabdiraxmaan Suufi; born 1 January 1962, Arabic: عبد الرشيد علي عبد الرحمن صوفي) also known as Abdel Rashiid Ali Sufi is a professional Quran reciter who holds an advanced degree in the ten Quranic recitations and is a former mufti in Somalia. He holds both Somali and Qatari citizenship.

== Life ==
Soufi was born on 01 January 1962 in Somalia and settled in Qatar in 1991. In 1989, during the reign of the secular dictator Siad Barre, he was arrested for extremism following the assassination of Catholic priest Salvatore Colombo. Many scholars have graduated under his guidance, and he has established numerous schools and centers for learning and teaching the Quran. The latest of these is his famous mosque in Mogadishu, named Sheikh Ali Soufi Mosque. He currently serves as the imam of Anas ibn Malik Mosque in the Qatari capital, Doha. He also participates as an accredited judge in Quran recitation competitions, including his role as a judge in the Tejan Al-Noor competition, held annually by the Qatari Jeem TV.

== Education ==
He completed memorizing the Quran at the age of ten and then mastered the science of Tajweed under the guidance of his father, Sheikh Ali Abdulrahman Soufi, according to the narration of Hafs ‘an ‘Asim. Subsequently, he learned the seven Quranic recitations through the Shatibiyyah method and listened to his father's explanation of the Shatibiyyah more than three times, eventually memorizing it.

== Egypt ==
He travelled to Egypt to complete readership in October 1981, there was a regular at the Readings Institute, and received a high degree in the 10 readings of this Institute.

Sheikh Muhammad bin Ismail Al-Hamdhani granted him two certifications with his connected chain of narration to the Islamic prophet Muhammad. The first certification is in the ten Quranic recitations through the Shatibiyyah and Durrah methods, and the second is in the ten Quranic recitations through the Tayyibah method.

== Qatar ==
He arrived in Qatar in 1991, where he has been working since his arrival at the Qatari Ministry of Awqaf and Islamic Affairs as an imam and preacher at Anas ibn Malik Mosque in the Central Market area of Doha. He now holds Qatari citizenship.

== Religious seminars ==
He has participated in several meetings, religious lectures, Quran recitations, and led prayers outside of Qatar, including in various Arab and European countries.

- Participated in the Emamah of Tarawih Prayer on the night of the 27th of Ramadan in 1433H - Kuwait

== Quranic recitations ==
- Riwayah Shu'bah on the authority of 'Asim
- The recited Qur’an narrated by Hafs on the authority of Asim, the reciter Abdul Rashid Sufi
- The recited Qur’an narrated by Khalaf on the authority of Hamzah - reciter Abdul Rashid Sufi
- The recited Qur’an narrated by Al-Duri (Basri) on the authority of Abu Amr, the reciter Abd al-Rashid Sufi
- The recited Qur’an narrated by Al-Susi on the authority of Abu Amr, the reciter Abd al-Rashid Sufi
- [https://www.nquran.com/ar/categories/540/

Riwayah Abu-al-Harith on the authority of Al-Kisai]

- [https://www.nquran.com/ar/categories/542

Riwayah Al-Duri (Ali) on the authority of Al-Kisai]

== See also ==
- Muhammad Rashad al-Sharif
