= Zawiya of Sidi Taoudi Ben Souda =

Religious building in Fez, Morocco

Coordinates: 34°03′45″N 4°58′32.5″W

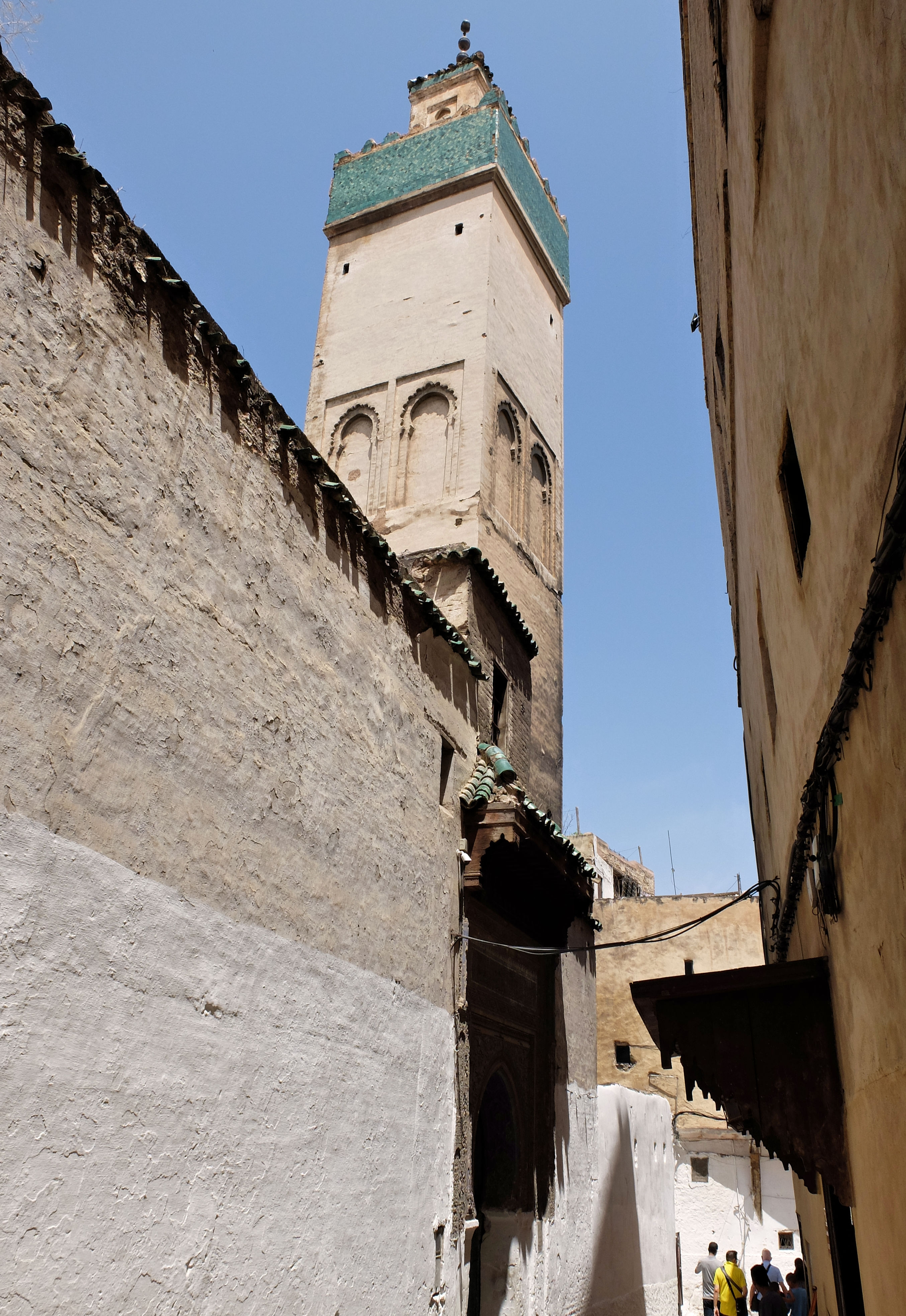
Minaret and street entrance of the zawiya

The Zawiya of Sidi Taoudi Ben Souda (also spelled Zawiya of Sidi Tawdi ibn Suda) is a zawiya (religious complex) and mosque in Fes el-Bali, the old medina of Fes, Morocco. It is named after Muḥammad al-Tāwdī Ibn al-Ṭālib Ibn Sūda al-Murrī (died 1795), an 18th-century Sufi sheikh who is considered by some to be one of the foremost intellectuals and Muslim scholars of Morocco's history.

The zawiya is located off Zqaq Bghal street in the Souk Ben Safi neighbourhood. It consists mainly of a mosque, which includes a prayer hall with an inner courtyard (sahn), an ablutions house, and a minaret. The tomb of Sidi Taoudi Ben Souda is located along the qibla wall (southeastern wall), marked by a wooden cenotaph. The mosque's mihrab is decorated with carved and painted stucco and is flanked on one side by two Arabic inscriptions on zellij tiles. The minaret's main shaft is 20.3 meters tall, while its secondary shaft or lantern is 4.3 meters tall.
