= Wazifa Zarruqiyya =

Dhikr in Sufism

- Author: Ahmad Zarruq
- Original title: سَفِينَةُ النَّجَا لِمَنْ إِلَى اللَهِ اِلْتَجَا
- Working title: الوظيفة الزروقية
- Language: Arabic
- Subject: Dhikr, Dua, Wird
- Genre: Wazifa
- Publication place: Maghreb

In Sufism, the Wazifa Zarruqiyya (Arabic: الْوَظِيفَةُ الزَّرُّوقِيَّةُ) is a regular wazifa or litany practiced by followers in the Shadhili order of Sufism and whose first line is "the ship of salvation for those who resort to God" (Arabic: سَفِينَةُ النَّجَا لِمَنْ إِلَى اللَهِ اِلْتَجَا).

== Presentation ==
This wazifa was initiated and compiled by the Maliki Sunni Sufi theologian Ahmad Zarruq (1442–1493 CE), the founder of the Zarruqi branch of Shadhili Sufism, to train his murids or followers to recite morning and evening litanies daily. This Muslim scholar and sufi sheikh assembled a panoply of Quranic ayahs and prophetic duas dedicated to the morning and night litanies to which the murids must assiduously submit. Zarruq, who studied in Béjaïa, is well-known in the Muslim world

The components of this wazifa were taken from the "Chapter of the morning and evening Adhkar" in the book written by al-Nawawi (1233–1277) entitled Selected Remembrances from the Words of the Master of the Righteous (Adhkar Nawawiyya).

There is no Sufism except through fiqh, and there is no fiqh but through Sufism.

== Practice ==
This wazifa is recited individually or collectively after Fajr prayer in the morning and after Asr prayer in the afternoon. The recitation begins with the pronunciation of Ta'awwudh then of Basmala followed by Āyah 163 of Surah al-Baqarah.

Next comes the tilawa of Āyah 1 from Surah Al Imran, followed by Āyah 111 of Surah Ta-Ha and then the Throne verse.

Several verses follow each other in the recitation with a specific repetition for each of them. Then the murid recites authentic duas related by Prophet Muhammad, and relating to the morning and evening as well as to personal and congregational well-being.

The content of the wazifa is finally completed with the recitation of the last three verses Āyates 180 to 182 of Surah As-Saaffat.

== See also ==
- Wazifa
- Dua
- Dhikr
- Wird
- Al-Nawawi
- Ahmad Zarruq
- Shadhiliyya
- Adhkar Nawawiyya
