= Muhammad Rashad al-Sharif =

Quran reciter at Al-Aqsa Mosque

Sheikh Muhammad Rashad al-Sharif
- محمد رشاد الشريف

Personal life
- Born: Muhammad Rashad ibn Abd al-Salam ibn Abd al-Rahman al-Sharif; 1925 Hebron, Mandatory Palestine
- Died: 26 September 2016 (aged 90–91) Jordan
- Known for: Official Quran reciter of Al-Aqsa Mosque and the Ibrahimi Mosque
- Occupation: Quran reciter, imam, Arabic language scholar

Religious life
- Religion: Islam
- Denomination: Sunni

Muhammad Rashad Al-Sharif (Arabic: محمد رشاد الشريف) (1925 – 26 September 2016) was a Palestinian Quran reciter, imam, and Arabic language scholar. He served as an official Quran reciter at Al-Aqsa Mosque in Jerusalem and the Ibrahimi Mosque in Hebron. He also taught Arabic at Hebron University and in schools in Jerusalem and Hebron. Al-Sharif was a Quran reciter for Jordan Television. In 2002, he moved to Jordan, where he later served as an imam at the King Abdullah I Mosque in Amman.

== Early life and career ==
Muhammad Rashad Al-Sharif was born in Hebron, Mandatory Palestine, in 1925. He studied Quranic recitation under Sheikh Hussein Ali Abu Sneineh, who granted him ijazah in the Hafs 'an Asim and Warsh methods of recitation. By the age of eighteen, he had mastered Quranic recitation and was influenced by the style of the Egyptian reciter Muhammad Rifat. In the early 1940s, Al-Sharif began reciting on Radio Jerusalem after being recommended by the Mufti of Hebron. In 1966, he was appointed as an official Quran reciter at Al-Aqsa Mosque, where he alternated his recitation duties with his service at the Cave of the Patriarchs in Hebron.

== See also ==
- Abdul Rachid Soufi
- Mahmoud Khalil al-Hussary
- Muhammad Said al-Jamal ar-Rifa'i
- Muhammad Rifat
