= Ibn Kiran =

Muhammad al-Tayyib ibn Kiran (Arabic: محمد الطيب بن كيران; 1172/1758-1227/1812) was a Moroccan, religious scholar from Fes. He also played an active political role.

Ibn Kiran is the author of Risala bn Saud, a response, written at the request of the sultan mulay Slimane, to the manifesto of the Wahhabis. He has written several commentaries, including one on al-Ghazali's Ihya and another on the Alfiyya of Ibn Malik. He also wrote Iqd nafais alla-ali fi tahrik al-himam al-awali, a popular religious work. Ibn Kiran was a teacher at Al-Qarawiyyin University and the teacher of Ahmad Ibn Idris Al-Fasi and Muhammad ibn Ali as-Senussi.

== See also ==
- Ahmad ibn 'Ajiba
- List of Ash'aris and Maturidis
- List of Sufis
