= Ahmad ibn Ajiba =

Moroccan Sufi scholar and poet (1747–1809)

- أحمد بن عجيبة

Personal life
- Born: Abu al-‘Abbas Ahmad b. Muhammad b. al-Mahdi Ibn ‘Ajibah al-Hasani; 1746–1747 al-Khamīs, Morocco
- Died: 1809 Tetouan, Morocco
- Notable works: Al-Bahr Al-Madid (The Immense Ocean); Mi'raj al-tashawwuf ila haqa'iq al-tasawwuf (The Book of Ascension); Al-ʿumda fī sharḥ al-burda; Īqāẓ al-himam fī sharḥ al-ḥikam; Autobiography (Fahrasa)
- Known for: His works on Sufism and Quranic exegesis
- Occupation: Scholar, poet, Sufi

Religious life
- Religion: Islam
- Tariqa: Darqāwiyya
- Arabic name
- Personal (Ism): Aḥmad
- Patronymic (Nasab): ibn Muḥammad ibn al-Mahdī ibn ʿAjība
- Teknonymic (Kunya): Abu ’l-ʿAbbās
- Toponymic (Nisba): al-Ḥasanī al-Tiṭṭawānī

Aḥmad ibn ʿAjība (Arabic: أحمد بن عجيبة; 1747–1809) was an influential 18th-century Moroccan scholar and poet in the Sunni Darqawa Sufi lineage.

== Biography ==
Aḥmad ibn ʿAjība was born on 1746-1747 in the village al-Khamīs belonging to the Anjra tribe in that area between Tangier and Tétouan. He belonged to a sharīf family of the Anjra.

As a child he developed a love of religious knowledge, memorizing the Qur'an and studying subjects ranging from Classical Arabic grammar, religious ethics, poetry, Qur'anic recitation and tafsir. When he reached the age of eighteen, he left home and undertook the study of exoteric knowledge in Qasr al-Kabir under the supervision of Sidi Muhammad al-Susi al-Samlali. It was here that he was introduced to studies in the sciences, art, philosophy, law and Qur'anic exegesis in depth. He went to Fes to study with Mohammed al-Tawudi ibn Suda, Bennani, and El-Warzazi, and joined the new Darqawiyya in 1208 AH (1793), of which he was the representative in the northern part of the Jbala region. He spent nearly his entire life in and around Tetuan, and died of the plague in 1224 AH (1809). He is the author of over thirty works, including an autobiography, al-Fahrasa, which provides interesting information concerning the intellectual center that Tetuan had become by the beginning of the 19th century.

== Works ==
- The Immense Ocean: Al-Bahr Al-Madid: A Thirteenth Century Quranic Commentary on the Chapters of the All-Merciful, the Event, and Iron (Fons Vitae PublishingFons Vitae, Quranic Commentaries) 2009.
- The Book of Ascension: Looking into the Essential Truths of Sufism (Mi'raj al-tashawwuf ila haqa'iq al-tasawwuf), A Lexicon of Sufic Terminology by Ahmad ibn 'Ajiba, Mohamed Fouad Aresmouk (Translator), Michael Abdurrahman Fitzgerald (Translator). Fons Vitae PublishingFons Vitae 2012; ISBN 978-1-891785-84-9.
- Al-ʿumda fī sharḥ al-burda, ed. ʿAbd al-Salām al-ʿImrānī al-Khālidī, Beirut: Dār al-Kutub al-ʿIlmiyya, 2011.
- Al-durar al-mutanāthira fī tawjīh al-qirāʾāt al-mutawātira, ed. ʿAbd al-Salām al-ʿImrānī al-Khālidī, Beirut: Dār al-Kutub al-ʿIlmiyya, 2013.
- Īqāẓ al-himam fī sharḥ al-ḥikam, ed. Muḥammad Aḥmad Ḥasab Allāh, Cairo: Dār al-Maʿārif, 1983.
- Allah: An explanation of the divine names and attributes (Translator) Abdul Aziz Suraqah ISBN 9780990002673
- Autobiography: Aḥmad Ibn ʿAjība, Fahrasat al-ʿālim al-rabbānī Sayyidī Aḥmad Ibn Muḥammad Ibn ʿAjība al-Ḥasanī, ed. ʿAbd al-Salām al-ʿImrānī al-Khālidī, Beirut: Dār al-Kutub al-ʿIlmiyya, 2013.
  - The Autobiography (Fahrasa) of a Moroccan Soufi: Ahmad ibn 'Ajiba, translated from the Arabic by Jean-Louis Michon and David Streight, Fons Vitae PublishingFons Vitae, Louisville KY USA, 1999 ISBN 1-887752-20-X
  - Jean-Louis Michon: Autobiography of a Moroccan Sufi: Ahmad Ibn 'Ajiba [1747–1809]. 2000; ISBN 1-887752-20-X

== Sources ==
- Michon, Jean-Louis (1973). Le soufi marocain Aḥmad ibn ʻAjība (1746-1809) et son Miʻrāj: glossaire de la mystique musulmane (in French). Vrin. ISBN 978-2-7116-0571-2.
- Florian A.G. Lützen: Sufitum und Theologie bei Aḥmad Ibn ʿAǧība – Eine Studie zur Methode des Religionsbegriffs, Tübingen: Mohr Siebeck, 2020.
- Ḥasan ʿAzzūzī: Al-Shaykh Aḥmad Ibn ʿAjība wa manhajuhū fī al-tafsīr, 2 vols., Rabat: Maṭbaʿat Faḍāla, 2001.
- Mahmut Ay: Ahmed b. Acîbe ve işârî tefsir açisindan „El-Bahru‘l-Medîd“, PhD, University of Marmara, Istanbul, 2010.
- Nūr al-dīn Nās al-Faqīh: Aḥmad Ibn ʿAjība – Shāʿir al-taṣawwuf al-Maġribī, Beirut: Books-Publisher, 2013.

== See also ==
- Abu al-Hasan al-Shadhili
- Muhammad al-Arabi al-Darqawi
- Ibn 'Ata' Allah al-Sakandari
- Ibn al-Banna' al-Marrakushi
- Jean-Louis Michon
- List of Sufis
- List of Ash'aris and Maturidis
