= Mohammed al-Harraq al-Alami =

Sidi Abou Abdallah Mohammed ben Mohammed ben Abdelwahed al-Alami al-Moussaoui al-Harraq (Arabic: محمد الحراق) was a well-known Moroccan Sufi poet and teacher. He was born in 1772 in Chefchaouen and died 25 August 1845 in Tétouan. He was buried in his Zawiya near Bab Almaqabir. Sidi Al-Harraq was a pupil of Muhammad al-Arabi al-Darqawi, whom he met in 1814. He wrote three diwans (collections of poetry).

== Bibliography ==
- Al-sagir et Abdelmagid, Ishkaliyat islah al-fikr al-Sufi fi Al-qarayn (Al-Abbas Ahmed Ibn Muhammad Almahdi Ibn Ajiba et Muhammad Al-Harâq), 1994, édition: Al-Bayda, Dar Al-Afaq, Aljadida, Al-Maghrib
- Muhammad Ibn Muhammad Harrâq, 1992, publication Al-Shabab
- Thèse: Le Soufi Marocain Al-Harraq : la Réforme Soufie au 19é Siècle (incl. the biography of Sidi Muhammad Al Haraq and his diwan containing songs, muwash-shah-style poems, and short poems)
- CD (Misticismo) with poems by Mohammed al-Harraq, sung by Omar Metioui
