= Muhammad Said al-Jamal ar-Rifa'i =

Islamic scholar

Sheikh Muhammad Said al-Jamal ar-Rifa'i
- محمد سعيد الجمل الرفاعي

Personal life
- Born: Muhammad Said Mahmoud Hussein al-Jamal ar-Rifa'i محمد سعيد محمود حسين الجمل الرفاعي; 1935 Tulkarm, West Bank
- Died: 11 November 2015 (aged 79–80) Greenbrae, CA, United States
- Resting place: Tulkarm and Jerusalem
- Citizenship: Palestinian
- Era: 20th century 21st century
- Main interest(s): Aqeedah, Fiqh, Tafsir
- Occupation: Scholar of Islam

Religious life
- Religion: Islam
- Denomination: Sunni

Shaykh Muhammad Sa‘id al-Jamal ar-Rifa‘i ash-Shadhuli (1935 in Tulkarm – 11 November 2015 in Greenbrae) better known as Shaykh Muhammad al-Jamal, was a Palestinian Islamic scholar, Khatib, Imam of Al-Aqsa Mosque, and famous Sufi scholar of the 21st century. He was a teacher at the Al-Aqsa Mosque and Dome of the Rock in Jerusalem. Muhammad Said al-Jamal was a descendant of Ahmad al-Rifaʽi, founder of Rifaʽi Sufi Order.

== Early life ==
Muhammad Sa‘id al-Jamal ar-Rifa‘i ash-Shadhuli was born in 1935 in Tulkarm city in the Holy Land.

== Works ==
Muhammad Said al-Jamal ar-Rifa'i has written more than 40 books in English and Arabic. His books include:

- Music of the Soul: Sufi Teachings, ISBN 978-1-892595-00-3, August 1996.

== Death ==
Muhammad Said al-Jamal ar-Rifa'i died on 11 November 2015 in Greenbrae, CA, he was buried in Jerusalem after Salat al-Janazah for him in Al-Aqsa Mosque.

== See also ==
- Muhammad Rashad al-Sharif
