= Ibn Ata Allah al-Iskandari =

Egyptian Sufi scholar (1259–1310)

Personal life
- Born: 658 AH / 1259 CE
- Died: 709 AH / 1310 CE
- Era: Medieval
- Region: Alexandria

Religious life
- Religion: Islam
- Denomination: Sunni
- Jurisprudence: Maliki
- Tariqa: Shadhili
- Creed: Ashari

'Ibn ʿAṭāʾ Allāh al-Iskandarī, or al-Sakandarī (in full, Tāj al-Dīn Abū'l-Faḍl Aḥmad ibn Muḥammad ibn ʿAbd al-Karīm ibn ʿAbd al-Rahmān ibn ʿAbd Allāh ibn Aḥmad ibn ʿĪsā ibn al-Ḥusayn ibn ʿAṭāʾ Allāh al-Judhāmī al-Iskandarī, Arabic: تاج الدين أبو الفضل أحمد بن محمد بن عبد الكريم بن عبد الرحمن بن عبد الله بن أحمد بن عيسى بن الحسين بن عطاء الله الجذامي السكندري) was an Egyptian Maliki jurist, muhaddith and the third murshid (spiritual "guide" or "master") of the Shadhiliyya Sufi order after his teacher Abu al-Abbas al-Mursi.

== Life ==
He was born in Alexandria and taught at both the al-Azhar Mosque and the Mansuriyyah madrasa in Cairo. He was responsible for systematizing Shadhili doctrines and recording the biographies of the order's founder, Abu al-Hasan al-Shadhili, and his successor, Abu al-Abbas al-Mursi. He is credited with having authored the first systematic treatise on the invocation of God (dhikr), The Key to Salvation (Miftāḥ al-Falāḥ), but he is mostly known for his compilation of aphorisms, al-Ḥikam al-ʿAṭāʾiyya, known as The Book of Wisdom.

Ibn Ata'Allah was born in a family of religious scholars and started his education under The great Maliki jusrists like Abu al-Hasan al-Aybari. Ibn Ata'Allah was a great skeptic of Sufism even though his father had a great attachment to Abu al-Hasan Al-Shadhili. After a stint period as a teacher in Alexandria, he went to Mamluk capital of Cairo and stated teaching Hadith and Jurispudence in Al-Azhar and some of his prominent disciples were Taj al-Din al-Subki and Shihab al-Din al-Qarafi.

His turning point came when he met Abu al-Abbas al-Mursi, the second master of the Shadhili order. In their first conversation,Abu al-Abbas al-Mursi gave him a simple but decisive framework: in blessings, be grateful; in trials, be patient; in obedience, reflect on God’s favor; in disobedience, seek forgiveness. Ibn Ata'Allah al-Iskandari later said this guidance lifted his anxieties “like a garment removed.” From that moment, he became Abu al-Abbas al-Mursi's devoted disciple.

Over twelve years under his Shaykh, he matured into a major Sufi authority, both a jurist and a spiritual guide, respected across Cairo, including by the Mamluk elite. He advised rulers such as Qalawun and became influential in court circles.

His writings consolidated his legacy. Among them are Miftah al-Falah (a manual on dhikr) and his most famous work, Kitab al-Hikam, which marked his full emergence as an independent master. After Abu al-Abbas al-Mursi's death, he became head of the Shadhili order, helping systematize its teachings and preserve the biographies of its founders, including Abu al-Hasan al-Shadhili.

He taught Maliki law publicly while guiding disciples spiritually, influencing scholars, rulers, and common people alike. Even critics recognized his stature, Ibn Taymiyya described him as deeply pious, learned, and sincere, reportedly praising his devotion in a public exchange.

He died in 1309 at age sixty and was buried in Cairo, leaving behind a legacy that shaped the intellectual and spiritual direction of the Shadhili path for generations.

== Kitab al-Hikam ==
Kitab al-Hikam is a short but widely revered Sufi classic, often seen as one of the finest works of Islamic spirituality. It contains around 261 aphorisms, brief, precise reflections on the relationship between the human being and God, written as direct guidance to the spiritual seeker.

Rooted in the Quran and the teachings of the Prophet Muhammad it serves as a practical manual for inner growth. Its aim is clear: to help a person live Islam both outwardly and inwardly, refine character, and move toward true spiritual realization. The work is known for its meditative tone, clarity, and striking style. It was reportedly dictated by Ibn Ata Allah al-Iskandari to his disciple Taqi al-Din al-Subki and later transmitted through figures like Ahmad Zarruq. Over time, it attracted major commentaries from scholars such as Ibn Abbad al-Rundi, Abdullah al-Sharqawi, Ahmad ibn Ajiba, and in modern times Ramadan al-Bouti.

Thematically, it moves from deep reflections on pure monotheism, warning against subtle forms of spiritual distraction, to the purification of character, and finally to the demands of the spiritual path. It also includes four treatises responding to disciples’ questions and concludes with intimate supplications expressing complete surrender to God, some drawn from early Islamic sources, including Hasan ibn Ali. Concise in form but expansive in depth, Hikam endures because it unites rigorous spiritual insight with language that directly engages the seeker.

== Confrontation with Ibn Taymiyya ==
Ibn Ata Allah al-Iskandari was among the prominent scholars who confronted the controversial Hanbali theologian Ibn Taymiyya, who had been imprisoned multiple times for his views on various religious matters, including his severe criticism of Sufism. Their encounters became part of one of the most significant theological debates in Islamic intellectual history, centering around Sufism, the legitimacy of Prophetic intercession (tawassul), and the doctrines of Ibn Arabi.

One of the most notable moments between the two scholars occurred at the Al-Ḥusayn Mosque in Cairo. Ibn Ata Allah was leading the prayer there when Ibn Taymiyya, recently released from prison, joined the congregation and prayed behind him. After the prayer, the two exchanged respectful greetings. Ibn Ata Allah al-Iskandari, in a gesture of humility, apologized if he had played any role in Ibn Taymiyya's imprisonment. Ibn Taymiyya responded with remarkable grace, saying,

"If you know anyone who believes they have hurt me, tell them Ibn Taymiyya holds no grudges. I am not affected by such matters; I only do what I believe to be right."

In their ensuing discussion, they revisited points of deep theological contention, among them, the permissibility and nature of seeking the Prophet's intercession, and the authenticity of the writings attributed to Ibn Arabi. Ibn Ata Allah al-Iskandari argued that many of Ibn Arabi's ideas had been distorted or misrepresented, a view not uncommon among Sufi defenders. Despite their differences, Ibn Taymiyya is reported to have said of his opponent,

"I have never seen anyone who loves God more than Ibn ʿAṭā Allāh. He is among the most truthful people I have ever met."

Their exchange, though rooted in disagreement, remained dignified and sincere, where Ibn Taymiyya acknowledged some points but remained skeptical. This reflects the adab (etiquette) that once governed scholarly debate in the Islamic tradition.

== Works ==
Ibn 'Ata' Allah's works include:

- Kitab al-Hikam (The Book of Wisdom)
- Kitab al-Lata'if fi manaqib Abi l-'Abbas al-Mursi wa Shaykhihi Abi l-Hasan (The Subtle Blessings in the Saintly Lives of Abu l-'Abbas al-Mursi and His Master Abu l-Hassan)
- Miftah al-falah wa misbah al-anwah (The Key of Success and the Lamps of Spirits).
- Kitab al-Tanwir fi isqat al-Tadbir (The Illumination on Abandoning Self-Direction)
- Al-Qasd al-mujarrad fi ma'rifat al-Ism al-Mufrad (The Pure Goal Concerning Knowledge of the Unique Name)
- Taj al-arus al-hawi li-tahdhib an-nufus (The Bride's Crown Containing the Discipline of Souls)
- Unwan at-tawfiq fi adab at-tariq (The Sign of Success Concerning the Discipline of the Path)

== Death and legacy ==
He died in 1309 while in Cairo.

The wide circulation of Ibn ʿAṭā Allāh's written works led to the spread of the Shādhilī order in North Africa, where the order's founder had been rejected in earlier attempts.

Commentaries on the Ḥikam have been made by some of the most famous masters of the Shadhili order, such as Ibn Abbad al-Rundi, Ahmad Zarruq, and Ahmad ibn Ajiba, as well as non-Shadhilis like the Syrian Islamic law Professor Sa'id Ramadan al-Bouti. A modern English translation of Ḥikam by Muhammed Nafih Wafy was published under the title "The Book of Aphorisms" by Islamic Book Trust in Malaysia in 2010.
