= Ahmed Harrak Srifi =

Moroccan academic

Personal life
- Born: Ahmed Harrak Srifi; 19th century Ahl Srif, Morocco
- Died: 1925 Morocco
- Notable works: Collection of biographies of the most prominent Sheiks and Sayyids; The register of the translations and licences of Ahmad El Fassi
- Known for: His expertise in Quranic sciences and Hadith narration
- Occupation: Scholar, Muhaddith

Religious life
- Religion: Islam

Ahmed Harrak Srifi (Arabic: أحمد الحراق السريفي) was a prominent Moroccan scholar from the tribe of Ahl Srif in the north of Morocco.

== The family tree of Ahmed Harrak Srifi ==
His father was Abdelsalam Harrak Srifi son of Taher Al Alami Al Safsafi son of Muhamad son of Ali al Harrak a descendant of Hasan ibn Ali grandson of Muhammad.

As a Muslim theologian, he specialized in the study of the Quran and of Hadith narration with regard to different interesting of the Quran.

== His works ==
- Collection of biographies of the most prominent Sheiks and Sayyids
- The register of the translations and licences of Ahmad El Fassi

== Death ==
Ahmed Harrak Srifi was killed in the Rif war in Morocco in 1925.
