= Ahmad Zarruq =

Moroccan Sufi scholar and saint (1442–1493)

- Title: Muhtasib al-'ulama' wa al-awliya' (Regulator of the Scholars and Saints)

Personal life
- Born: Ahmad ibn Ahmad ibn Muḥammad ibn 'Īsa; 7 June 1442 Tiliwan, Morocco
- Died: 1493 (aged 50–51) Misrata, Libya
- Resting place: Misrata, Libya
- Notable work(s): Qawa’id al-Tasawwuf (The Principles of Sufism), Commentaries on Maliki jurisprudence, Commentary on the Hikam of ibn 'Ata Allah
- Other name: Imam az-Zarrūq ash Shadhili
- Occupation: Jurist, Sufi, Scholar

Religious life
- Religion: Islam
- Denomination: Sunni
- Order: Shadhili
- School: Maliki
- Creed: Ashari

Senior posting
- Influenced by: Muhammad al-Jazuli

Ahmad Zarruq (Arabic: أحمد زروق) also known as Imam az-Zarrūq ash Shadhili (Aḥmad ibn Aḥmad ibn Muḥammad ibn 'Īsa) (1442–1493 CE) was a 15th-century Moroccan Shadhili Sufi, jurist and saint from Fes. He is considered one of the most prominent and accomplished legal, theoretical, and spiritual scholars in Islamic history, and is thought by some to have been the renewer of his time (mujaddid). He was also the first to be given the honorific title "Regulator of the Scholars and Saints" (muhtasib al-'ulama' wa al-awliya'). His shrine is located in Misrata, Libya, however unknown militants exhumed the grave and burnt half the mosque.

== Life ==
Zarruq was born on 7 June 1442 (22nd Muharram, 846 of the Islamic 'Hijra' calendar) – according to Sheikh Abd Allah Gannun – in a village in the region of Tiliwan, a mountain area of Morocco. He was of the Berber tribe of the Barnusi who lived in an area between Fes and Taza, and was orphaned of both his mother and father within the first seven days of his birth. His grandmother, an accomplished jurist, raised him and was his first teacher. Zarruq is one of the most prominent scholars in the late Maliki school but is perhaps better known as a Shadhili Sufi Sheikh and founder of the Zarruqiyye branch of the Shadhili Sufi order (Tariqa). He was a contemporary of Muhammad al-Jazuli.

He took the name 'Zarruq' (meaning 'blue') and he studied the traditional Islamic sciences such as jurisprudence, Arabic, traditions of Prophet Muhammed and wrote extensively on a number of subjects. His most famous works are first of all his Qawa’id al-Tasawwuf (The Principles of Sufism), his commentaries on Maliki jurisprudence and his commentary upon the Hikam of ibn 'Ata Allah. He travelled East to Mecca in Tihamah and to Egypt before taking up residence in Misrata, Libya where he died in 899 (1493). He was buried in Misrata, Libya.

== Quotes ==
- This world is like the river of Goliath from which no one who drinks is saved except the one who scoops up a handful, not the one who slakes his thirst.

== See also ==
- Wazifa Zarruqiyya
- List of Ash'aris and Maturidis

== Bibliography ==
- Scott Alan Kugle, Rebel Between Spirit And Law: Ahmad Zarruq, Sainthood, And Authority in Islam, Indiana University Press, 2006, ISBN 978-0-253-34711-4
- Ali Fahmi Khashim, Zarruq, the Sufi: A guide in the way and a leader to the truth : a biographical and critical study of a mystic from North Africa
- Al-Houdalieh, Salah Hussein (2010). "Visitation and Making Vows at the Shrine of Shaykh Shihab Al-Din". Journal of Islamic Studies. 21 (3): 377–390. doi:10.1093/JIS/ETQ055.
