= Vyacheslav Polosin =

Russian Muslim academic (born 1956)

Ali Vyacheslav Polosin
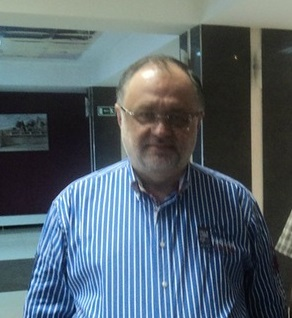
- Vyaçeslav Polosin in 2014
- Born: Вячеслав Сергеевич Полосин (Vyacheslav Sergeevich Polosin); June 26, 1956 (age 70); Moscow, Russia
- Citizenship: Russia, Moscow
- Occupation: scholar
- Known for: Expert on Muslim-Christian Dialogue
- Website: http://www.islam.ru

Ali Vyacheslav Polosin (Russian: Али Вячеслав Полосин) is a Russian Muslim academic who converted to Islam in 1999. He is a former priest of the Russian Orthodox Church.

== Biography ==
He was born in 1956 in Moscow, Russia. Studied Philosophy at Moscow State University.

- 1983-1991 served as priest in Russian Orthodox Church.
- 1990-1993 served as Member of Russia's Parliament.

Polosin is an Islamic scholar and an expert on interfaith dialogue and Muslim-Christian relations who is currently Director of Moscow-based Al Wasatiya Center for interfaith dialogue.

== Publications ==
Books and articles written by Polosin have been translated into many languages.

- Secular State and Islamic Tradition in Russia
- Criminal sectarianism will never become the norm of life
