= Darqawiyya =

Sufi mystic order in Sunni Islam

The Darqawiyya or Darqawi Sufi order is a revivalist branch of the Shadhiliyah brotherhood which originated in Morocco. The Darqawa comprised the followers of Sheikh Muhammad al-Arabi al-Darqawi (1760–1823) of Morocco. The movement, which became one of the leading Sufi orders (tariqa) in Morocco, exalted poverty and asceticism. It gained widespread support among the rural populations and the urban lower classes. Its popularity was increased by its use of musical instruments in its rituals. In both Morocco and Algeria, the Darqawiyya were involved in political activities and protest movements.

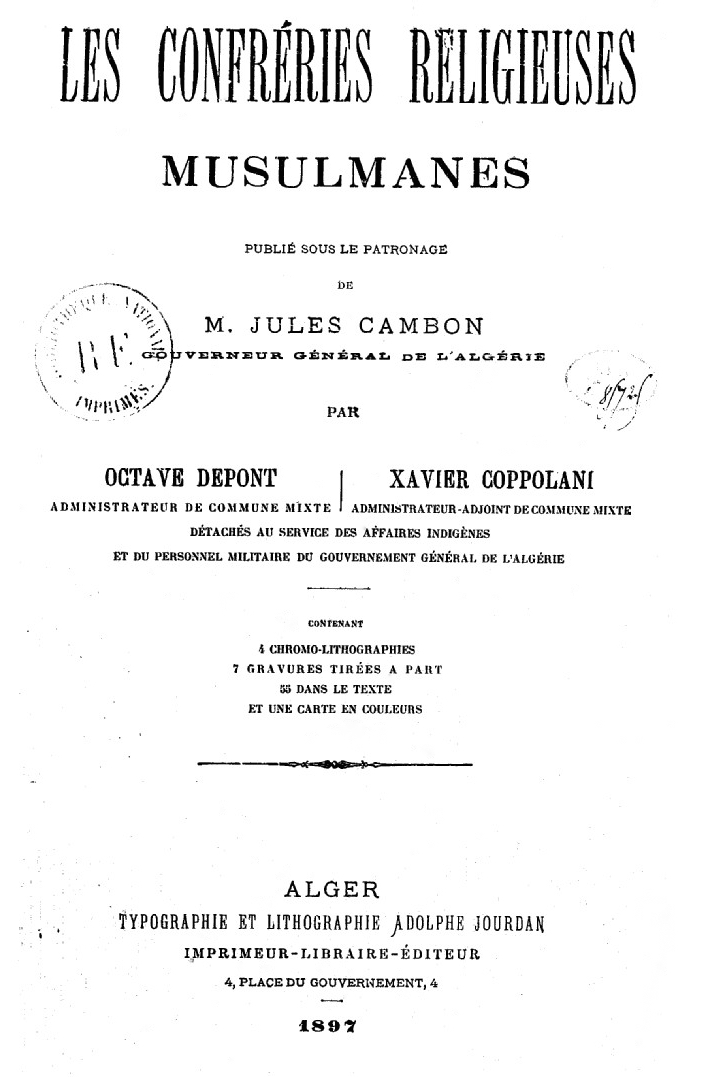
Confreries (1897)

It has received little attention from Orientalists compared to other Sufi orders, despite its closeness to Europe and relatively recent history. The few authors who did write about the Darqawiyya were largely guided by administrative concerns. In their book, Confreries (1897), Depont and Coppolani call them "ferocious sectarians," and "puritans of Islam" (p. 504-5). These judgments were echoed by Edmond Doutté in L'Islam algerien en 1900, "The Darqawa are thus mendicant dervishes. It is a dangerous order, one found in almost all the insurrections that have taken place against governments". In Morocco the vitality of the Darqawa has remained so strong that it has been said that "the 19th century was the Darqawi century, just as the 18th century had been the Nasiri century." During the same period, the order burgeoned in Sri Lanka, Libya, Egypt, Palestine, Syria and Lebanon.

Incidents in Constantine, Algeria led to the killing of Saleh Bey in 1792, a prominent administrative figure in the beylik, popular with the population. Algiers lost a politician and a seasoned military and administrative leader. At the start of the 19th century, intrigues by the Moroccan court in Fez inspired the Zawiyas to stir up unrest and revolt. Where Muhammad ibn Al-Ahrash, a marabout from Morocco and leader of the Darqawiyyah Shadhili religious order, led the revolution in the Constantine region and controlled Jijel, Al-Qal and Al-Qala. Abdullah Al-Zabushi, the leader of the Rahmani order, helped him and sought to occupy the city of Constantine, the capital of the beylik. Its activity extended to Chelif. At a time when ibn Al-Ahrash was making his move in the east, the Darqawis in western Algeria joined the revolt and besieged Tlemcen, Sharif Darqawi led another rebellion, and even the Tijanis in Ain Madhi revolted against Ottoman rule, but were eventually defeated by the bey Osmane, who in turn was killed by Dey Hadj Ali.

Between 1803 and 1805, al-Darqāwī played a key role in the rebellion in western Algeria, entangled in a conflict between the Turkish Bey in Oran and the fuqara in Tlemcen. Rooted in economic issues, the rebellion unfolded with Ibn al-Sharif, the Darqāwī leader, catalyzing a separation from Turkish rule. Al-Darqāwī, influential in the Darqāwī order, led a delegation to the Moroccan Sultan, pledging allegiance. As Tlemcen proclaimed its allegiance to the Moroccan Sultan, initial acceptance by the Sultan gave way to prolonged hostilities. Seeking a diplomatic solution, which al-Darqāwī opposed, the Sultan aimed for resolution while al-Darqāwī advocated for the continued struggle against the Turks.

== See also ==
- Mohammed al-Harraq al-Alami
- Ahmad al-Alawi
- Ahmad ibn 'Ajiba
- Muhammad ibn al-Habib
