= Aisha Abdurrahman Bewley =

American writer and translator

Aisha Abdurrahman Bewley (born 1948) is a Muslim author and translator of many classical Islamic books. The WorldCat union catalog lists her as author or translator for "73 works in 172 publications in 3 languages and 855 library holdings". She and her husband accepted Islam very early on and now have collaborated on an English translation of the Qur'an.

== Life ==
She was born in 1948 in the United States, received a BA in French and an MA in Near Eastern Languages from the University of California, Berkeley and attended the American University in Cairo on a fellowship. She converted to Islam in 1968. She is married to Shaykh Abdalhaqq Bewley, who is often co-translator of her books, and is the father of her three children.

== Selected works ==
=== Translations ===
- (tr.) The Darqawi Way: Letters of Mawlay al-Darqawi by Muhammad al-Arabi al-Darqawi. Norwich: Diwan Press, 1981.
- (tr.) Al-Muwatta of Imam Malik ibn Anas: The First Formulation of Islamic Law by Malik ibn Anas. London & New York: Kegan Paul International, 1989.
- (tr. with Abdalhaqq Bewley) The noble Qurʼan: a new rendering of its meaning in English. Norwich: Diwan Press, 1999.
- The Madinan Way: the soundness of the basic premises of the School of the People of Madina by Ibn Taymiyyah. 2000.
- (tr.) Ibn al-Arabi on the mysteries of bearing witness to the oneness of God and prophethood of Muhammad by Ibn Arabi. 2002.
- (tr.) Tafsir al-Qurtubi: classical commentary of the Holy Qurʼan by Al-Qurtubi. 2003.

=== Other works ===
- (with Abdalhaqq Bewley and Ahmad Thomson) The Islamic will: a practical guide to being prepared for death and writing your will according to the Shariʻa of Islam and English law. London : Dar Al Taqwa, 1995.
- A glossary of Islamic terms. 1998.
- Islam: the empowering of women. 1999.
- Muslim women: a biographical dictionary. 2004.
