= Mohammed al-Tawudi ibn Suda =

Moroccan Maliki scholar

Personal life
- Born: 1700 Fez, Morocco
- Died: 1795 (aged 94–95)
- Main interest(s): Islamic jurisprudence, Hadith, Sufism
- Notable work: Commentary on Sahih al-Bukhari
- Education: Al-Azhar University
- Occupation: Scholar, Mufti, Shaykh al-Jamaa

Religious life
- Religion: Islam
- Denomination: Sunni
- Creed: Maliki

Senior posting
- Influenced by: Mohammed ibn Abdel Karim al-Samman, Mohammed Murtada al-Zabidi
- Influenced: Ahmed ibn Idris

Mohammed ibn al-Talib al-Tawudi ibn Suda (Arabic: مُحَمَّد بْنُ الطَّالب التَّاوْدِي بن سُودَة, romanized: Muḥammad ibn al-Ṭālib al-Tāwūdī ibn Sūda; 1700–1795) was one of the most influential scholars of the 18th century in Morocco, both politically and intellectually. He is described by the Egyptian historian, Al-Jabarti, as the "crescent of the Maghrib". He went on the hajj in 1767-1768 and studied in Medina with Mohammed ibn Abdel Karim al-Samman (1718–1775), founder of the Sammaniyya branch of the Khalwatiyya and in Cairo with the Indian scholar Mohammed Murtada al-Zabidi (d. 1791). In Cairo he also taught the Muwatta of Malik ibn Anas at the Al-Azhar. Ibn Suda was appointed by the sultan in 1788 to reform the curriculum at the Qarawiyin University of Fez, where he was installed as mufti and shaykh al-jamaa. Ibn Suda is also well known as the author of a commentary on Sahih al-Bukhari and as the teacher of Ahmed ibn Idris.

== See also ==
- Zawiya of Sidi Taoudi Ben Souda
