= Ibn Abbad al-Rundi =

14th-century Sufi theologian

- ابن عباد الرندي

Personal life
- Born: 1333 Ronda, Spain
- Died: 1390 (aged 56–57) Fes, Morocco
- Resting place: Bab al-Futuh cemetery, Fes
- Notable work: Letters on the Sufi Path
- Occupation: Sufi theologian, writer

Religious life
- Religion: Islam
- Arabic name
- Personal (Ism): Muḥammad
- Patronymic (Nasab): ibn Abī Isḥāq Ibrāhīm
- Teknonymic (Kunya): Abū ʿAbdallāh
- Toponymic (Nisba): al-Nafzī al-Ḥimyarī al-Rundī

Ibn ʿAbbād al-Rundī (Arabic: ابن عباد الرندي; (Note: Full name Abū ʿAbdallāh Muḥammad b. Abī Isḥāq Ibrāhīm al-Nafzī al-Ḥimyarī al-Rundī) 1333–1390) was one of the leading Sufi theologians of his time who was born in Ronda. Attracted to Morocco by the famous madrasahs, Ibn Abbad emigrated there at an early age. He spent most of his life in Morocco, living in different cities (Salé, Marrakesh, Fes...), and was buried in Bab al-Futuh (south-eastern gate) cemetery in Fes.

Ibn Abbad has been suggested as a possible influence on St. John of the Cross in the work of Miguel Asín Palacios.

== Sources ==
- Ibn Abbad of Ronda: Letters on the Sufi Path, transl. John Renard (New York 1986) Archived 2008-03-04 at the Wayback Machine ISBN 0-8091-2730-X
- Los Más Hermosos Nombres de Dios. Versión aljamiada de la plegaria mística escrita por Ibn `Abbâd de Ronda (s.XIV), ed. Xavier Casassas Canals Archived 2010-11-08 at the Wayback Machine
- "Saint-Jean de la Croix, Ibn ‘Abbâd de Ronda et la survivance en Espagne de la mystique musulmane en langue castillane jusqu’à la fin du XVIe siècle", a Horizons Maghrébins. L'héritage de l'Espagne des trois cultures, n° 61 (2010), pp.63-69, from Xavier Casassas Canals.
- Ibn ‘Abbâd, modéle de la Shâdhiliyya a (La Shâdhiliyya -- Une voie soufie dans le monde, éd. E. Geoffroy, Paris: Maisonneuve & Larose, 2004.), from Dr. Kenneth L. Honerkamp.
