= Muhammad al-Arabi al-Darqawi =

Moroccan Sufi leader (1760–1823)

Abu Abdullah Muhammad al-Arabi al-Darqawi (Arabic: محمد العربي الدرقاوي; 1760–1823) was a Moroccan Sufi leader of the Shadhili tariqa and the author of letters concerning the dhikr he preached and instructions for daily life. He stressed noninvolvement in worldly affairs (Dunya) and spoke against other Sufi orders exploiting claims of barakah (blessings). He was imprisoned by the Moroccan ruler Mulay Slimane (r. 1792–1822) for supporting revolts against the throne, but was released by Abderrahmane (r. 1822–1859).

A branch of the Shadhili order, the Darqawa, was organized around his teachings after his death, with members coming from a wide range of social groups. Though the Darqawa was once the most important tariqah in Morocco, its power waned as it spread throughout North Africa. His tomb is in the Zawiya Bou Brih also in the Rif.

== His Letters ==
Almost all of the letters concern the method based on the central techniques of invocation or dhikr, not usually discussed openly by Sufi masters. The letters were compiled by al-`Arabi al-Darqawi himself, copied by his disciples and printed many times in Fez, in lithographed script. Titus Burckhardt has made this translation on the basis of two nineteenth-century manuscripts as well as the lithographed edition.

== See also ==
- Ahmad ibn Ajiba
- Muhammad Abul-Huda al-Yaqoubi
