= List of writers by name: A =

The following is a List of writers by name whose last names begin with A:

Abbreviations: ch = children's; d = drama, screenwriting; f = fiction; nf = non-fiction; p = poetry, song lyrics

== Aa–Ad ==
- Andreas Leigh Aabel (1830–1901, Norway, p)
- Hauk Aabel (1869–1961, Norway, nf)
- Asger Aaboe (1922–2007, Denmark, nf)
- Hans Günther Aach (1919–1999, Germany, nf)
- Thorvald Aadahl (1882–1962, Norway, f)
- Bertus Aafjes (1914–1993, Netherlands, p)
- Gustav Aagaard (1852–1927, Norway, nf/p)
- Johannes Aagaard (1928–2007, Norway, nf/p)
- Oscar Aagaard (1855–1936, Norway, f/nf)
- Fritz Aagesen (1935–1998, Norway, f)
- David Aaker (born 1938, US, nf)
- Patricia Aakhus (1952–2012, US, f)
- Jeppe Aakjær (1866–1930, Denmark, f/p)
- G. Ch. Aalders (1880–1961, England/Netherlands, nf)
- Jamiluddin Aali (1925–2015, Pakistan, nf/p)
- Anathon Aall (1867–1943, Norway, nf)
- Anna-Kaarina Aalto (1920–1994, Finland, nf)
- Marja-Sisko Aalto (19–1994, Finland, nf)
- Pentti Aalto (born 1954, Finland, f)
- Bjørn Aamodt (1944–2006, Norway, p)
- Jane Aamund (1936–2019, Denmark, f)
- Jorunn Aanderaa (1934–2025, Norway, p)
- Hans Aanrud (1863–1953, Norway, d/p/f)
- Bizhan Aarabi (born 1947, Iran/US, nf)
- Frank Aarebrot (1947–2017, Norway, nf)
- Emil Aarestrup (1800–1856, Denmark, p)
- Verna Aardema (1911–2000, US, ch)
- Gerard van den Aardweg (born 1936, Netherlands, nf)
- Fredrik Aarnseth (1872–1925, Sweden, nf)
- Chester Aaron (1922–2019, US, f)
- Daniel Aaron (1912–2016, US, nf)
- David Aaron (born 1938, US, nf)
- Henry J. Aaron (born 1936, US, nf)
- Jane Aaron (born 1951, Wales/Australia, nf)
- Jonathan Aaron (born 1941, US, p)
- Rachel Aaron (born c. 1982), US, f)
- Richard Aaron (1901–1987, Wales, nf)
- Soazig Aaron (born 1949, France, f)
- Teodor Aaron (1803–1867, Romania, nf)
- Edward S. Aarons (1916–1975, US, f)
- Eric Aarons (1919–2019, Australia, nf)
- Leroy F. Aarons (1933–2004, US, nf)
- Mark Aarons (born 1951, Australia, nf)
- Aaron Aaronsohn (1876–1919, Romania/Palestine, nf)
- Alexander Aaronsohn (1888–1948, Palestine/France, nf)
- Lazarus Aaronson (1894–1966, England, p)
- Susan Ariel Aaronson (living, US, nf)
- Ben Aaronovitch (born 1964, England, d/f)
- David Aaronovitch (born 1954, England, nf)
- Sam Aaronovitch (1919–1998, England, nf)
- Sophus Aars (1841–1931, Norway, f)
- Asbjørn Aarseth (1935–2009, Norway, nf)
- Hans Aarsleff (1925–2026, Denmark, nf)
- Hans Aarsman (born 1951, Netherlands, f/nf)
- Kjell Aartun (1925-2023, Norway, nf)
- Aarudra (1925–1998, India, nf/p)
- Egil Aarvik (1912–1990, Norway, nf)
- Aarudhra (1925–1998, India, p/d)
- Ivar Aasen (1813–1896, Norway, d/p/nf)
- Anne Aaserud (1942–2017, Norway, nf)
- Johan Arnd Aasgaard (1876–1966, US, nf)
- Karin Aasma (1926–2012, Estonia/Finland, nf)
- Acharya Aatreya (1921–1989, India, p)
- Aleksanteri Aava (1883–1956, Finland, p)
- Gholamreza Aavani (born 1943, Iran, nf)
- Muzaffar Aazim (1934–2022, India/US, p)
- Amjad Ali Aazmi (1882–1948, India, nf)
- Arthur A'Beckett (1812–1871, England/Australia, f)
- Dafydd ab Hugh (1960–2026, US, f)
- Aziz Ab'Sáber (1924–2012, Brazil, nf)
- Noureddine Aba (1921–1996, Algeria/France, nf)
- Antonio Abad (1894–1970, Philippines, p/f/nf)
- Anton Abad Chavarria (born 1958, Spain, p)
- Diego Abad de Santillán (1896–1983, Spain/Argentina, nf)
- Gémino Abad (born 1939, Philippines, f/nf/p)
- Mar Abad (born 1972, Spain, nf)
- Mercedes Abad (born 1961, Spain, f)
- Lucas Abadamloora (1938-2009, Ghana, nf)
- Kalikananda Abadhut (1910–1978, India, f)
- Yitzchak Abadi (1933–2025, Venezuela/US, nf)
- Guillermo Abadía Morales (1912–2010, Colombia, nf)
- Ann J. Abadie (1938–2024, US, nf)
- Alejandro G. Abadilla (1906–1969, Philippines, f/nf/p)
- Gjorgji Abadžiev (1910–1963, Ottoman E/Yugoslavia, f/nf)
- Nikolai Abaev (1949–2020, Tuvan SSR/Russia, nf)
- Frank Abagnale (born 1948, US/France, nf)
- Gevorg Abajian (1920–2002, Armenia, f/nf)
- Yunus Nadi Abalıoğlu (1879–1945, Ottoman E/Turkey, nf)
- Ahmet Abakay (born 1950, Turkey, nf)
- Iñaki Ábalos (born 1956, Spain, nf)
- Rafael Ábalos (born 1956, Spain, ch)
- Richard Abanes (born 1961, US, nf)
- Chris Abani (born 1966, Nigeria/US, f/p)
- Saber Abar (born 1984, Iran, d/f)
- Jacob Ralph Abarbanell (1852–1922, US, f)
- Hiram Abas (1932–1990, Turkey, nf)
- Naty Abascal (born 1943, Spain, nf)
- Alexander Abasheli (1884–1954, Georgia/USSR, p/f)
- Grigol Abashidze (1914–1994, Georgia/USSR, f/p)
- Irakli Abashidze (1909–1992, Georgia/USSR, p/nf)
- Makbule Abasıyanık (1883–1963, Turkey, f)
- Sait Faik Abasıyanık (1906–1954, Turkey, f/p)
- Ines Abassi (born 1982, Tunisia, p/nf)
- Carmine Abate (born 1954, Italy, f/nf)
- Joaquín Abati (1865–1936, Spain, d/f/nd)
- Atia Abawi (born 1982, US, f)
- Anne Abayasekara (1925–2015, Sri Lanka, nf)
- John Augustus Abayomi-Cole (1848–1943, Sierra Leone/US, nf)
- Fekry Abaza (1896–1979, Egypt, nf)
- Tharwat Abaza (1927–2002, Egypt, f/nf)
- Giuseppe Cesare Abba (1838–1910, Italy, nf)
- Afira bint 'Abbad (3rd c. CE, Arab region, p)
- Abdul-Muhsin al-Abbad (born 1934, Saudi Arabia, nf)
- Buthaina bint al-Mu'tamid ibn Abbad (born 1070, Andalusia, p)
- Emanuela Abbadessa (born 1964, Italy, f)
- Mostafa El-Abbadi (1928-2017, Egypt, nf)
- Luis G. Abbadie (born 1968, Mexico, f)
- Kate Abbam (1934-2016, Ghana, f/nf)
- Mo Abbaro (1932-2016, Sudan/England, nf)
- Abbas (1944–2018, Iran, nf)
- Ackbar Abbas (1942–2026, Hong Kong/China, nf)
- Agil Abbas (born 1953, Azerbaijan, f)
- Ferhat Abbas (1899–1985, Algeria, nf)
- Fatin Abbas (living, Sudan, nf)
- Ghulam Abbas (1909–1982, Pakistan, p)
- Ihsan Abbas (1920–2003, Palestine/Jordan, nf)
- Hassan Abbas (born 1969, Pakistan, f)
- Jaafar Abbas (living, Sudan, nf)
- Khwaja Ahmad Abbas (1914–1987, India, f/nf)
- Mahmoud Abbas (born 1935, Palestine, nf)
- Rahman Abbas (born 1972, India, f)
- Raouf Abbas (1939-2008, Egypt, nf)
- Rasha Abbas (born 1984, Syria, f)
- Soltan Abbas (1933-2025, Azerbaijan, p)
- Wasiullah Abbas (born 1948, India, nf)
- Ashraf Abbasi (1925-2014, Pakistan, nf)
- Heydar Abbasi (1943-2026, Iran, p)
- Neelofar Abbasi (born 1955, Pakistan, nf)
- Tanveer Abbasi (1934-1999, Pakistan, p)
- Israfil Abbaslı (1938-2013, Azerbaijan, nf)
- Mahdi Abbaszadeh (living, Iran, nf)
- Carolyn Abbate (born 1956, US, nf)
- Florencia Abbate (born 1976, Argentina, f/nf)
- George Abbe (1911–1989, US, f/nf/p)
- Kathryn Abbe (1919–2014, US, nf)
- Patience Abbe (1924–2012, France, f)
- Michael Abbensetts (1938–2016, Guyana/England, f)
- Christina Abbey (1924–2022, England, f), pseudonym of Nancy Buckingham and John Sawyer
- Edward Abbey (1927–1989, US, nf/f)
- Henry Abbey (1842–1911, US, p)
- Lynn Abbey (born 1948, US, f)
- Richard Abbey (1805–1891, US, nf)
- Anvita Abbi (born 1949, India, nf)
- Andrew Arthur Abbie (1905–1976, Australia, nf)
- Mehrinoz Abbosova (born 1995, US, f)
- Alice Balch Abbot (1867–1937, US, f)
- Ezra Abbot (1819–1884, US, nf)
- Francis Ellingwood Abbot (1836–1903, US, nf)
- Ian Abbot (1947–1989, Scotland, p)
- Laura Abbot (living, US, f)
- Richard Abbot (born 1818–1904, England, p)
- William Wright Abbot (1922–2009, US, nf)
- Willis J. Abbot (1863–1934, US, nf)
- Almon Abbott (1881–1945, Canada/US, nf)
- Andrew Abbott (born 1948, US, nf)
- Austin Abbott (1831–1896, US, f/nf)
- Belle Kendrick Abbott (1842–1893, US, f)
- Benjamin Vaughan Abbott (1830–1890, US, f/nf)
- Carl Abbott (born 1944, US, nf)
- Carlisle S. Abbott (1828–1919, US, nf)
- Charles Conrad Abbott (1843–1919, US, nf)
- Chris Abbott (born 1949, US, nf)
- Claude Colleer Abbott (1889–1971, England, p)
- David Abbott (1863–1934, US, nf)
- David Abbott (1938–2014, US, f)
- Diane Abbott (born 1953, England, nf)
- Edith Abbott (1876–1957, US, nf)
- Edward Abbott (1801–1869, Australia, nf)
- Edward Abbott (1841–1908, US, f/nf)
- Edwin Abbott Abbott (1838–1926, England, nf/f)
- Edwin Milton Abbott (1877–1940, US, nf)
- Eleanor Hallowell Abbott (1872–1958, US, f/p)
- Elizabeth Abbott (born 1946, Canada, nf)
- Eric Abbott (1906–1983), England, nf)
- Evelyn Abbott (1843–1901, England, nf)
- Frank Frost Abbott (1860–1924, US, nf)
- George Frederick Abbott (1874–1947, England, nf)
- Gorham Dummer Abbott (1807–1874, US, nf)
- Hailey Abbott (living, US, f)
- H. H. Abbott (1891–1976, England, p)
- Isabella Abbott (1919–2010, US, p)
- J. H. M. Abbott (1874–1953, Australia, f/p)
- Jack Henry Abbott (1944–2002, US, nf)
- Jacob Abbott (1803–1879, US, ch)
- Jane Abbott (1881–1962, US, ch/f)
- Jeff Abbott (born 1963, US, f)
- John S. C. Abbott (1805–1877, US, nf)
- Abbott Kahler (born 1973, US, f/nf)
- Lee K. Abbott (1947–2019, US, f)
- Leonard Abbott (1878–1953, US, nf)
- Louise Abbott (born 1950, Canada, nf)
- Lyman Abbott (1835–1922, US, nf)
- Megan Abbott (born 1971, US, f)
- Nabia Abbott (1897–1981, US, nf)
- Pamela Abbott (born 1947, England, nf)
- Percy Abbott (1886–1960, Australia, nf)
- Philip Abbott (1944–2019, US, nf)
- Rachel Abbott (born 1952, England, f)
- Raymond Abbott (born 1942, US, f)
- R. Tucker Abbott (1919–1995, US, nf)
- Robert Abbott (1933–2018, US, nf)
- Shirley Abbott (1934-2019, US, nf)
- Sidney Abbott (1937-2015, US, nf)
- Steve Abbott (born 1956, Australia, f/nf)
- Thomas Kingsmill Abbott (1828–1913, Ireland, nf)
- Tony Abbott (born 1952, US, ch)
- Wilbur Cortez Abbott (1869–1947, US, nf)
- Wilhelmina Hay Abbott (1884–1957, Scotland, nf)
- Hanna Abboud (born 1937, Syria/Homs Governate, nf)
- Joseph Abboud (born 1950, US, nf)
- Maroun Abboud (1886–1962, Lebanon, f/p)
- Annabel Abbs (born 1964, England, f)
- John Abbs (1810–1880, England/India, nf)
- Peter Abbs (1942–2020, England, nf/p)
- Thomas Abbt (1738–1766, Germany, nf)
- Lutis Abd Al Karim (living, Egypt, f/nf)
- Nuha Hamd Abd Al Karim (living, Egypt, nf)
- Fatih Abd Al Salam (living, Iraq, f)
- Omar Abd al-Kafi (born 1951, Egypt, f/nf)
- Umar Faruq Abd-Allah (born 1948, US, nf)
- Abd el-Krim (1882–1963, Morocco/Egypt, nf)
- Abd al-Qadir al-Fasi (1599–1680, Morocco, nf)
- Benjamin Abdala Júnior (born 1943, Brazil, f)
- Abdilatif Abdalla (born 1946, Kenya, p/nf)
- Ibtisam Abdallah (1940s–2023, Iraq, f)
- Mohammed ben Abdallah (1944–2025, Gold Coast/Ghana, d)
- Mohammad Najib Abdallah (born 1974, Egypt, f)
- Sufi Abdallah (1925–2003, Egypt, f)
- Mohammed Abdalbari (born 1985, Sudan, p)
- Ghada Abdel Aal (born 1978, Egypt, nf)
- Safa Abdel Al Moneim (born 1960, Egypt, f)
- Basma Abdel Aziz (born 1976, Egypt, f/nf)
- Yasir Abdel Baqi (born 1972, Yemen, f)
- Samir Abdel Fattah (born 1972, Yemen, f)
- Mohamed Ali Abdel Jalil (born 1973, Syria, nf)
- Ibrahim Abdel Meguid (born 1946, Egypt, f)
- Mohammed Abdel Nabi (born 1977, Egypt, f)
- Randa Abdel-Fattah (born 1979, Australia, f/nf)
- Ahmed Rashad Abdel-khalik (living, US, nf)
- Yassmin Abdel-Magied (born 1991, England, nf)
- Anouar Abdel-Malek (1924-2012, Egypt/France, nf)
- Muddathir Abdel-Rahim (born 1932, Sudan/England, nf)
- Hamed Abdel-Samad (born 1972, Germany, nf)
- Lesley Abdela (born 1945, England, nf)
- Rawi Abdelal (living, US, nf)
- Tariq Abdelhaleem (born 1948, Egypt/US, nf)
- Senan Abdelqader (born 1962, Israel, nf)
- Layla AbdelRahim (living, US, nf)
- Duaa Abdelrahman (born 1979, Egypt, f)
- Amira Abdelrasoul (living, Canada, nf)
- Azmy Abdelwahab (living, Egypt, p)
- Taha Abderrahmane (born 1944, Morocco, nf)
- Ali A. Abdi (born 1955, Canada, nf)
- Abdi Sheik Abdi (born 1942, Somalia, f/nf)
- Mohammad Abdi (born 1974, Iran, nf)
- Geneive Abdo (born 1960, US, nf)
- Kader Abdolah (born 1954, Iran/Netherlands, f)
- Bijan Abdolkarimi (born 1963, Iran, f)
- Mohammad Javad Abdolmohammadi (born 1950, Iran/US, nf)
- Ali Akbar Abdolrashidi (born 1949, Iran, nf)
- Ali Abdolrezaei (born 1969, Iran/England, p/nf)
- Angela Abdou (born 1969, Canada, f/nf)
- Mohamed Abdou (living, Egypt/Canada, nf)
- Hamid Barole Abdu (born 1953, Eritrea, nf)
- Muhammad Abduh (1849–1905, Egypt, nf)
- ʻAbdu'l-Bahá (1844–1921, Persia/Palestine, nf)
- Samig Abdukakhkhar (born 1990, Soviet Union/Uzbekistan, f)
- Khudair Abdul Amir (born 1934, Iraq, f)
- Muhammad Abdul Bari (born 1953, Bangladesh/England, nf)
- Zain Abdul Hady (born 1956, Egypt, f)
- Najat Abdul Samad (born 1967, Syria, f/p)
- Ghaith Abdul-Ahad (born 1975, Iraq/England, nf)
- Mohammed Abdul-Hayy (1944–1989, Sudan, p/f/nf)
- Luay Abdul-Ilah (born 1949, Iraq/England, f)
- Fayeq Abdul-Jaleel (1948-1991, Kuwait, p)
- Hussein Abdul-Raof (living, Saudi Arabia, nf)
- Mohammad Abdul-Wali (1939-1973, Ethiopia/Yemen, f)
- Bahira Abdulatif (living, Iraq, f)
- Ramazan Abdulatipov (born 1946, Russia, nf)
- Rabab Abdulhadi (born 1955, Palestine/US, nf)
- Fatima Abdulhamid (born 1982, Saudi Arabia, f)
- Mansur Abdulin (1922–2007, Soviet Union/Russia, f)
- Najm Abdulkarim (born 1938, Kuwait, nf)
- Ian Abdulla (1947–2011, Australia, nf)
- Muhammed Said Abdulla (1918–1991, Tanzania, f)
- Sobir Abdulla (1905–1972, Uzbek SSR, f/p)
- Abdul Jabbar Abdullah (1911–1969, Iraq/US, nf)
- Abdulatif Ould Abdullah (born 1988, Algeria, f)
- Achmed Abdullah (1881, Afghanistan/US, f)
- Chelsea Abdullah (living, Kuwait/US, f)
- Daud Abdullah (born 1955, England, nf)
- Fatma Abdullah (born 1975, UAE, f)
- Hazair Abdullah (1953-2026, Brunei, nf)
- Ismail Sabri Abdullah (1924-2006, Egypt, nf)
- Kia Abdullah (born 1982, England, f/nf)
- Laila Abdullah (born 1982, Oman, f/nf/p)
- Mena Kasmiri Abdullah (born 1930, Australia, f)
- Shaila Abdullah (born 1971, Pakistan/US, f)
- Sharif Abdullah (born 1951, US, nf)
- Sophie Abdullah (1925-2003, Egypt, f/nf)
- T. K. Abdullah (1929-2021, India, nf)
- Yahya Taher Abdullah (1938–1981, Egypt, f)
- Ziad Abdullah (born 1975, Syria, f/p)
- Bolaji Abdullahi (born 1969, Nigeria, f/nf)
- Dadasare Abdullahi (1918–1984, Nigeria, nf)
- Mohamed Diriye Abdullahi (born 1958, Somalia/Canada, nf)
- Rovshan Abdullaoglu (born 1978, Azerbaijan, f/nf)
- Chingiz Abdullayev (born 1959, Azerbaijan, f)
- Pulat Abdullayev (born 1942, Russia, nf)
- Raʼno Abdullayeva (1935-2025, Azerbaijan, nf)
- Intissar Abdulmomen (living, Egypt, f)
- Malkhaz Abdushelishvili (1926-1998, Georgia, nf)
- Hafsat Abdulwaheed (born 1952, Nigeria, f)
- Muyesser Abdul'ehed (living, China/Turkey, p)
- O. Abdurahman (born 1944, India, nf)
- C. T. Abdurahim (living, India, nf)
- Hanif Abdurraqib (born 1983, US, nf/p)
- John Thomas Abdy (1822–1899, England, nf)
- Richard Abdy (born 1970, UK, nf)
- Subayilda Abdykadyrova (1935-2010, Kyrgyzstan, p)
- Abe Akira (阿部昭, 1934–1989, Japan, f/nf)
- George Abe (安部直也, 1937–2019, Japan, f)
- Abe Isoo (安部磯雄, 1865–1949, Japan, nf)
- Abe Kazushige (阿部和重, born 1968, Japan, f)
- Abe Kōbō (安部公房, 1924–1993, Japan, f)
- Abe Masao (阿部正雄, 1915–2006, Japan, nf)
- Abe no Nakamaro (阿倍仲麻呂, c. 698 – c. 770, Japan, nf/p)
- Rebecca Abe (born 1967, Germany, f)
- Ryuichi Abe (born 1954, Japan, nf)
- Shana Abé (living, US, f)
- Stanley K. Abe (living, US, nf)
- Abe Tomoji (阿部知二, 1903–1973, Japan, f/nf)
- Abe Yasurō (阿部泰郎, born 1953, Japan, nf)
- Jakes Abeberry (1930–2022, France, nf)
- Éliette Abécassis (born 1969, Morocco/France, nf)
- Maria do Carmo Abecassis (living, Mozambique, p)
- Valentín Abecia Baldivieso (1925-2010, Bolivia, nf)
- Nazek Abu Alwan Abed (1937-2022, Lebanon, nf)
- Colet Abedi (living, US, f/nf/ch)
- Isabel Abedi (born 1967, Germany, f)
- Rashida Abedi (1951-2017, Pakistan/England, nf)
- Razi Abedi (living, Pakistan, f)
- Taqi Abedi (born 1952, India/Canada, p)
- Huma Abedin (born 1975, US, nf)
- Kazi Zainul Abedin (1892–1962, US, nf/p)
- Steve Abee (living, US, f)
- David Abeel (1804–846, US, nf)
- Gustavus Abeel (1801–1887, US, nf)
- Severin Cecile Abega (1955-2008, Cameroon, nf)
- Jimmy Abegg (born 1954, US, p)
- Richard Abegg (1869–1910, US/Japan, nf)
- James Abegglen (1926–2007, Armenia, nf)
- Manuk Abeghyan (1865–1944, Armenia, nf)
- Artashes Abeghyan (1878–1955, Armenia/Germany, nf)
- Kaluta Amri Abeid (1924–1964, Tanzania, nf/p)
- Jacques Abeille (1942–2022, France, f)
- Louise Abeita (1926–2014, US, nf)
- Heinrich Abeken (1809–1872, Germany, nf)
- Hermann Abeken (1820–1854, Germany, nf)
- Alan Abel (1924–2018, US, nf)
- Annie Heloise Abel (1873–1947, US, nf)
- Antoine Abel (1934–2004, Seychelles, p/f)
- Bodo Abel (born 1948, Germany, nf)
- Carl Abel (1837–1906, Germany, nf)
- Clementine Abel (1826–1905, Germany, p)
- Deryck Abel (1918–1965, England, nf)
- Elie Abel (1920–2004, US, nf)
- Elizabeth Abel (born 1945, US, nf)
- Emily Abel (living, US, nf)
- Félix-Marie Abel (1878–1953, France, nf)
- Frederick Abel (1827–1902, England, nf)
- Günter Abel (born 1947, Germany, nf)
- Heinrich F. O. Abel (living, US, nf)
- Jessica Abel (born 1969, US, f/nf)
- Julia Abel Smith (living, England, nf)
- Jordan Abel (living, Canada, f/p)
- Lionel Abel (1910–2001, US, d/nf)
- Maddela Abel (1923–2012, India, nf)
- Mary Abel (c. 1850–1938, US, nf)
- Othenio Abel (1875–1946, Austria, nf)
- Theodore Fred Abel (1896–1988, US, fnf)
- Richard Abel (born 1941, US, nf)
- Siôn Abel (fl. 18th c., Wales, p)
- Theodora Mead Abel (1899–1998, US, nf)
- Brian Abel-Smith (1926–1996, England, nf)
- Anthony Abela (1954-2006, Malta, nf)
- Deborah Abela (born 1966, Australia, ch)
- Henry D. Abelove (born 1945, US, nf)
- Joan Abelove (born 1945, US, ch)
- Inga Ābele (born 1972, Latvia, f)
- Derek F. Abell (born 1938, US, nf)
- George O. Abell (1927-1983, US, nf)
- Peter Abell (born 1939, England, nf)
- Walter Abell (1897–1957, US, nf)
- Westcott Stile Abell (1877–1961, England, nf)
- Alex Abella (born 1950, Cuba/US, nf)
- Delfí Abella (1925-2007, Spain, nf/p)
- Fermín Abella y Blave (1832–1888, Spain, nf)
- José Luis Abellán (1933–2023, Spain, nf)
- Joan Abellan i Mula (born 1946, Spain, f/nf)
- Onofre Abellanosa (1913–1974, Philippines, f)
- Raymond Abellio (1907–1986, France, f/nf)
- Montserrat Abelló i Soler (1918–2014, Spain, p)
- Henry D. Abelove (born 1945, US, nf)
- Joan Abelove (born 1945, US, ch)
- Richard Abels (born 1951, US, nf)
- Werner Abelshauser (born 1944, Germany, nf)
- Donald E. Abelson (living, US, nf)
- Philip Abelson (1913–2004, US, nf)
- Raziel Abelson (1921–2017, US, nf)
- Robert Abelson (1928–2005, US, nf)
- Pulchérie Abeme Nkoghe (born 1980, Gabon, ch/p)
- Hallett Edward Abend (1884–1955, US, nf)
- Walter Abendroth (1896–1973, Germany, nf)
- Hartmut Abendschein (born 1969, Germany/Switzerland, nf)
- Margit Abenius (1899–1970, Sweden, f/nf)
- Vivian Abenshushan (born 1972, Mexico, f)
- Miguel Abensour (1939-2017, France, nf)
- Carlos Federico Abente (1914–2018, Paraguay, p)
- Abeozen (1896–1963, France, f)
- Aria Aber (born 1991, Germany/US, f/p)
- Ted Aber (1914–1989, US, nf)
- Hugo von Abercron (1869–1945, England, nf)
- Laura McLaren, Baroness Aberconway (1854–1933, England, nf)
- David Abercrombie (1909–1992, England, nf)
- Joe Abercrombie (born 1974, England, f)
- Lascelles Abercrombie (1881–1938, England, p/nf)
- Nicholas Abercrombie (born 1944, England, nf)
- P. B. Abercrombie (1917–2003, England, f)
- Patrick Abercrombie (1879–1957, England, nf)
- Thomas A. Abercrombie (1951–2019, US, nf)
- John Abercromby, 5th Baron Abercromby (1841–1924, England, nf)
- Patrick Abercromby (1656 – c. 1716, Scotland/England, nf)
- Ralph Abercromby (1842–1897, Scotland, nf)
- Milan Kujundžić Aberdar (1842–1893, Serbia, nf/p)
- Christer Åberg (born 1964, Norway, nf)
- George Robert Aberigh-Mackay (1848–1881, England/India, nf)
- Aberjhani (born 1957, US, f/nf/p)
- Idriss Aberkane (born 1986, France, nf)
- David Aberle (1918–2004, US, nf)
- Sophie Aberle (1896–1996, US, nf)
- Charles F. Abernathy (born 1946, US, nf)
- Donzaleigh Abernathy (born 1957, US, nf)
- Penny Abernathy (born 1951, US, nf)
- Ralph Abernathy (1926–1990, US, nf)
- Robert Abernathy (1924–1990, US, f)
- Arthur Talmage Abernethy (1872–1956, US, f/nf/p)
- Thomas Perkins Abernethy (1890–1975, US, nf)
- Virginia Abernethy (born 1934, US, nf)
- Peter Abelard (1079–1142, France, nf/p)
- Milan Kujundžić Aberdar (1842–1893, Serbia, p/nf)
- Helen Aberson-Mayer (1907–1999, US, ch)
- Hermann Abert (1870–1927, Germany, nf)
- Joseph Friedrich Abert (1879–1959, Germany, nf)
- Jean-Baptiste Abessolo (born 1932, Gabon, f)
- Giorgio Abetti (1882–1982, Italy, nf)
- Elisabet Abeyà (born 1951, Spain, ch/nf)
- Asanga Abeyagoonasekera (born 1977, Sri Lanka, nf)
- Atula Abeysekera (living, England, nf)
- Chitrananda Abeysekera (1930-1992, England, f/p)
- Tissa Abeysekara (1939-2009, Sri Lanka, f/nf)
- Joe Abeywickrama (1927-2011, Sri Lanka, f)
- Kajetan Abgarowicz (1856–1909, Poland/Austria-Hungary, f)
- Narine Abgaryan (born 1971, USSR/Armenia, f)
- Jean-Marie Abgrall (born 1950, France, nf)
- Abhayanand (living, India, nf)
- Hector Abhayavardhana (1919–2012, Sri Lanka, nf)
- Swami Abhedananda (1866–1939, India, nf)
- Abhishiktananda (1910–1973, France/India, nf)
- Mohammed Abi Samra (born 1953, Lebanon, f)
- Andrea Abi-Karam (living, US, p)
- Alexander Abian (1923–1999, Iran/US, nf)
- Otto W. H. Abich (1806–1886, Germany/Austria, nf)
- Johann Heinrich Abicht (1762–1816, Germany, nf)
- Abid Ali Abid (1906–1971, Pakistan, f/p)
- Helket Idris Abid (born 1988, Iraq, f)
- Azhar Abidi (born 1968, Pakistan/Australia, f)
- Hasan Abidi (1929-2005, India, p)
- Naheed Abidi (born 1961, India, nf)
- Raza Ali Abidi (born 1935, Pakistan, f/nf)
- Crystal Abidin (living, Singapore/Australia, f/nf)
- Bavasan Abiduev (1909–1940, Soviet Union, ch/p)
- Huda Smitshuijzen AbiFarès (born 1965, Lebanon/Netherlands, nf)
- Faridah Àbíké-Íyímídé (living, England, f)
- Ziad Abillama (born 1969, Lebanon/US, nf)
- Hebert Abimorad (born 1946, Uruguay/Sweden, p)
- Abin Joseph (born 1990, India, p)
- Elmaz Abinader (born 1954, US, f/nf/p)
- José Rafael Abinader (1929-2018, Dominican Republic, nf)
- Rowland Abiodun (born 1941, Nigeria/US, nf)
- Robert Abirached (1930-2021, France, nf)
- Zeina Abirached (born 1981, Lebanon, f)
- Lina AbiRafeh (living, Saudi Arabia/US, nf)
- John Omoniyi Abiri (living, Nigeria, f)
- Walter Abish (1931–2022, Austria/US, f)
- Michel Abitbol (born 1943, Morocco/Israel, nf)
- Marat Abiyev (born 1989, Kasakhstan, nf)
- Hossein Mortezaeian Abkenar (born 1967, Iran, f)
- Chris van Abkoude (1880–1960, Netherlands/US, ch), pseudonym Charles Winters
- Hoda Ablan (born 1971, Yemen, p)
- Michael Ableman (living, US/Canada, nf)
- Paul Ableman (1927–2006, England, d/f)
- Ronald F. Abler (born 1939, US, nf)
- Mark Abley (born 1955, Canada, ch/nf/p)
- Jean-Charles Ablitzer (born 1946, France, nf)
- Keith Ablow (born 1961, US, f/nf)
- Dan Abnett (born 1965, US, f)
- Abdel Rahman el-Abnudi (1938–2015, Egypt, p/ch)
- Toru Abo (1947-2016, Japan, nf)
- Abraham Aboab (c. 1560–1642, Portugal/Italy, nf)
- P. A. K. Aboagye (1925-2001, Ghana, f/nf/p)
- Ahmed Abodehman (1949-2025, Saudi Arabia, nf)
- Francisco Aboitiz (living, Chile, nf)
- Yossi Abolafia (born 1944, Israel/Palestine, ch)
- Ali Abolhassani (1955-2012, Iran, nf)
- Josette Abondio (born 1949, Ivory Coast, f/ch)
- Hirmis Aboona (born c. 1940-2009, Iraq/Canada, nf)
- Khaled Abou El Fadl (born 1963, Kuwait/US, nf)
- Dyab Abou Jahjah (born 1971, Lebanon, nf)
- Marguerite Abouet (born 1971, Ivory Coast, f)
- Yousef Abou Louz (born 1956, Jordan, p)
- Ayat Abou Shmeiss (born 1984, Israel, p)
- Saïda Abouba (born 1963, Algeria, f)
- Hamza Ali Aboud (born 1946, Lebanon, f/p)
- Hichem Aboud (born 1955, Algeria/France, nf)
- James Aboud (born 1956, Trinidad and Tobago, p)
- Muhammad bin Nasser Al-Aboudi (1926-2022, Saudi Arabia, nf)
- Marguerite Abouet (born 1971, Côte d'Ivoire, f)
- Badredin Aboughazi (1920–1983, Egypt, nf)
- Mitchell Aboulafia (living, US, nf)
- Leila Aboulela (born 1964, Sudan/Scotland, f/d)
- Colette Aboulker-Muscat (1909–2003, France/Israel, f/nf)
- Marie Rose Abousefian (living, Armenia, f/nf/p)
- Edmond François Valentin About (1828–1885, France, f/nf)
- Leila Abouzeid (born 1950, Morocco, nf/f)
- Rania Abouzeid (living, Lebanon/Australia, f/nf/p)
- Khachatur Abovian (1809–1848, Iran/Armenia, nf)
- Meyer Abovitz (1876–1941, Russia, nf)
- Anatole Abragam (1914–2011, France, nf)
- Amelia Abraham (born 1991, England, nf)
- Amit Abraham (born 1965, India, f/nf)
- Ben Abraham (1924-2015, Poland/Brazil, nf)
- Brad Abraham (living, US, f)
- Carolyn Abraham (born 1968, England/Canada, nf)
- Daniel Abraham (born 1969, US, f)
- David Abraham (born 1946, Belgium/US, nf)
- Eric Abraham (1898–2003, Australia, nf)
- Henry J. Abraham (1921–2020, Germany/US, nf)
- Jay Abraham (living, US, nf)
- John Abraham (1937-1987, India, f)
- Karl Abraham (1877–1925, Germany, nf)
- Katharine Abraham (born 1954, US, nf)
- Kinfe Abraham (1950-2007, Ethiopia, nf)
- Larry H. Abraham (1937-2008, US, nf)
- Michael Abraham (born 1960, Israel, nf)
- Nicolas Abraham (1919–1975, Hungary/France, nf)
- Pearl Abraham (born 1960, Israel/US, f)
- Philip Abraham (1803–1890, England, nf)
- Ralph Abraham (1936-2024, US, nf)
- Spencer Abraham (born 1952, US, nf)
- Sunnykutty Abraham (born 1955, India, nf)
- T. M. Abraham (born 1949, India, d/f)
- Vinu Abraham (living, India, f)
- William Emmanuel Abraham (born 1934, Nigeria/Ghana, nf)
- William J. Abraham (1947-2021, Northern Ireland/US, nf)
- Atossa Araxia Abrahamian (born 1986, Canada, nf)
- Ervand Abrahamian (born 1940, Iran/US, nf)
- Levon Abrahamian (born 1947, Soviet Union/US, nf)
- Israel Abrahams (1858–1927, England, nf)
- Lionel Abrahams (1928–2004, South Africa, f/p/nf)
- Marc Abrahams (born 1956, US, f)
- Peter Abrahams (1919–2017, South Africa, f/nf)
- Peter Abrahams (born 1947, US, ch/f)
- Rehane Abrahams (living, South Africa, d)
- Robert D. Abrahams (1905–1998, US, f/p)
- Robin Abrahams (living, US, nf)
- Roger D. Abrahams (1933-2017, US, f/nf)
- William Abrahams (1919–1998, US, f/nf/p)
- Christine Elizabeth Abrahamsen (1916–1995, US, f)
- Odd Abrahamsen (1924–2001, Norway, p)
- Dinah Abrahamson (1954-2013, US, nf)
- Eric Abrahamson (living, US, nf)
- Kjell Albin Abrahamson (1945-2016, Sweden, nf)
- Jakob Abrahamson (living, Sweden, p)
- Una Abrahamson (1922–1999, England/Canada, nf)
- Henrik Abrahamyan (1939–1999, Armenia, f/nf)
- Sargis Abrahamyan (1915–1969, Armenia, f)
- Miguel M. Abrahão (born 1961, Brazil, ch/f/nf)
- Max Abrahms (born 1977, US, nf)
- Annie Abram (1869–1930, England, nf)
- David Abram (born 1957, US, nf)
- Norm Abram (born 1949, US, nf)
- Halina Abramczyk (born 1951, Poland, nf)
- Cláudio Abramo (1923–1987, Brazil, nf)
- Perseu Abramo (1929–1996, Brazil, nf)
- Edward Abramoski (1933–2022, US, nf)
- Fyodor Abramov (1920–1983, Russia, f)
- Ricardo Abramovay (born 1953, Brazil, nf)
- Dvir Abramovich (born 1971, Israel/Australia, nf)
- Mikhail Abramovich (1859–1940, Russia, p)
- Raphael Abramovitch (1880–1963, Russia/US, nf)
- Abraham Abramovsky (1946–2007, Palestine/US, nf)
- Janet Abramowicz (1930–2020, US, nf)
- Ludwik Abramowicz (1879–1939, Poland, nf)
- Alan Abramowitz (born 1947, US, nf)
- Milton Abramowitz (1915–1958, US, nf)
- Morton I. Abramowitz (1933–2024, US, nf)
- Edward Abramowski (1868–1918, Poland, nf)
- D. Sam Abrams (born 1952, Spain, nf/p)
- Elliott Abrams (born 1948, US, nf)
- Herbert L. Abrams (1920–2016, US, nf)
- Irwin Abrams (1914–2010, US, nf)
- LeRoy Abrams (1874–1956, US, nf)
- Lesley Abrams (born 1952, England, nf)
- Mark Abrams (1906–1994, England, nf)
- Max Abrams (1907–1995, US, nf)
- M. H. Abrams (1912–2015, US, nf)
- Mike Abrams (born 1953, US, nf)
- Minnie F. Abrams (1859–1912, US, nf)
- Sam Abrams (1935–2023, US, p)
- Chimen Abramsky (1916–2010, Russia/England, nf)
- Yehezkel Abramsky (1886–1976, Russia/Israel, nf)
- H. Norman Abramson (1926–2022, US, nf)
- Jadwiga Abramson (1887–1944, Poland, nf)
- Jill Abramson (born 1954, US, nf)
- Lyn Yvonne Abramson (born 1950, US, nf)
- Paul R. Abramson (born 1949, US, nf)
- Seth Abramson (born 1976, US, nf)
- Traci Hunter Abramson (living, US, f)
- Saul Abramzon (1905–1977, Soviet Union, nf)
- Henrique Abranches (1932–2004, Portugal/Angola, p/f/d)
- Sérgio Abranches (born 1949, Brazil, nf)
- Angus Abranson (living, England, p)
- Roger Abrantes (born 1951, Portugal, nf)
- Kosta Abrašević (1879–1898, Serbia, p)
- Elliot Abravanel (living, US, nf)
- Íris Abravanel (born 1948, Brazil, f)
- Andrea Abreu (born 1995, Spain, f/p)
- Antero de Abreu (1927–2017, Angola/Portugal, nf/p)
- Caio Fernando Abreu (1948–1996, Brazil, f/nf)
- Casimiro de Abreu (1839–1960, Brazil, p/f/d)
- Capistrano de Abreu (1853–1927, Brazil, nf)
- Diogo Abreu (born 1947, Portugal, nf)
- Ermilo Abreu Gómez (1894–1971, Mexico, f/nf)
- Florêncio de Abreu (1839–1881, Brazil, f)
- Manuel Arturo Abreu (born 1991, Brazil, p)
- Miguel Vicente de Abreu (1827–1883, Portugal, nf)
- Hussein al Abri (born 1972, Oman, f/nf)
- Laia Abril (born 1986, Spain, nf)
- Mariano Abril y Ostalo (1861–1935, US, nf/p)
- Xavier Abril (1905–1990, Peru/Uruguay, nf/p)
- Jamal Abro (1924-2004, Pakistan, f)
- Mazhar Abro (born 1971, Pakistan, f/p)
- Zahid Abrol (living, India, p)
- Johannes Abromeit (1857–1946, Germany, nf)
- Claude Abromont (born 1955, France, f/nf)
- JoNina Abron-Ervin (born 1948, US, f)
- Joseph Wilfred Abruquah (1921–1997, Gold Coast/Ghana, f)
- Jack Absalom (1927–2019, Australia, nf)
- Dannie Abse (1923–2014, Wales, nf/p)
- Joan Abse (1926–2005, England, nf)
- Leo Abse (1917–2008, Wales/England, nf)
- Wilfred Abse (1915–2005, Wales, nf)
- David Manker Abshire (1926-2014, US, nf)
- Alain Absire (born 1950, France, f)
- Karla Absolonová-Bufková (1855–1941, Austria/Czechoslovakia, nf)
- Clark C. Abt (born 1929, Germany/US, nf)
- Felix Abt (born 1955, Switzerland/North Korea, nf)
- Thomas Abt (born 1972, US, nf)
- Vicki Abt (1942-2026, US, nf)
- Mohammad-Ali Abtahi (born 1960, Iran, nf)
- Eugenia Abu (born 1962, Nigeria, f/p)
- Batool Abu Akleen (born 2005, Palestine, p)
- Al Said Mustafa Ahmad Abu Al Kheir (born 1957, Egypt, nf)
- Ziad Abu Amr (born 1950, Palestine, nf)
- Maymuna Abu Bakr (born 1948, Yemen, p)
- Nadia Abu El Haj (born 1962, US, nf)
- Hamdi Abu Golayyel (1968–2023, Egypt, f)
- Samer Abu Hawwash (born 1972, Lebanon, p)
- Fawziyya Abu Khalid (born 1955, Saudi Arabia, p)
- Azizah Abd Allah Abu Lahum (born 1945, Yemen, f)
- Muhammed Abu Maatouk (born 1950, Syria, d/f)
- Zulaikha Abu Risha (born 1942, Jordan, p/nf)
- Taysir Abu Saada (1951–2026, Palestine/Jordan, f/nf)
- Atef Abu Saif (born 1973, Palestine, f)
- Salman Abu Sitta (born 1937, Palestine/England, nf)
- Mustafa Abu Sway (born 1958, Palestine/US, nf)
- Abu Yahya (born 1969, Pakistan, f/nf)
- Mohammed Abu Zaid (born 1980, Egypt, f/p)
- Abd al-Wahhab Abu Zayd (living, Saudi Arabia, f/p)
- Mírzá Abu'l-Faḍl (1844–1914, Persia, nf)
- Umayya Abu-Hanna (born 1961, Israel/Netherlands, f)
- Nejla Abu-Izzedin (1907–2008, Lebanon, nf)
- Diana Abu-Jaber (born 1961, US, f/nf)
- Mumia Abu-Jamal (born 1954, US, nf)
- Ibrahim Abu-Lughod (1929-2001, Palestine, nf)
- Janet Abu-Lughod (1928-2013, US, nf)
- Lila Abu-Lughod (born 1952, US, nf)
- Mohammed Abu-Nimer (living, Palestine/US, nf)
- Sarab Abu-Rabia-Queder (born 1976, Israel, nf)
- Refqa Abu-Remaileh (living, Jordan, f/nf)
- Mahmoud Abu-Saud (1911–1993, Sudan/US, nf)
- Muhsin Abu-Tabikh (1878–1961, Iraq, nf)
- Kareem James Abu-Zeid (born 1981, Egypt/US, f)
- Efren Abueg (born 1937, Philippines, f/nf)
- Izzeldin Abuelaish (born 1955, Palestine/Canada, nf)
- Nasser Abufarha (born 1964, Palestine/Canada, nf)
- Jessica Abughattas (living, US, p)
- As'ad AbuKhalil (born 1960, Lebanon/US, nf)
- Ahmed Abukhater (born 1977, Palestine/US, nf)
- Mona Abul-Fadl (1945-2008, Egypt, nf)
- Anna Abulafia (born 1952, Netherlands/England, nf)
- David Abulafia (1949–2026, England, nf)
- Susan Abulhawa (born 1970, Kuwait/US, f)
- Dubai Abulhoul (born 1996, UAE, f)
- Enrique Sánchez Abulí (born 1945, France/Spain, f)
- Ali Abunimah (born 1971, US, nf)
- Said Aburish (1935-2012, Palestine, nf)
- Abdul Hamid AbuSulayman (1936-2021, Saudi Arabia/US, nf)
- François-Joseph Amon d'Aby (1913–2007, Ivory Coast, d/nf)
- Mayramkan Abylkasymova (1936–2021, Kyrgyzstan, p)
- Bella Abzug (1920–1998, US, nf)
- Lauren Acampora (living, US, f)
- Jacques Acar (1937-1976, Belgium, f)
- Nolasc Acarín Tusell (born 1941, Spain, f)
- Leyla Acaroglu (living, Australia, nf)
- Evelyne Accad (born 1943, Lebanon/France, f/nf)
- Silvio Accame (1910–1997, Italy, nf)
- Maria T. Accardi (living, US, nf)
- Millicent Borges Accardi (living, US, f/p)
- Xavier Accart (born 1971, France, nf)
- Luisa Accati (born 1942, Italy, nf)
- Bandaru Acchamamba (1874–1905, India, f/nf)
- Elio Filippo Accrocca (1923–1996, Italy, p/nf)
- Felice Accrocca (born 1959, Italy, nf)
- Juliet Ace (1938–2025, Wales, nf)
- Francisco Acebal (1866–1933, Spain, f)
- Daron Acemoglu (born 1967, Turkey/US, nf)
- David Acer (born 1970, Canada, nf)
- Alberto Acereda (born 1965, Spain, nf)
- Jude Acers (born 1944, US, nf)
- Vera Aceva (1919–2006, Yugoslavia, f/nf/p)
- Antonio Acevedo Hernández (1886–1962, Chile, f/nf/p)
- Bianca Acevedo (living, US, nf)
- Carmen Acevedo Vega (1913–2006, Ecuador, f/p)
- Eduardo Acevedo Díaz (1851–1921, Uruguay, f/nf)
- Isidoro Acevedo (1867–1952, Spain/Soviet Union, nf)
- María Dolores Acevedo (1932–1998, Spain, f)
- María Josefa Acevedo (1803–1861, New Granada, f/nf)
- Rodolfo Acevedo (1951–2012, Chile, nf)
- Jorge Luis Acha (1946-1996, Argentina, d/f/nf)
- Mohammed Achaari (born 1951, Morocco, f/p)
- Carole Achache (born 1952, France, f)
- Nana Achampong (born 1964, Ghana, f/p)
- Guy Achard (born 1936, France, nf)
- Louis Amédée Achard (1814–1875, France, f)
- Janhavi Acharekar (born 1973, India, f/nf)
- Hrachia Acharian (1876–1953, Ottoman Empire/Soviet Union, nf)
- Abhimanyu Acharya (born 1994, India, f)
- Amitav Acharya (born 1962, India/US, nf)
- Anil Acharya (living, India, f/nf/p)
- Baburam Acharya (1888–1971, Nepalese, nf)
- Bhanubhakta Acharya (1814–1868, Nepal, p)
- Diwakar Acharya (born 1969, Nepal/England, nf)
- Francis Acharya (1912–2002, Belgium/India, nf)
- Hari Bansha Acharya (born 1957, Nepal, f/nf)
- Manmohan Acharya (born 1967, India, nf/p)
- Nand Kishore Acharya (born 1945, India, nf/p)
- Nara Nath Acharya (1906–1988, Nepal, nf/p)
- P. Sri Acharya (1886–1981, India, f/nf/p)
- P. V. Acharya (1915–1992, India, f/nf/p)
- Paramananda Acharya (1893–1971, India, nf)
- Santanu Kumar Acharya (born 1933, India, ch/f/nf)
- Subhrangsu Kanta Acharyya (born 1940, Bangladesh/India, nf)
- K. T. Achaya (1923–2002, India, nf)
- Gilbert Achcar (born 1951, Lebanon/France, nf)
- Achdé (born 1961, France, f)
- Chinua Achebe (1930–2013, Nigeria, f/p/nf)
- Nwando Achebe (born 1970, Nigeria/US, nf)
- Mkrtich Achemian (1838–1917, Ottoman Empire, p)
- Sven Tito Achen (1922–1986, Argentina/Denmark, f/nf)
- Gerd B. Achenbach (born 1947, Germany, nf)
- Joel Achenbach (born 1960, US, nf)
- Anna Maria Achenrainerh (1909–1972, Austria, f)
- Alison Acheson (living, Canada, ch/f)
- David Acheson (born 1946, England, nf)
- David Campion Acheson (1921–2018, US, nf)
- Dean Acheson (1893–1971, US, nf)
- Taro Achi (阿智太郎, born 1980, Japan, f)
- Giacinto Achilli (1803–1860, Papal States, nf)
- Peter Achinstein (born 1935, US, nf)
- Arthur Achleitner (1858–1927, Austria, nf)
- Friedrich Achleitner (1930–2019, Austria, nf/p)
- Catherine Obianuju Acholonu (1951–2014, Nigeria, p/d/nf)
- Swami Achootanand (1879–1933, India, nf/p)
- Shawn Achor (born 1978, US, nf)
- Mohamed El Aziz Ben Achour (born 1951, Tunisia, nf)
- Mouloud Achour (1944-2020, Algeria, nf)
- Elizabeth Achtemeier (1926-2002, US, nf)
- Roberta Achtenberg (born 1950, US, nf)
- Gerrit Achterberg (1905–1962, Netherlands, p)
- Jeanne Achterberg (1942–2012, US, nf)
- Hans Achterhuis (born 1942, Netherlands, nf)
- Herbert Achternbusch (1938-2022, Germany, f)
- Said Achtouk (1925–1989, Morocco, p)
- Hugo Achugar (born 1944, Uruguay, f/nf/p)
- A. Achuthan (1933–2022, India, nf)
- M. Achuthan (1930–2017, India, nf)
- V. S. Achuthanandan (1923–2025, India, nf)
- Chathanath Achuthanunni (born 1939, India, ch/f/nf/p)
- Rakhat Achylova (1941–2015, Kyrgyzstan, nf)
- Tekumalla Achyutarao (1880–1947, India, nf)
- Cristina Acidini (born 1951, Italy, f/nf)
- Alexander Aciman (born 1990, US, nf)
- André Aciman (born 1951, Egypt/US, f/nf)
- Stella Aciman (born 1953, Turkey, f)
- Bhaddanta Āciṇṇa (born 1934, Myanmar, nf)
- Socorro Acioli (born 1975, Brazil, f/ch)
- Marc Acito (born 1966, US, f)
- Flutura Açka (born 1966, Albania, f/p)
- Martha Ackelsberg (born 1946, US, nf)
- Agnès Acker (born 1940, France/Germany, nf)
- Ally Acker (born 1954, US, f/nf/p)
- Kathy Acker (1947–1997, US, f/d/nf)
- Paul Acker (1874–1915, Germany, f)
- J. R. Ackerley (1896–1967, England, nf)
- Joan Acker (1924–2016, US, nf)
- Brooke Ackerly (living, US, nf)
- Blaster Al Ackerman (1939-2013, US, f/nf)
- Bruce Ackerman (born 1943, US, nf)
- Dan Ackerman (born 1974, US, nf)
- Diane Ackerman (born 1948, US, nf/p)
- Elliot Ackerman (born 1980, US, f/nf)
- Felicia Nimue Ackerman (born 1947, US, f/nf/p)
- Forrest J. Ackerman (1916–2008, US, f)
- Frank Ackerman (1946–2019, US, nf)
- Frederick L. Ackerman (1878–1950, US, nf)
- Galia Ackerman (born 1948, Russia/France, nf)
- James S. Ackerman (1919–2016, US, nf)
- Jennifer Ackerman (born 1959, US, nf)
- Karen Ackerman (born 1951, US, ch)
- Keith Ackerman (born 1946, US, nf)
- Margaret Ackerman (living, US, nf)
- Marianne Ackerman (born 1952, Canada, f)
- Martin S. Ackerman (1932-1993, US, nf)
- Nathan Ackerman (1908–1971, Russia, nf)
- Phyllis Ackerman (1893–1977, US, nf)
- Raymond Ackerman (1931–2023, US, nf)
- Spencer Ackerman (born 1980, US, nf)
- Susan Ackerman (born 1958, US, nf)
- Denise Ackermann (born 1939, South Africa, nf)
- Jessie Ackermann (1857–1951, US, nf)
- Lea Ackermann (1937-2023, Germany, nf)
- Liliane Ackermann (1938-2007, France, nf)
- Louise-Victorine Ackermann (1813–1890, France, p)
- Rudolph Ackermann (1764–1834, Germany/England, p)
- Silke Ackermann (born 1961, Germany/England, nf)
- Erwin Ackerknecht (1906–1988, Germany/US, nf)
- Maximiliane Ackers (1896–1982, Germany, f)
- Duane Ackerson (1942–2020, US, p/f)
- Paige Ackerson-Kiely (born 1975, US, p)
- Martha Ackmann (born 1951, US, nf)
- Jenny Ackland (living, Australia, f)
- Len Ackland (born 1944, US, nf)
- Valentine Ackland (1906–1969, England, p)
- William Hayes Ackland (1855–1940, US, f)
- Bob Ackles (1938–2008, Canada, nf)
- Edith Flack Ackley (1887–1970, US, nf)
- Gardner Ackley (1915–1998, US, nf)
- Danielle Ackley-McPhail (born 1970, US, f/nf)
- George Moreby Acklom (1870–1959, England/US, nf)
- Martha Ackmann (born 1951, US, nf)
- Russell L. Ackoff (1919–2009, US, nf)
- Dragoljub Acković (1952–2025, Serbia, nf)
- J. L. Ackrill (1921–2007, England, nf)
- Robert Ackrill (1816–1894, England, nf)
- Ursula Ackrill (born 1974, Romania/Germany, f/nf)
- Joyce Ackroyd (1918–1991, Australia, nf)
- Peter Ackroyd (1917–2005, England, nf)
- Peter Ackroyd (born 1949, England, nf/f)
- Charles R. Acland (born 1963, Canada, nf)
- Richard Acland (1906–1990, England, nf)
- Simon Acland (born 1958, England, f)
- Geneviève Aclocque (1884–1967, France, nf)
- Alexandre Acloque (1871–1941, France, nf)
- Joan Acocella (1945–2024, US, nf)
- Nick Acocella (1943–2020, US, nf)
- Frances Dorothy Acomb (1907–1984, US, nf)
- Janice Acoose (1954–2020, Canada, f/nf)
- Derek Acorah (1950–2020, England, nf)
- Milton Acorn (1923–1986, US, d/p)
- Agustín Acosta (1886–1979, Cuba, nf/p)
- Cecilio Acosta (1818–1881, New Granada/Venezuela, f/p)
- Delfina Acosta (born 1956, Paraguay, f/p)
- Jim Acosta (born 1971, US, nf)
- Joaquín Acosta (1800–1852, New Granada, nf)
- Marta Acosta (living, US, f/nf)
- Óscar Acosta (1933–2014, Honduras, nf/p)
- Phyllis B. Acosta (1933–2018, US, nf)
- Pilar Acosta Martínez (1938–2006, Spain, nf)
- Soledad Acosta (1833–1913, New Granada/Colombia, f/nf)
- Vicente Acosta (1867–1908, El Salvador, p)
- Kobena Eyi Acquah (born 1952, Ghana, p)
- Kofi Acquah-Dadzie (born 1939, Gold Coast/Ghana, nf)
- Germaine Acremant (1889–1986, France, f)
- Avis Acres (1910–1994, New Zealand, ch)
- Francesco Acri (1834–1913, Italy, nf)
- József Ács (born 1965, Hungary, f)
- Zoltan Acs (born 1947, US, nf)
- Ignác Acsády (1845–1906, Hungary, f/nf)
- George Acsinteanu (1905–1987, Romania, f/nf)
- Eliza Acton (1799–1859, England, nf)
- Edward Acton (born 1949, Rhodesia/England, nf)
- Harold Acton (1904–1994, Italy/England, nf)
- H. B. Acton (1908–1974, England/Scotland, nf)
- James M. Acton (living, UK, nf)
- Johnny Acton (born 1966, England, f/nf)
- William Acton (1813–1875, England, nf)
- Angelina Acuña (1905–2006, Guatemala, f/p)
- Daniel Acuña (born 1974, Spain, f)
- Luis Alberto Acuña Gatillon (1927-2005, Chile, f)
- Manuel Acuña (1849–1873, Mexico, p/f/d)
- Rodolfo Acuña (1932–2026, US, nf)
- Bernard Acworth (1885–1963, England, nf)
- Amir Aczel (1950-2015, Israel/France, nf)
- János Aczél (died 1523, Hungary, p)
- Tamás Aczél (1921–1994, Hungary, p/nf)
- Alma Flor Ada (born 1938, Cuba/US, ch/nf/p)
- Ken Adachi (1929-1989, Canada, nf)
- Mitsuru Adachi (安達充, born 1951, Japan, f)
- Babatunde Kwaku Adadevoh (1933-1997, Nigeria, nf)
- Shimon Adaf (born 1972, Israel, f/nf/p)
- Kavetsa Adagala (1947-2014, Kenya, nf)
- Allan Adair (1897–1988, England, nf)
- Barbara Adair (living, South Africa, f/nf)
- Cherry Adair (born 1952, South Africa/US, f)
- Gilbert Adair (1944–2011, Scotland, f/p/nf)
- Hazel Adair (1900–1990, England, f/nf)
- John Adair (1913–1997, US, nf)
- John Adair (1934–2025, England, nf)
- John G. Adair (living, Canada, nf)
- Robert Adair (1924-2020, US, nf)
- Virginia Hamilton Adair (1913–2004, US, p)
- William Penn Adair (1830–1880, US, nf)
- Nancy Adajania (born 1971, India, nf)
- Adalbert of Bavaria (1886–1970, Germany, nf)
- Sigrún Aðalbjarnardóttir (born 1949, Iceland, nf)
- Kutlu Adalı (1935-1996, Cyprus, nf/p)
- Sibel Adalı (living, Turkey/US, nf)
- Geormbeeyi Adali-Mortty (born 1916, Gold Coast/Ghana, p/nf)
- Varsha Adalja (born 1940, India, f)
- Carolyne Adalla (living, Kenya, nf)
- Adam al-Sirgany (living, US, f)
- Adam de la Halle (1240–1287, France, p)
- Abdul Hameed Adam (1910–1981, Pakistan, p)
- Adela Marion Adam (1866–1944, England, nf)
- Andrew Adam (born 1957, US, nf)
- Alexander Adam (1741–1809, Scotland, nf)
- Alison Adam (living, England, nf)*Alison Adam (living, England, nf)
- August Adam (1888–1965, Germany, nf)
- Barbara Adam (born 1945, Germany/UK, nf)
- Claire Adam (born 1973, Trinidad and Tobago, f)
- David Adam (1936-2020, England, nf)
- Elhadi Adam (1927-2006, Sudan, p)
- Frank Adam (born 1968, Belgium, d/nf)
- Georgina Adam (living, US, nf)
- Graeme Mercer Adam (1839–1912, Canada, nf)
- Helen Adam (1909–1993, Scotland, p)
- H. Pearl Adam (1882–1957, England, nf)
- Heribert Adam (born 1936, Germany/Canada, nf)
- Ioan Adam (1875–1911, Romania, f)
- James Adam (1860–1907, Scotland, nf)
- Jean Adam (1704–1765, Scotland, p), also Adams
- Jean-Pierre Adam (born 1937, France, nf)
- John A. Adam (living, England/US, nf)
- Juliette Adam (1836–1936, France, nf)
- Karl Adam (1876–1966, Germany, nf)
- Magda Ádám (1925-2017, Ukraine/England, nf)
- Nathif Jama Adam (living, Kenya, nf)
- Neil Kensington Adam (1891–1973, England, nf)
- Olivier Adam (born 1974, France, f)
- Paul Adam (1862–1920, France, f)
- Paul Adam (born 1958, England, f/ch)
- Peggy Adam (born 1974, France, f)
- Peter Adam (1929-2019, Germany/England, nf)
- Pip Adam (born 1970, New Zealand, f/nf)
- Rhiannon Adam (born 1985, Ireland, f)
- Robert Adam (born 1948, England, nf)
- Ronald Adam (1896–1979, England, f/nf)
- Ruth Adam (1907–1977, England, f/nf)
- Stephen Adam (1848–1910, Scotland, nf)
- Theo Adam (1926–2019, Germany, nf)
- Wilhelm Adam (1893–1978, Germany, nf)
- Will Adam (born 1969, England, nf)
- Patsy Adam-Smith (1924-2001, Australia, nf)
- Emmanuel Adamakis (born 1958, Greece, nf)
- Beqa Adamashvili (born 1990, Georgia, f)
- Andrew Adamatzky (living, England, nf)
- Bini Adamczak (born 1979, Germany, nf)
- Monika Adamczyk-Garbowska (born 1956, Poland, nf)
- Ludwig W. Adamec (1924–2019, Austria, nf)
- Gheorghe Adamescu (1869–1942, Romania, nf)
- Friedrich Wilhelm Adami (1816–1893, Germany, f/nf)
- John George Adami (1862–1926, England, nf)
- Louis Adamic (1898–1951, Austria-Hungary/US, nf)
- Anatoly Adamishin (1934–2025, Russia, nf)
- Fereydun Adamiyat (1920–2008, Iran, nf)
- Armen Adamjan (born 1989, Armenia/US, nf)
- Christine Adamo (born 1965, France, f)
- Ladipo Adamolekun (born 1942, Nigeria, nf)
- Evangelia Adamou (living, France, nf)
- Arthur Adamov (1908–1970, Russia, d/f)
- Grigory Adamov (1886–1945, Soviet Union, f)
- Anton Adamovič (1909–1998, Russia, f/nf)
- Draginja Adamović (1925–2000, Yugoslavia/Serbia, p)
- Ratko Adamović (1942–2025, Yugoslavia/Serbia, nf/f)
- Ales Adamovich (1927–1994, Bielorrusian SSR/Russia, f)
- Georgy Adamovich (1892–1972, Russia/France, nf/p)
- Slavamir Adamovich (born 1962, USSR/Bielorussia, p)
- Adeline Pond Adams (1859–1948, US, f/nf)
- Alice Adams (1926–1999, US, f)
- Almeda C. Adams (1865–1949, US, nf)
- Alyssa Adams (living, US, nf)
- Anna Adams (1926-2011, England, p)
- Andrea Adams (1946–1995, England, nf)
- Andrew Leith Adams (1827–1882, Scotland, nf)
- Andy Adams (1859–1935, US, f)
- Amanda Adams (living, US, nf)
- Andrew Leith Adams (1827–1882, Scotland/Ireland, nf)
- Anna Adams (1926–2011, England, p)
- Annmarie Adams (born 1960, Canada, nf)
- Arlin Adams (1921–2015, US, nf)
- Arthur Adams (born 1963, US, f)
- Arthur Henry Adams (1872–1936, New Zealand/Australia, nf/p/d)
- Barbara Adams (1945–2002, England, nf)
- Bernard Adams (1890–1917, England, nf)
- Brandon Adams (born 1978, US, f/nf)
- Brooks Adams (1848–1927, US, nf)
- Byron Adams (born 1955, US, nf)
- Cara Blue Adams (living, US, f)
- Carol J. Adams (born 1951, US, f)
- Cecil Adams (living, US, nf)
- Charles Francis Adams Jr. (1835–1915, US, nf)
- Charles Follen Adams (1842–1918, US, p)
- Charles Kendall Adams (1835–1902, US, nf)
- Charles Warren Adams (1833–1903, England, nf/f)
- Chris Adams (born 1930, US, nf)
- Cindy Adams (born 1930, US, nf)
- Clinton Adams (1918–2002, US, nf)
- Colin Adams (born 1956, US, nf)
- Cyd Adams (1949–2005, US, p)
- Cyrus Cornelius Adams (1849–1928, US, nf)
- Cyrus Field Adams (1858–1942, US, nf)
- David Adams (1845–1922, Wales, nf)
- David Adams (born 1939, US, nf)
- Deborah Adams (living, US, f)
- Doug Adams (living, US, f)
- Douglas Adams (1952–2001, England, f/d)
- Elizabeth Laura Adams (1909–1982, US, f/nf)
- Elizabeth Nelson Adams (1941–2020, US, f/p)
- Ephraim Douglass Adams (1865–1930, US, nf)
- Evangeline Adams (1868–1932, US, nf)
- Francis Adams (1862–1893, Malta/England, nf/f/p)
- Francis Colburn Adams (1850–1891, US, f)
- Francis Ottiwell Adams (1825–1889, England, nf)
- Frank Dawson Adams (1859–1942, Canada, nf)
- Frank R. Adams (1883–1963, US, f)
- Franklin P. Adams (1881–1960, US, nf)
- Fred Adams (born 1961, US, nf)
- Frederick Adams (living, US, nf)
- Frederick Baldwin Adams Jr. (1910–2001, US, nf)
- Frederick Upham Adams (1859–1921, US, f/nf)
- Gail Galloway Adams (born 1943, US, f)
- George Burton Adams (1851–1925, US, nf)
- George Cooke Adams (1865–1934, Australia, nf)
- George Matthew Adams (1878–1962, US, nf)
- George Rollie Adams (born 1941, US, f)
- George W. Adams (academic) (1905–1981, US, nf)
- Gerry Adams (born 1948, Ireland, nf)
- Glenda Adams (1939–2007, Australia, f)
- Guy Adams (born 1976, England, f)
- Harriet Adams (1892–1982, US, ch)
- Hélène Deschamps Adams (1921–2006, France/US, nf)
- Henry Adams (1813–1877, England, nf)
- Henry Adams (1838–1918, US, nf)
- Henry Cadwallader Adams (1817–1899, England, ch/nf/p)
- Henry Carter Adams (1851–1921, US, nf)
- Henry Foster Adams (1882–1973, US, nf)
- Herb Adams (born 1955, US, nf)
- Herbert Adams (1874–1958, England, f)
- Herbert Baxter Adams (1850–1901, US, nf)*J. C. Adams (born 1970, US, f/nf)
- Howard Adams (1921–2001, US, nf)
- Ian Adams (1937–2021, Canada, d/f/nf)
- J. C. Adams (born 1970, US, f/nf)
- J. Christian Adams (born 1968, US, nf)
- J. Michael Adams (1947-2012, US, nf)
- Jad Adams (born 1954, England, nf)
- James Adams (living, England/US, nf)
- James Barton Adams (1843–1918, US, p)
- James Noel Adams (1943–2021, Australia, nf)
- James Truslow Adams (1878–1949, US, nf)
- Jane Adams (born 1960, England, f)
- Janus Adams (born 1947, US, nf)
- Jarrett M. Adams (living, US, nf)
- Jay E. Adams (1929-2020, US, nf)
- Jennie Adams (born 1963, Australia, f)
- John Adams (1704–1740, British N American colonies, p)
- John Adams (1918–2008, England, ch)
- John Adams (1938–2024, England, nf)
- Julia Adams (born 1957, US, nf)
- John G. Adams (1932-2003, US, nf)
- John Joseph Adams (born 1976, US, f)
- John Turvill Adams (1805–1882, US, f)
- Julius Walker Adams (1812–1899, US, nf)
- Jüri Adams (born 1947, Estonia, nf)
- Karl Adams (1811–1849, Switzerland, nf)
- Kathleen M. Adams (living, US, nf)
- Keith Adams (1926-2012, Australia, nf)
- Kylie Adams (living, US, f)
- Lavonne Adams (living, US, f/p)
- Leon Adams (1905–1995, US, nf)
- Léonie Adams (1899–1988, US, p)
- Lois Bryan Adams (1817–1870, US, p)
- Lorraine Adams (living, US, f/nf)
- Louise Doris Adams (1889–1965, England, nf)
- Marguerite Janvrin Adams (1889–1957, US, p)
- Marilyn McCord Adams (1943–2017, US, nf)
- Mary Adams (1898–1984, England, ch)
- Mary Hall Adams (1816–1860, US, nf)
- Mary Mathews Adams (1840–1902, Ireland/US, p)
- Matthew J. Adams (living, US, nf)
- Max Adams (living, England, nf)
- Max D. Adams (living, US, nf)
- Maynard Adams (1919–2003, US, nf)
- Michael Adams (1920–2005, England, nf)
- Mildred Adams (1894–1980, US, nf)
- Nehemiah Adams (1806–1878, US, nf)
- Noah Adams (1942–2026, US, nf)
- Oscar Fay Adams (1855–1919, US, nf)
- Parveen Adams (born 1939, England, nf)
- Patch Adams (born 1945, US, nf)
- Patricia J. Adams (born 1952, Anguilla, p/nf)
- Phillip Adams (born 1939, Australia, f/nf)
- Poppy Adams (born 1983, England, f)
- R. J. Q. Adams (born 1943, US, nf)
- Ramon Frederick Adams (1889–1976, US, nf/p)
- Randolph Greenfield Adams (1892–1951, US, nf)
- Richard Adams (1920–2016, England, f)
- Richard Adams (born 1946, England, nf)
- Robert Adams (1928–1997, US, nf)
- Robert Adams (1933–1990, US, f)
- Richard C. Adams (1864–1921, US, nf/p)
- Robert McCormick Adams Jr. (1926–2018, US, nf)
- Robert Merrihew Adams (1937–2024, US, nf)
- Roy Adams (living, US/Canada, p/f/nf)
- Russell L. Adams (born 1930, US, nf)
- Ryan Adams (born 1974, US, p)
- Samuel A. Adams (1934–1988, US, nf)
- Samuel Hopkins Adams (1871–1958, US, f/nf)
- Sarah F. F. Adams (1805–1848, US, nf)
- Scott Adams (1957–2026, US, nf)
- Sean Adams (living, US, nf)
- Sherman Adams (1899–1986, US, nf)
- Steph Adams (born 1977, Australia, nf)
- Steve Adams (born 1947, US, nf)
- Sunrise Adams (living, US, nf)
- Thomas Albert Smith Adams (1839–1888, US, p)
- Thomas Boylston Adams (1910–1997, US, nf)
- Thomas R. Adams (1921–2008, US, nf)
- Thomas Sewall Adams (1873–1933, US, nf)
- Tracy Adams (living, US/New Zealand, nf)
- Valmar Adams (1899–1993, Estonia, f/p)
- Walter Adams (1922–1998, Austria/US, nf)
- William Henry Davenport Adams (1928–1991, England, nf)
- William Adams (1807–1880, US, nf)
- William Adams (1813–1897, US, nf)
- William Adams (1814–1848, England, nf)
- William Davenport Adams (1851–1904, England, nf)
- William Grylls Adams (1836–1915, England, nf)
- William H. D. Adams (1828–1891, England, nf)
- William Howard Adams (1926–2023, US, nf)
- William M. Adams (born 1955, England, nf)
- William Taylor Adams (1822–1897, US, f)
- William Y. Adams (1927–2019, US, nf)
- Yolanda Adams (born 1961, US, nf)
- Marion Adams-Acton (1846–1928, Scotland, ch/nf)
- Gerceida E. Adams-Jones (living, US, nf)
- Patsy Adam-Smith (1924–2001, Australia, nf)
- Carl Adamshick (born 1969, US, p)
- George Adamski (1891–1965, US, f/nf)
- Anthony Adamson (1906–2002, Canada, nf)
- Bartlett Adamson (1884–1951, Australia, f/nf/p)
- Catherine Adamson (1868–1925, New Zealand, nf)
- Donald Adamson (1939–2024, England, nf)
- Hans Christian Adamson (1890–1968, Denmark/US, f/nf)
- Hendrik Adamson (1891–1946, Russian E/Estonia, p/f)
- George Adamson (1906–1989, England/Kenya, nf)
- George Worsley Adamson (1913–2005, US/England, ch/f)
- Gil Adamson (born 1961, Canada, f)
- Glenn Adamson (born 1972, US, nf)
- Hendrik Adamson (1891–1946, Estonia, p)
- Henry Adamson (1581–1637, Scotland, p/nf)
- Ian Adamson (1944-2019, US, nf)
- Isaac Adamson (born 1971, US, f)
- Jack H. Adamson (1918–1975, England, nf)
- Jean Adamson (1928–2024, England, ch)
- Joe Adamson (living, US, nf)
- John Adamson (1787–1855, England, nf)
- Joni Adamson (born 1958, US, nf)
- Joy Adamson (1910–1980, Austria-Hungary/Kenya, nf)
- Lauren Adamson (1948–2021, US, nf)
- Peter Adamson (born 1972, US, nf)
- Robert Adamson (1852–1902, Scotland, nf)
- Robert Adamson (1943–2022, Australia, nf/p)
- Sofia Adamson (1916–2007, US, nf)
- Eriks Ādamsons (1907–1946, Latvia, f/p)
- Kari Adamsons (living, US, nf)
- Abdalla Uba Adamu (born 1956, Nigeria, nf)
- Jerzy Adamuszek (born 1955, Poland, nf)
- Avraham Adan (1926–2012, Israel, nf)
- Martín Adán (1908–1985, Peru, p/f)
- Katarina Adanja (1921–1989, Yugoslavia/Serbia, nf)
- Tamar Adar (1939-2008, Palestine/Israel, d/f/p)
- Nayana Adarkar (born 1959, India, f/p)
- Abd al-Wahhab Adarrak (1666–1746, Morocco, nf/p)
- Michael Adas (born 1943, US, nf)
- Katya Adaui (born 1977, Peru, f/ch)
- Nasra Al Adawi (living, Oman, p)
- Emma Adbåge (born 1982, Sweden, ch)
- Lisen Adbåge (born 1982, Sweden, f/ch)
- Alison Adburgham (1912–1997, England, nf)
- Arthur St John Adcock (1864–1930, England, f/p)
- Betty Adcock (born 1938, US, p)
- Fleur Adcock (1934–2024, New Zealand/England, p)
- Juana Adcock (born 1982, Mexico/Scotland, p)
- Thomas Adcock (born 1947, US, f/nf)
- Calpernia Addams (born 1971, US, nf)
- Jane Addams (1860–1935, US, nf)
- Claude Addas (living, France/Poland, nf)
- Garnik Addarian (1925-1986, Armenia/France, nf/p)
- Caroline Adderson (born 1963, Canada, f)
- James Adderley (1861–1942, England, nf)
- John Addey (1920–1982, England, nf)
- Goggo Addi (c. 1911–1999, Camaroon, f)
- Bob Addie (1910–1982, US, nf)
- John Hubbard, 1st Baron Addington (1805–1889, England, nf)
- Sarah Addington (1891–1940, US, ch)
- John Addis (1914–1983, England, nf)
- Mabel Addis (1912–2004, US, nf)
- Mark Addis (born 1969, England, nf)
- Yda Hillis Addis (1857–1902?, England, nf)
- William Edward Addis (1844–1917, Scotland/Australia, f/nf)
- Stephen Addiss (1935–2022, US, nf)
- Albert Christopher Addison (1862–1935, England, nf)
- Charles G. Addison (1812–1866, England, nf)
- Corban Addison (living, US, f/nf)
- Daniel Dulany Addison (1863–1936, US, nf)
- Harry W. Addison (1920–2003, US, nf)
- James Thayer Addison (1887–1953, US, nf)
- Joseph Addison (1672–1719, England, nf)
- Linda Addison (born 1952, US, f/p)
- Paul Addison (1943–2020, England, nf)
- William Wilkinson Addison (1905–1992, England, nf)
- Lucia H. Faxon Additon (1847–1919, US, nf)
- Jonathan Addleton (born 1957, US, nf)
- Percy Addleshaw (1866–1916, England, f/nf/p)
- Robert Addo-Fening (born 1935, Ghana, nf)
- Sulaiman Addonia (born 1974, Ethiopia/England, f)
- Kim Addonizio (born 1954, US, p/f)
- Peter Adds (living, New Zealand, nf)
- Marian Ewurama Addy (1942–2014, Ghana, nf)
- Sidney Oldall Addy (1848–1933, England, f/nf)
- George Ade (1866–1944, US, f)
- Jane Henrietta Adeane (1842–1926, England, nf)
- Wale Adebanwi (born 1969, Nigeria/England, nf)
- Akanmu Adebayo (born 1956, Nigeria, nf)
- Ayobami Adebayo (born 1988, Nigeria, f/p)
- Diran Adebayo (born 1968, England, f/nf)
- Peter Awelewa Adebiyi (1943-2022, Nigeria, nf)
- Bayo Adebowale (born 1944, Nigeria, f/p)
- Oludamola Adebowale (living, Nigeria, nf)
- Enoch Adeboye (born 1942, Nigeria, nf)
- Olufunke Adeboye (living, Nigeria, nf)
- Dayo Adedayo (born 1964, Nigeria/England, nf)
- Remi Adedeji (born 1937, Nigeria, ch)
- Mahfouz Adedimeji (living, Nigeria, nf)
- Nath Mayo Adediran (living, Nigeria, nf)
- Niran Adedokun (born 1971, Nigeria, f)
- Mirza Adeeb (1914–1999, India/Pakistan, d/f)
- Yomi Adegoke (born 1991, England, f/nf)
- Arinpe Gbekelolu Adejumo (living, Nigeria, f/nf)
- Willem Adelaar (born 1948, Netherlands, nf)
- Debra Adelaide (born 1958, Australia, f/nf)
- Abimbola Adelakun (living, Nigeria, nf/f)
- Sunday Adelaja (living, Nigeria, nf)
- Fredrik Adelborg (1886–1948, Sweden, nf)
- Gustaf-Otto Adelborg (1883–1965, Sweden, nf)
- Remi Adeleke (living, US, f/nf)
- Samson Adetayo Adeleke (living, Nigeria/US, nf)
- Claude Adelen (born 1944, France, nf/p)
- Bisi Adeleye-Fayemi (born 1963, Nigeria/England, nf/p)
- Hojjat Adeli (born 1950, Nigeria/England, nf/p)
- Yves-Marie Adeline (born 1960, France, nf)
- Fariba Adelkhah (born 1959, Iran/France, nf)
- Vladislav Adelkhanov (born 1970, Georgia, f)
- Joan Elies Adell i Pitarch (born 1968, Spain, nf/p)
- Hallee Adelman (living, US, ch)
- Howard Adelman (1938-2023, Canada, nf)
- Irma Adelman (1930-2017, Romania/US, nf)
- Janet Adelman (1941-2010, US, nf)
- Jeremy Adelman (born 1960, Canada, nf)
- Paul Adelman (living, England, nf)
- Rachel Adelman (living, US, nf)
- Saul Adelman (born 1944, US, nf)
- Adelola Adeloye (1935-2021, Nigeria, nf)
- Claes Adelsköld (1824–1907, Sweden, nf)
- Karin Adelsköld (born 1973, Sweden, nf)
- Ulf Adelsohn (born 1941, Sweden, nf)
- Jake Adelstein (born 1969, US, nf)
- Jacques d'Adelswärd-Fersen (1880–1923, France, f/p)
- Viveka Adelswärd (born 1942, Sweden, nf)
- Johann Christoph Adelung (1732–1806, Germany, nf)
- Sophie von Adelung (1850–1927, Germany, f)
- Ndriçim Ademaj (born 1991, Kosovo, f/p)
- Amal Aden (born 1983, Somalia/Norway, f)
- Menno Aden (born 1942, Germany, nf)
- David Howard Adeney (1911–1994, England/US, nf)
- Richard Adeney (1920–2010, England, nf)
- Walter Frederic Adeney (1849–1920, England, nf)
- Sade Adeniran (born 1960s, England/Nigeria, f/nf)
- Olusegun Adeniyi (born 1965, Nigeria, nf)
- Ogechi Adeola (living, Nigeria, nf)
- Felix Aderca (1891–1962, Romania, f/p)
- D. M. Aderibigbe (born 1989, Nigeria/US, p)
- Maggie Aderin (born 1968, England, nf)
- Saheed Aderinto (born 1979, Nigeria/US, nf)
- Dawn Ades (born 1943, England, nf)
- Yemi Adesanya (living, Nigeria, p)
- Ilesanmi Adesida (born 1949, Nigeria, nf)
- O. C. Adesina (born 1964, Nigeria, nf)
- Akin Adesokan (living, Nigeria, nf)
- Toyin Adewale-Gabriel (born 1969, Nigeria, f/nf/p)
- Kunle Adewale (born 1981, Nigeria, f)
- Stephen Adewale (born 1982, Nigeria, nf)
- Roseline Adewuyi (living, Nigeria, nf)
- Tomi Adeyemi (born 1993, US, f)
- David Adger (born 1967, England, nf)
- Ahmed Adghirni (1947-2020, Morrocco, f)
- Hasmukh Adhia (born 1958, India, nf)
- Ankit Babu Adhikari (born 1991, Nepal, nf)
- Gangadhar Adhikari (1898–1981, India, nf)
- Krishna Lal Adhikari (1888–1923, Nepal, nf)
- Kshetra Pratap Adhikary (1943–2014, Nepal, p)
- Mohamed Adhikari (living, South Africa, nf)
- Parmanand Adhir (1939-2013, India, p)
- Hakim Adi (living, England, nf)
- Anne-Marie Adiaffi (1951-1994, Cote D'Ivoire, f)
- Jean-Marie Adiaffi (1941-1999, Cote D'Ivoire, f/nf/p)
- Mir Shamsuddin Adib-Soltani (1931-2023, Iran, nf)
- Majid Adibzadeh (born 1980, Iran, nf)
- Chimamanda Ngozi Adichie (born 1977, Nigeria, f/nf)
- Sandra Adickes (living, US, nf)
- Kate Adie (born 1945, England, nf)
- Aravind Adiga (born 1974, India, f)
- Gopalakrishna Adiga (1918–1992, India, p)
- Amina Adil (c.1930–2004, Canada, nf)
- Mona Adilman (1924–1991, Canada, p)
- Kaouther Adimi (born 1986, Algeria/France, f/nf)
- Akachi Adimora-Ezeigbo (living, Nigeria, ch/f/nf)
- Gabriele Adinolfi (born 1954, Italy, nf)
- Mario Adinolfi (born 1971, Italy, f/nf)
- Waziri Adio (born 1968, Nigeria, nf)
- Opal Palmer Adisa (born 1954, Jamaica, p/f)
- Halide Edib Adıvar (1884–1964, Turkey, f/nf)
- Pongpol Adireksarn (born 1942, Thailand, f)
- S. P. Adithanar (1905–1981, India, nf)
- Yogi Adityanath (born 1972, India, nf)
- Ehud Adiv (born 1946, Palestine/Israel, nf)
- Ichak Adizes (born 1937, North Macedonia, nf)
- Christine Adjahi (born 1945, Benin, f)
- Elvire Adjamonsi (born 1971, Benin, f)
- Nana Kwame Adjei-Brenyah (born 1991, US, f)
- Randell Adjei (born 1991, Canada, p)
- Eric Adjepong (born 1991, US, nf)
- David Adjey (living, Canada, nf)
- Zoe Adjonyoh (born 1977, England, nf)
- Mohammed ibn Adjurrum (1273–1323, Morocco, nf)
- A. W. H. Adkins (1929-1996, England, nf)
- Patrick H. Adkins (1948-2015, US, f)
- Lesley Adkins (born 1955, England, nf)
- Roy Adkins (born 1951, England, nf)
- Walter Scott Adkins (1890–1956, US, nf)
- Elizabeth Adkins-Regan (born 1945, US, nf)
- Charlie Adlard (born 1966, England, f)
- Mark Adlard (born 1932, England, f)
- Robert H. Adleman (1919–1995, US, f/nf)
- Alexandre Adler (1950–2023, France, nf)
- Alfred Adler (1870–1937, Austria-Hungary/Scotland, ch)
- Allen Adler (1916–1964, US, f)
- C. S. Adler (born 1932, US, ch)
- Cy A Adler (1927-2018, US, nf)
- Dahlia Adler (living, US, f)
- David A. Adler (born 1947, US, ch)
- Elizabeth Adler (born 1950, England, f)
- Elkan Nathan Adler (1861–1946, England, nf)
- Emma Adler (1858–1935, Austria, f)
- Frances Payne Adler (born 1942, US/Canada, f/p)
- Felix Adler (1851–1933, Germany/US, nf)
- Guido Adler (1855–1941, Austria, nf)
- Hans Adler (1880–1957, Germany, f/p)
- H. G. Adler (1910–1988, Czechoslovakia/England, d/f/p)
- Hans-Henning Adler (born 1949, Germany, nf)
- Helene Adler (1849–1923, Germany, nf/p)
- Irving Adler (1913–2012, US, nf)
- Jacob Adler (1874–1974, Austria-Hungary/US, f/p)
- Jacob O. Adler (1913–1999, US, nf)
- Janet Adler (1941–2023, US, nf)
- Jeremy Adler (born 1947, England, nf/p)
- Jerry Adler (1918–2010, US, nf)
- Jonathan Adler (born 1966, US, nf)
- Jonathan H. Adler (living, US, nf)
- Joyce Sparer Adler (1915–1999, US, nf)
- Julius Ochs Adler (1892–1955, US, nf)
- Larry Adler (1914–2001, US, nf)
- Laszlo Adler (born 1932, Hungary/US, nf)
- Laure Adler (born 1950, France, f/nf)
- Lee Adler (1926-2003, US, nf)
- Lindsay Adler (living, US, nf)
- Matthew Adler (born 1962, US, nf)
- Michael Adler (1868–1944, England, nf)
- Margot Adler (1946-2014, US, nf)
- María Raquel Adler (c. 1900–1974, Argentina, nf/p)
- Max Adler (1873–1937, Austria, nf)
- Nancy J. Adler (born 1948, US, nf)
- Nathan Adler (1911–1994, US, nf)
- Nathan Niigan Noodin Adler (living, Canada, f)
- Oskar Adler (1875–1955, Austria, nf)
- Patricia A. Adler (living, US, nf)
- Paul S. Adler (living, US, nf)
- Peggy Adler (born 1942, US, ch/f/nf)
- Rachel Adler (born 1943, US, nf)
- Renata Adler (born 1937, US, f/nf)
- Ruth Adler (1944-1994, England, nf)
- Solomon Adler (1909–1994, US, nf)
- Stephen J. Adler (born 1955, US, nf)
- Stephen L. Adler (born 1939, US, nf)
- Warren Adler (1927-2019, US, f/p)
- Nikolay Adlerberg (1819–1882, Russia, nf)
- Roland Adlerberth (1923–1993, Sweden, nf)
- Eufemia von Adlersfeld-Ballestrem (1854–1941, Germany, f)
- Linda Adler-Kassner (living, US, nf)
- Jussi Adler-Olsen (born 1950, Denmark, f)
- Carl August Adlersparre (1810–1862, Sweden, p)
- Yitzchok Adlerstein (born 1950, US, nf)
- Miquel Adlert i Noguerol (1911–1989, Spain, f)
- Miroslav Adlešič (1907–2002, Slovenia, nf)
- Lucy Adlington (born 1970, England, f/nf)
- Elijah Adlow (1896–1982, US, nf)
- Vishwa Adluri (living, Germany, nf)
- Amr El Adly (born 1970, Egypt, f/p)
- Rasha Adly (born 1976, Egypt, f/nf)
- Anat Admati (born 1956, Israel, nf)
- Thelma Admon (1950–2025, Israel, f)
- Vladimir Admoni (1909–1993, Soviet Union/Russia, nf/p)
- Einat Admony (born 1971, Israel/US, nf)
- Etel Adnan (1925-2021, Lebanon, f/nf/p)
- Yassin Adnan (born 1970, Morocco, f)
- Tappan Adney (1868–1950, US/Canada, f)
- Arnold Adoff (1935–2021, US, ch/f/nf)
- José Adolph (1933–2008, Germany/Peru, f)
- Karl Adolph (1869–1931, Austria, f)
- Wolfram Adolphi (born 1951, Germany, nf)
- Svenja Adolphs (living, England, nf)
- Mikael Adolphson (born 1961, Sweden, nf)
- Akosua Adoma Perbi (born 1952, Ghana, nf)
- Juozas Adomaitis-Šernas (1859–1922, Russia/US, nf)
- Hannes Adomeit (1942-2022, Germany, nf)
- Mantas Adomėnas (born 1972, Lithuania, f)
- George Adomian (1922–1996, US, nf)
- Paul Adomites (living, US, nf)
- Adomnán (c. 624–704, Ireland/Scotland, nf), also known as St Eunan
- Pilar Adón (born 1971, Spain, f)
- Judith Adong (born 1977, Uganda/US, d/ch)
- Adonis (born 1930, Syria/France, p)
- Andrew Adonis, Baron Adonis (born 1963, England, nf)
- Nicholas Adontz (1871–1942, Russia/Belgium, nf)
- Vladimir Adoratsky (1878–1945, Soviet Union, nf)
- Margit Adorf (born 1974, Estonia, p)
- Mario Adorf (1930–2026, Germany, f/nf)
- András Adorján (1950–2023, Hungary, nf)
- Alexandra Adornetto (born 1994, Australia, ch)
- Luisa Adorno (1921–2021, Italy, f/nf)
- Stanislas Spero Adotevi (1934–2024, Benin, nf)
- Jorge Elías Adoum (1897–1958, Ottoman Empire/Ecuador, nf)
- Jorge Enrique Adoum (1926–2009, Ecuador, p)
- James M. Adovasio (1944–2026, US, nf)
- Nizamuddin Asir Adrawi (1926–2021, India, nf)
- Albert Adrià (born 1969, Spain, nf)
- Ferran Adrià (born 1962, Spain, nf)
- Bette Adriaanse (born 1984, Netherlands, f/nf)
- Wilna Adriaanse (born 1958, South Africa, f)
- Hans Adriaansens (born 1946, Netherlands, nf)
- Charles R. Adrian (1922–2004, US, nf)
- Chris Adrian (born 1970, US, f)
- Edgar Adrian (1889–1977, England, nf)
- Götz Adriani (born 1940, Germany, nf)
- Isabelle Adriani (born 1972, Italy, ch/nf)
- Reni Adriano (living, Brazil, f)
- Sophie Adriansen (born 1982, France, ch/f/nf)
- Gladys Lucy Adshead (1896–1985, England, ch)
- Gwen Adshead (born 1960, England, nf)
- Herbert Bealey Adshead (1862–1932, Canada, nf)
- Joseph Adshead (1800–1861, England, nf)
- Kay Adshead (born 1954, England, p)
- Artur Adson (1889–1977, Russian E/Estonia, p/d/nf)
- Steve Adubato Jr. (living, US, nf)
- Bhumibol Adulyadej (1927-2016, Thailand, nf)
- Adunis (born 1930, Syria, p/nf), born Ali Ahmad Said Esber
- Javier Adúriz (1948-2011, Argentina, p)
- Deng Adut (born 1984, Sudan/Australia, nf)
- Kalyan Bulchand Advani (1911–1994, India, nf/p)
- L. K. Advani (born 1927, India, nf)
- Poornima Advani (living, India, nf)
- Abdel Jabbar Adwan (living, Palestine, f)
- Amina Al Adwan (born 1935, Jordan/US, p/nf)
- Mamdouh Adwan (1941-2004, Syria, f/p)
- Cecilia Mary Ady (1881–1958, England, nf)
- Endre Ady (1877–1919, Hungary, p)
- Julia Cartwright Ady (1851–1924, England, nf)
- Aravind Enrique Adyanthaya (born 1965, US, ch/d)
- Mariska Ady (1888–1977, Hungary, p)
- Adyashanti (born 1962, US, nf)
- Edem Adzaho (living, Ghana, nf)
- Gojko Adžić (living, Serbia, nf)

== Ae–Al ==
- Aeba Koson (饗庭篁村, 1855–1922, Japan, f/nf)
- Tania Aebi (born 1966, US, nf)
- Aelred of Rievaulx (1110–1167, England, nf)
- Franz Aepinus (1724–1802, Russian E, nf)
- Aeschines (389–314 BCE, Greece, nf)
- Aeschylus (c. 525/524 – c. 456/455 BCE, Greece, d)
- Aesop (c. 620 – 560 BCE, Greece, f)
- Anastasia Afanasieva (born 1982, Ukraine, p/f)
- Þórhildur Sunna Ævarsdóttir (born 1987, nf)
- Max Afford (1906–1954, Australia, d/f)
- Ali Mohammad Afghani (born 1925, Iran, f/nf)
- S. A. Afolabi (born 1966, Nigeria, f)
- Lucius Afranius (fl. early 1st c. BCE, Rome, p)
- Maxamed Daahir Afrax (living, Somalia, f/d/nf)
- Leo Africanus (1488–1554, Al-Andalus, nf)
- Tatamkhulu Afrika (1920–2002, Egypt/S Africa, f/p/nf), pseudonym of Ismail Joubert
- Sa'ida Bint Khatir al-Farisi (born 1956), Omani poet
- John Agard (born 1949, British Guiana/Guyana, d/p/ch)
- Chandrashekhar Agashe (1888–1956, India, nf)
- Mandar Agashe (born 1969, India, p)
- Sheetal Agashe (born 1977, India, p)
- Shimon Agassi (1852–1914, Mesopotamia, nf)
- Louis Agassiz (1807–1873, Switzerland/US, nf)
- Hiroyuki Agawa (阿川弘之, 1920–2015, Japan, f/nf)
- Patience Agbabi (born 1965, England, p)
- Berthe-Evelyne Agbo (living, Benin/France, p)
- Francis Agbodeka (1931–2005, Gold Coast/Ghana, nf)
- James Agee (1909–1955, US, f/nf/p)
- Deborah Ager (born 1978, US, p/nf)
- Anna Caspari Agerholt (1892–1943, Norway, nf)
- Pedro Agerre (1566–1654, Spain, nf)
- Sven Aggesen (born c. 1140/1150, Denmark, nf)
- Ifeoma Aggrey-Fynn (1980–2015, Nigeria, nf)
- István Ágh (1938–2025, Hungary, p), pseudonym of István Nagy
- Zechariah Aghmati (1120–1195, Morocco, nf)
- Maria Gaetana Agnesi (1718–1799, Italy, nf)
- Pinky Agnew (born 1955, N Zealand, d/nf/p)
- Shmuel Yosef Agnon (1888–1970, Austria-Hungary/Israel)
- Kelli Russell Agodon (born 1969, US, p)
- Dritëro Agolli (1931–2017, Albania, p/f)
- Georg Andreas Agricola (1672–1738, Germany, nf)
- Rodolphus Agricola (1443/1444–1485, Netherlands, nf/p)
- Heinrich Cornelius Agrippa (1486–1535, Holy Roman E/France, nf)
- José Eduardo Agualusa (born 1960, Angola/Mozambique, f/p)
- Brígida Agüero (1837–1866, Cuban, p)
- João Aguiar (1943–2010, Portugal, f/nf)
- Grace Aguilar (1816–1847, England/Germany, f/p/nf)
- Luis Aguilar-Monsalve (born 1942, Ecuador, f/nf)
- Marcos Aguinis (born 1935, Argentina, nf)
- Delmira Agustini (1886–1914, Uruguay, p)
- Bogi Ágústsson (born 1952, Iceland, nf)
- Jot Agyeman (born 1967, Ghana, nf/d)
- Ivor Agyeman-Duah (born 1966, Ghana, nf)
- Ah Cheng (鍾阿城, born 1949, China, d/f)
- Cecelia Ahern (born 1981, Ireland, f)
- Jerry Ahern (1946–2012, US, f/nf)
- Alf Ahlberg (1892–1979, Sweden, nf)
- Lars Ahlin (1915–1997, Sweden, f)
- Farrukh Ahmad (1918–1974, India/Bangladesh, p/ch)
- Ishtiaq Ahmad (1941–2015, India/Pakistan, f/nf)
- Malik Zahoor Ahmad (living, Pakistan, nf)
- Najiba Ahmad (born 1954, Iraq, p/f)
- Shahnon Ahmad (1933–2017, Malaya/Malaysia, f)
- Abdel Rahim Ahmed (living, Egypt, d)
- Ashfaq Ahmed (1925–2004, India/Pakistan, f/d)
- Humayun Ahmed (1948–2012, E Pakistan/Bangladesh, f/d/nf)
- Kazi Anis Ahmed (born 1970, Bangladesh, nf/f)
- Leila Ahmed (born 1940, Egypt/US, nf)
- Mohammed Taha Mohammed Ahmed (1965–2006, Sudan, nf)
- Mouna-Hodan Ahmed (born 1972, Djibouti, f)
- Ahmet Vefik Paşa (1823–1891, Turkey, nf/d)
- Abul Mansur Ahmad (1898–1979, India/Bangladesh, f/nf)
- Shaykh Ahmad (1753–1826, Hijaz, nf), in full Ahmad bin Zayn al-Dín bin Ibráhím al-Ahsá'í
- Jasmina Ahmetagić (born 1970, Yugoslavia/Serbia, nf/p)
- Astrid Ahnfelt (1876–1962, Sweden, f)
- Juhani Aho (1861–1921, Russian E/Finland, f), born Johannes Brofeldt
- Syed Ali Ahsan (1922–2002, India/Bangladesh, p/nf)
- Alfred Aho (born 1941, Canada, nf)
- Jeannette D. Ahonsou (born 1954, Togo, f)
- Ai (1847–1910, US, p), born Florence Anthony
- Ai Qing (艾青, 1910–1996, China, p)
- Mohamed Aïchaoui (1921–1959, Algeria, nf)
- Ilse Aichinger (1921–2016, Austria, nf/f/p)
- Robert Aickman (1914–1981, England, f/nf)
- Ama Ata Aidoo (1940–2023, Gold Coast/Ghana, f/nf/p)
- Kofi Aidoo (born 1950s, Gold Coast/Ghana, f)
- Naja Marie Aidt (born 1963, Denmark, p/f)
- Shō Aikawa (會川昇, born 1965, Japan, f)
- Conrad Aiken (1899–1973, US, p/f)
- Joan Aiken (1924–2004, England, f/ch)
- John Aikin (1747–1822, England, nf)
- Lucy Aikin (1781–1864, England, nf)
- Aganice Ainianos (1838–1892, Greece, p)
- Alfred Ainger (1837–1904, England, nf)
- Hew Ainslie (1792–1878, Scotland/US, p/nf)
- Henry Ainsworth (1571–1622, England, nf)
- Ruth Ainsworth (1908–1984, England, ch/d)
- William Harrison Ainsworth (1805–1882, England, f)
- César Aira (born 1949, Argentina, f/nf)
- Catherine Aird (born 1930, England, f)
- Aa'isha bint Ahmad al-Qurtubiyya (died 1010), Andalusia, p)
- Jean Aitchison (born 1938, England, nf)
- Adam Aitken (born 1960, England/Australia, p)
- Aizu Yaichi (会津八一, 1881–1956, Japan, p/nf)
- Tolu Ajayi (born 1946, Nigeria, p/nf)
- Dejan Ajdačić (born 1959, Yugoslavia/Ukraine, nf)
- Ahmad ibn Ajiba (1747–1809, Morocco, nf/p)
- Yemi Ajibade (1929–2013, Nigeria/England, d)
- Audrey Ajose (born c. 1937, Nigeria, nf/ch)
- Jófríður Ákadóttir (born 1994, Iceland, p)
- Baku Akae (赤江瀑, 1933–2012, Japan, f)
- Jirō Akagawa (赤川次郎, born 1948, Japan, f)
- Satoru Akahori (あかほりさとる, born 1965, Japan, f)
- Lotfi Akalay (1943–2019, Tangier/Morocco, nf/f)
- John Akar (1927–1975, Sierra Leone, nf)
- Akazome Emon (赤染衛門, late 950s/early 960s – 1041 or later, Japan, p/nf)
- Hyder Akbar (born 1984, Pakistan/US, nf)
- Ahmad Akbarpour (born 1970, Iran, f/ch)
- Yusuf Akcura (1876–1935, Turkey, nf)
- Mikalojus Akelaitis (1829–1887, Russian E/France, nf)
- Grace Akello (born 1950, Uganda, p/nf)
- Jan van Aken (born 1961, Netherlands, f)
- Mark Akenside (1721–1770, England, p)
- Mohammed Akensus (1797–1877, Morocco, nf)
- John Yonge Akerman (1806–1873, England, nf)
- Rachel Akerman (1522–1544, Austria/Moravia, p)
- Sonja Åkesson (1926–1977, Sweden, p)
- Lucy Akhurst (born 1970, England, d)
- Bella Akhmadulina (1937–2010, USSR/Russia, p/f)
- Anna Akhmatova (1889–1966, Russian E/USSR, p)
- Jan Nisar Akhtar (1914–1976, Russia E/USSR, p)
- Javed Akhtar (born 1945, India, p/d/nf)
- Salman Akhtar (born 1946, India/US, nf)
- Shaheen Akhtar (born 1962, E Pakistan/Bangladesh, f/nf)
- Tolu Akinyemi (living, Nigeria, p)
- Mizuhito Akiyama (秋山瑞人, born 1971, Japan, f)
- Akiyuki Nosaka (野坂昭如, 1930–2015, Japan, f/p)
- Kofi Akpabli (born 1973, Ghana, nf)
- Uwem Akpan (born 1971, Nigeria/US, f/nf)
- Mirko Aksentijević (1922–2011, Yugoslavia/Serbia, nf)
- Ryūnosuke Akutagawa (芥川龍之介, 1892–1927, Japan, f)
- Ahmad ibn Munim al-Abdari (died 1228, Andalusia, nf)
- Muhammad Aladdin (born 1979, Egypt, f/d)
- Ismail ibn al-Ahmar (1387–1406, Morocco, nf)
- William Alabaster (1567–1640, England, p/d/nf)
- Alcaeus of Mytilene (c. 625/620 – c. 580 BCE, Greece, p)
- Raabi'a al-Adwiyya (714–801, Arabic region, p)
- Anne-Marie Albiach (1937–2012), French poet and translator
- Tunku Zain Al-'Abidin (born 1982, Malaysia, nf)
- Ahmed Alaidy (born 1974, Egypt, d/p)
- Gamila El Alaily (1907–1991, Egypt, p/f)
- Laila al-Akhyaliyya (died 694–709, Arab region, p)
- Idriss ibn al-Hassan al-Alami (1925–2007, Morocco, p)
- Luigi Alamanni (1495–1556, Italy, p)
- Harutyun Alamdaryan (1795–1834, Russian E, p/nf)
- Mohammed ibn al-Tayyib al-Alami (died 1722, Morocco, nf)
- Mohammed ibn al-Tayyib al-Alami (1698–1756, Morocco, nf)
- Mohammed ibn Mohammed Alami (1932–1993, Morocco, p)
- Mohammed ibn Idris al-Amrawi (1794–1847, Morocco, p)
- Mubarkah Bent al-Barra (born 1957, Mauritania, p/ch)
- Eva Allen Alberti (1856–1938, US, nf/d)
- Alcman (fl. 7th c. BCE, Greece, p)
- Francesco Algarotti (1712–1764, Italy, nf/p)
- Salma Khalil Alio (born 1982, Chad, p)
- Anacreon (c. 582 – c. 485 BCE, Greece, p)
- Anaxagoras (c. 500 – c. 428 BCE, Greece, nf)
- Anaximander (c. 610 – c. 546 BCE, Greece, nf)
- Anaximenes of Miletus (c. 586 – c. 526 BCE, Greece, nf)
- Andocides (c. 440 – c. 390 BCE, Greece, nf)
- Nadia Anjuman (1980–2005, Afghanistan, p)
- Süreyya Aylin Antmen (born 1981, Turkey, nf/p)
- Wani Ardy (born 1984, Malaysia, p/nf)
- Kaddour El Alamy (1742–1850, Morocco, p)
- Alaol (1607–1680, Bengal, p)
- Abbas Mahmoud al-Aqqad (1889–1964, Egypt, p/nf)
- Daniel Alarcón (born 1977, Peru, f/nf)
- Juan Ruiz de Alarcón (c. 1581–1639, Mexico, d)
- Taqiyya Umm Ali bint Ghaith ibn Ali al-Armanazi (1111–1183/1184, Arab region, p), Sitt al-Ni'm
- Leopoldo Alas (1852–1901, Spain, f/nf)
- Alasdair mac Mhaighstir Alasdair (c. 1698–1770, Scotland, p/nf)
- Syed Hussein Alatas (1928–2007, Malaya/Malaysia, nf)
- Alev Alatlı (born 1944, Turkey, nf/f)
- Ali ibn al-Athir (1160–1233, Mesopotamia/Iraq, nf)
- Bozorg Alavi (1904–1997, Iran/Germany, f/nf)
- Ave Alavainu (born 1942, Estonia, p)
- Bozorg Alavi (1904–1997, Iran/Germany, nf/f)
- Alauddin Al-Azad (1932–2009, India/Bangladesh, f/p/d)
- Abu al-Abbas al-Azafi (1162–1236, Ceuta, nf)
- Nura al-Badi (born 1969, Oman, p)
- Abd al-Haqq al-Badisi (died post-1322, Morocco, nf)
- Safiyya al-Baghdadiyya (fl. 12th c., Arab region, p)
- David Albahari (born 1948, Yugoslavia/Canada, f)
- Gillebríghde Albanach (fl. 1200–1230, Scotland, p)
- Za'ima Sulayman al-Baruni (1910–1976, Libya, f/nf)
- Edward Albee (1928–2016, US, d)
- Albert of Aix (fl. c. 1100, Holy Roman E, nf)
- Albertus Magnus (c. 1200–1280, Duchy of Bavaria/Holy Roman E, nf)
- Susan Wittig Albert (born 1940, US, f)
- Pierre Albert-Birot (1876–1967, France, p/d)
- Anne-Marie Albiach (1937–2012, France, p)
- Jordie Albiston (1961–2022, Australia, p)
- Albrecht von Johansdorf (c. 1180 – c. 1209, Germany, p)
- Vera Albreht (1895–1971, Austrian E/Yugoslavia, p/nf)
- Madeleine Albright (1937–2022, US, nf)
- Mitch Albom (born 1958, US, f/nf)
- Aurora de Albornoz (1926–1990), Spain, p/nf)
- Enrique López Albújar (1872–1966, Peru, p)
- Al-Buzidi al-Bujrafi (1925–2011, Morocco, p)
- Afonso de Albuquerque (c. 1453–1515, Portugal, nf)
- Anthony the Great (251–356, Greece, nf)
- Ayaan Hirsi Ali (born 1969, Somalia/US, nf)
- Maram al-Masri (born 1962), Syrian/French poet and writer
- Fatima al-Taytun (born 1962), Bahrain poet
- Elizabeth Alexander (born 1962), American poet, essayist, playwright and academic
- Alcaeus (fl. 4th c. BCE, Athens, p/d)
- Alcaeus of Messene (fl. 219–196 BCE, Greece, p)
- Alcaeus of Mytilene (c. 625/620 – c. 580 BCE, Lesbos, p)
- Ammiel Alcalay (born 1956, US, p/nf)
- Baltasar del Alcázar (1530–1606, Spain, p)
- Alcman (fl. 7th c. BCE, Sparta, p)
- Vivien Alcock (1924–2003, England, ch)
- Mariana Alcoforado (1640–1723, Portugal, nf)
- Amos Bronson Alcott (1799–1888, US, nf)
- Louisa May Alcott (1832–1888, US, ch/f, p)
- Alcuin (c. 735–804, England/France, nf/p)
- Kaye Aldenhoven (living, Australia, p)
- Naomi Alderman (born 1974, England, f)
- Hugh Aldersey-Williams (born 1959, England, nf)
- Maggie Alderson (born 1959, England/Australia, f/nf)
- Thomas Aldham (c. 1616–1660, England, nf)
- Richard Aldington (1892–1962, England, f/nf/p)
- Brian Aldiss (1925–2017, England, f)
- Ahmad al-Tayyeb Aldj (1928–2012, Morocco, p/d)
- Henry Aldrich (1647–1710, England, nf)
- Nelson W. Aldrich (1841–1915, US, nf)
- James Aldridge (1918–2015, Australia/England, f/nf/ch)
- Radu Aldulescu (novelist) (born 1954, Romania, f)
- Jalal Al-e-Ahmad (1923–1969, Iran, f/nf)
- Léonard Aléa (18th-century–1812, France, nf)
- Vasile Alecsandri (1821–1890, Moldavia/Romania, p/d)
- Mira Alečković (1924–2008, Yugoslavia/Serbia, p)
- Tudur Aled (c. 1465–1525, Wales, p)
- Caetano da Costa Alegre (1864–1890, São Tomé and Príncipe, p)
- Manuel Alegre (born 1936, Portugal, p/nf)
- Ciro Alegría (1909–1967, Peru, nf/f)
- Claribel Alegría (1924–2018, Nicaragua/Salvador, p/nf/f)
- Fernando Alegría (1918–2005, Chile, p/nf)
- Vicente Aleixandre (1898–1984, Spain, p)
- Josip Murn Aleksandrov (1879–1901, Austria-Hungary, p)
- Haddis Alemayehu (1910–2003, Ethiopia, f/nf)
- Jean le Rond d'Alembert (1717–1783, France, nf)
- José de Alencar (1829–1877, Brazil, f/d/nf)
- Rochelle Alers (born 1963, US, f), pseudonyms Susan James and Rena McLeary
- Andrés J. d'Alessio (1940–2009, Argentina, nf)
- Arnold Aletrino (1858–1916, Netherlands, nf)
- Bernhard Alexander (1850–1927, Hungary, nf)
- Horace Alexander (1889–1989, England/US, nf)
- Kate Alexander, pseudonym of Tilly Armstrong (1927–2010, England, f)
- Kwame Alexander (born 1968, US, p/ch)
- Lloyd Alexander (1924–2007, US, ch/f)
- Miriam Alexander (1879 – post-1924, England, f)
- Sue Alexander (1932–2008, US, ch/nf)
- Trisha Alexander, pseudonym of Patricia Kay (born 1937, US, f)
- Grigore Alexandrescu (1810–1885, Wallachia/Romania, p)
- Larisa Alexandrovna Horton (born 1971, USSR/US, nf/p)
- Ioan Alexandru (1941–2000, Romania/Germany, p/nf)
- Sherman Alexie (born 1966, US, f/p)
- Elena Alexieva (born 1975, Bulgaria, p/f)
- Abelardo Díaz Alfaro (1916–1999, Puerto Rico, f/nf)
- Ahmad ibn Idris al-Fasi (1760–1837, Morocco, nf)
- David ben Abraham al-Fasi (fl. 10th c., Morocco, nf)
- Hamdun ibn al-Hajj al-Fasi (1760–1817, Morocco, nf)
- Isaac Alfasi (1013–1103, Algeria, nf)
- Mohammed al-Arbi al-Fasi (1580–1642, Morocco, nf)
- Mohammed ibn Zakri al-Fasi (died 1731, Morocco, nf/p)
- Allal al-Fassi (1910–1974, Morocco, nf/p)
- Malika al-Fassi (1919–2007, Morocco, nf/d/f)
- Felipe Alfau (1902–1999, Spain/US, f/p)
- Muhammad al-Fayturi (1936–2015, Sudan/Morocco, p/d/nf)
- Pierre Alféri (born 1963, France, f/p)
- Alfredo Armas Alfonzo (born 1990, Venezuela, nf/f)
- Mohammed al-Habib al-Fourkani (1922–2008, Morocco, nf/p)
- Hans Alfredson (1931–2017, Sweden, f)
- Horatio Alger (1832–1899, US, ch)
- John Goldworth Alger (1836–1907, England, nf)
- Muhammad Asadullah Al-Ghalib (born 1948, E Pakistan/Bangladesh, nf)
- Abd al-Aziz al-Ghumari (1920–1997, Tangier, nf)
- Abdullah al-Ghumari (1910–1993, Tangier, nf)
- Ahmad al-Ghumari (1902–1961, Morocco/Egypt, nf)
- Gamal al-Ghitani (1945–2015, Egypt, f/nf)
- Nelson Algren (1909–1981, US, f/nf/p)
- Muhammad Ibn al-Habib (1876–1972, Morocco, nf)
- Tawfiq al-Hakim (1898–1987, Egypt, f/d)
- Ahmad ibn Hamdun ibn al-Hajj (died 1898, Morocco, nf)
- al-Ḥujayjah, (Safīyah bint Tha'labah al-Shaybānīyah, 5th – 6th c.), Arab region, p)
- al-Ḥurqah (5th – 6th c.), Arab region, p)
- Abdullah Yusuf Ali (1872–1953, India/England, nf)
- Agha Shahid Ali (1949–2001, India/US, p)
- Ahmed Ali (1910–1994, India/Pakistan)
- Ayaan Hirsi Ali (born 1969, Somalia/US, nf)
- Bachtyar Ali (born 1960, USSR/Germany, f/nf/p)
- Hauwa Ali (born 1995, Nigeria, f)
- Idris Ali (1940–2010, Egypt, f)
- Monica Ali (born 1967, E Pakistan/England, f)
- Mohammed Naseehu Ali (born 1971, Ghana/US, f/nf)
- Shawkat Ali (1936–2018, India/Bangladesh, f)
- Sabahattin Ali (1907–1948, Ottoman E/Turkey, f/p/nf)
- Syed Ameer Ali (1849–1928, India/England, nf)
- Syed Mujtaba Ali (1904–1974, India/Bangladesh, nf)
- Taha Muhammad Ali (1931–2011, Palestine/Israel
- Tariq Ali (born 1943, India/England, nf)
- Mohammed al-Idrisi (1099–1165, Ceuta/Sicily, nf)
- Abel Alier (born 1933, Sudan, nf)
- Mohammed al-Ifrani (1670–1745), Morocco, nf)
- Dante Alighieri (c. 1265–1321, Italy, p)
- Bisera Alikadić (born 1939), Yugoslavia, p/nf)
- Yousef Alikhani (born 1975, Iran, f/nf/ch)
- Cyril Alington (1872–1955, England, f/nf/p)
- Margaret Alington (1920–2012, N Zealand, nf)
- Salma Khalil Alio (born 1982, Chad, p/f)
- Kavisekhara Dr Umar Alisha (1885–1945, India, nf)
- Archibald Alison (1757–1839, England, nf)
- Sir Archibald Alison, 1st Baronet (1792–1867, England/Scotland, nf)
- Jane Alison (born 1961, Australia, f/nf)
- Rosie Alison (born 1964, England, f/d)
- William Alison (1790–1859, Scotland, nf)
- Akilu Aliyu (1918–1999, Nigeria, p/nf)
- Ghazaleh Alizadeh (1949–1996, Iran, f/p)
- Sonita Alizadeh (born 1996, Afghanistan/US, p)
- Mohammed Abed al-Jabri (1935–2010, Morocco, nf)
- Adnan al-Janabi (living, Iraq, nf)
- Zaynab Alkali (born 1950, Nigeria, f)
- Ibn al-Khabbaza (died 1239, Morocco, nf/p)
- al-Khansa (575–645, Arab region, p)
- Tewfik Allal (born 1947, Morocco, nf)
- James Alexander Allan (1879–1967, Australia, p/nf)
- Mabel Esther Allan (1915–1998, England, ch)
- Rob Allan (1945–2021, N Zealand, p)
- Rosetta Allan (living, N Zealand, p/f)
- Hortense Allart (1801–1879, Italy/France, nf/f)
- Donald Allchin (1930–2010, England, nf)
- August Alle (1890–1952, Russian E/Estonia, nf/p)
- Joseph Alleine (1634–1668, England, nf)
- Barbara Allen (1914–1986, England, f), pseudonym of Violet Vivian Finlay Stuart Mann
- Candace Allen (born 1950, US, f/nf)
- Charlotte Vale Allen (born 1941, Canada/US, f)
- Chris Allen (born 1964, Australia, f)
- Clifford Allen, 1st Baron Allen of Hurtwood (1889–1939, England/Switzerland, nf)
- Dick Allen (1939–2017, US, p/nf)
- Donald Allen (1912–2004, US, p)
- Elizabeth Allen (living, Australia, p)
- Elizabeth Akers Allen (1832–1911, US, p/nf)
- Grant Allen (1848–1899, Canada/England, nf/f)
- Hannah Allen (c. 1638–1668 or 1708, England, nf)
- John Allen (1771–1843, Scotland/England, nf)
- John Allen (1771–1839, England, nf)
- Leslie Holdsworth Allen (1879–1964, Australia, p/ch)
- Mabel Esther Allan (1915–1998, England, ch)
- Mary Sophia Allen (1878–1964, Wales/England, nf)
- Pamela Allen (born 1934, N Zealand, ch)
- Richard James Allen (born 1960, Australia, p/f)
- Roger MacBride Allen (born 1957, US, f)
- Ron Allen (1947–2010, US, p/d)
- Thomas Allen (1681–1755, England, nf)
- Thomas B. Allen (1929–2018, US, f/nf)
- Walter Allen (1911–1995, England, nf/f)
- Isabel Allende (born 1942, Chile/US, f/nf)
- Ellen Palmer Allerton (1835–1893, US, p)
- Richard Allestree (1621/1622–1681, England, nf)
- Artur Alliksaar (1923–1966, Estonia/USSR, p)
- Margery Allingham (1904–1966, England, f)
- William Allingham (1824–1889, Ireland, p/nf)
- Hermann Allmers (1821–1902, Germany, p)
- Abdelkader Alloula (1939–1994, Algeria, d)
- Malek Alloula (1937–2015, Algeria, p/nf)
- Chris Van Allsburg (born 1949, US, ch)
- Aaron Allston, (1960–2014, US, f)
- Washington Allston (1779–1843, US, p/nf)
- Lisa Allen-Agostini (born 1970s, Trinidad, f/nf/p)
- Ahmed al-Madini (born 1947, Morocco, nf/f/p)
- Sadiq al-Mahdi (1935–2020, Sudan, nf)
- Nazik Al-Malaika (1923–2007, Iraq, p)
- Arib al-Ma'muniyya (797–890, Arab region, p)
- Ahmed Mohammed al-Maqqari (1578–1632, Algeria/Egypt, nf)
- Ibn al-Banna al-Marrakushi (1256–1321, Morocco, nf)
- Maram al-Masri (born 1962, Syria/France, p/nf)
- Anchan (born 1952, Thailand/US, p/f)
- Maya Angelou (1928–2014, US, nf/p)
- Helena Anhava (1925–2018, Finland, p)
- Elizabeth Alexander (born 1962), American poet, essayist, playwright and academic
- Maram al-Masri (born 1962), Syrian poet
- Elvia Ardalani (born 1963), Mexican poet, writer, and storyteller
- György Almásy (1867–1933, Hungary, nf)
- László Almásy (1895–1951, Austria-Hungary/Austria, nf)
- Øystein Alme (born 1960, Norway, nf)
- E. M. Almedingen (1898–1971, Russian E/England, f/nf/ch)
- Germano Almeida (born 1945, Cape Verde, nf/f)
- Guilherme de Almeida (1890–1969, Brazil, nf/p)
- Lúcia Machado de Almeida (1910–2005, Brazil, f)
- Manuel Antônio de Almeida (1831–1861, Brazil, f/d)
- Marcelina Almeida (c. 1830–1880), Argentina/Uruguay, f/p)
- Miguel Vale de Almeida (born 1960, Portugal, nf)
- Rita Almeida (born 1974, Portugal/US, nf)
- David Almond (born 1951, England, ch)
- Steve Almond (born 1966, US, f/nf)
- Carl Jonas Love Almqvist (1793–1866, Sweden, p/nf)
- Malik ibn al-Murahhal (1207–1289, Morocco, p)
- Wallada bint al-Mustakfi (1001–1080, Andalusia, p)
- Hamed al-Nazir (born 1975, Sudan, nf/f)
- Finn Alnæs (1932–1991, Norway, f)
- Karsten Alnæs (born 1938, Norway, nf)
- Mohammad Ishaq Aloko (born 1935, Afghanistan/Germany, nf)
- Dámaso Alonso (1898–1990, Spain, p/nf)
- Faouzia Aloui (born 1957, Tunisia, p/f)
- Blanche d'Alpuget (born 1944, Australia, f/nf)
- Muhammad Sa'id al-Qaddal (1935–2008, Sudan, nf)
- Ahmad Ibn al-Qadi (1552/1553–1616, Morocco, f/nf)
- Ibn al-Qattan (fl. 13th c., Morocco, nf)
- Zakariya al-Qazwini (1203–1273, Persia, nf)
- Al-Saddiq Al-Raddi (born 1969, Sudan, p/nf)
- Harun al-Rashid (763 or 766–809, Abbasid Caliphate, nf)
- Karim Alrawi (born 1952, Egypt, d/ch/f)
- Maqbula al-Shalak (1921–1986), Syria, p/ch)
- Hanan al-Shaykh (born 1945, Lebanon, f/nf)
- Ahmad ibn al-Amin al-Shinqiti (1872–1913, Mauritania, nf)
- Fawziyya al-Sindi (born 1957, Bahrain, p)
- Amir Taj al-Sir (born 1960, Sudan/Qatar, f/p/nf)
- Vincent Alsop (c. 1630–1703, England, nf)
- Alta (1942–2024, US, p/nf)
- Ignacio Manuel Altamirano (1834–1893, Mexico/Italy, f/nf)
- Fatima al-Taytun (born 1962, Bahrain, p)
- Steve Alten (born 1959, US, f)
- Peter Altenberg (1859–1919, Austrian E, f/p)
- Nathan Alterman (1910–1970, Poland/Israel, p/d/nf)
- Louis Althusser (1918–1990, France, nf)
- Ahmad al-Tifashi (1184–1253, Algeria/Egypt, p/nf)
- Fouad al-Tikerly (1927–2008, Iraq/Jordan, f)
- Ahmad Baba al-Timbukti (1556–1627, Mali, nf)
- Günter Altner (1936–2011, Germany, nf)
- Joseph Alexander Altsheler (1862–1919, US, f/nf)
- Mor Altshuler (born 1957, Israel, nf)
- Hassan Al-Turabi (1932–2016, Sudan, nf)
- T. M. Aluko (1918–2010, Nigeria, f/nf)
- Alurista (born 1947, Mexico/US, p)
- Julia Alvarez (born 1950, Dominica/US, p/f/nf)
- Al Alvarez (1929–2019, England, p/f/nf)
- Ivy Alvarez (living, Philippines/Australia, p)
- Juan Álvarez (1878–1954, Argentina, nf)
- Julia Alvarez (born 1950, US, p/f/nf)
- Betti Alver (1906–1989, Russian E/Estonia, p)
- Castro Alves (1847–1871, Brazil, p/d)
- Moniza Alvi (born 1954, Pakistan/England, p)
- Ibn al-Wannan (died 1773, Morocco, p)
- Tuhami al-Wazzani (1903–1972, Morocco, nf)
- Ibn al-Yasamin (died 1204, Seville, nf)
- Marc Alyn (born 1937, France, p), pseudonym of Alain-Marc Fécherolle
- Latifa al-Zayyat (1923–1996, Egypt, f)

== Am–An ==
- Mario Amadeo (1911–1983, Argentina, nf)
- Jorge Amado (1912–2001, Brazil, f)
- Ramón Amaya Amador (1916–1966, Honduras, nf)
- Elechi Amadi (1934–2016, Nigeria, d/f)
- Ifi Amadiume (born 1947, Nigeria/US, p/nf)
- Jorge Amado (1912–2001, Brazil, f)
- Andrej Amalrik (1938–1980, USSR/France, nf)
- Joseph Godson Amamoo (born 1931, Gold Coast/Ghana, nf)
- Ludu Daw Amar (1915–2008, Burma/Myanmar, nf)
- Ana Luísa Amaral (born 1956, Portugal, p/ch/nf)
- Gunadasa Amarasekara (born 1929, Ceylon/Sri Lanka, f/p/d)
- Amara-siṃha (fl. c. 375 CE, India, p/nf)
- Guru Amardas (1479–1574, India, nf)
- Orlanda Amarílis (1924–2014, Cape Verde, f/ch)
- Michael Daniel Ambatchew (1967–2012, Ethiopia, ch)
- Ingvar Ambjørnsen (1956–2025, Norway, f)
- Eric Ambler (1909–1998, England, f)
- Catherine d'Amboise (1475–1550, France, p)
- Stephen E. Ambrose (1936–2002, US, nf)
- William Ambrose (1813–1873, Wales, p/nf)
- Ambroise (fl. c. 1190, Normandy, p)
- Zoltán Ambrus (1861–1932, Hungary, nf/f)
- Ellis Amburn (1933–2018, US, nf)
- Erik Amdrup (1923–1998, Denmark, nf/f)
- Jean Améry (1912–1978, Austria, nf)
- Joseph Ames (1689–1759, England, nf)
- Nicholas Amhurst (1697–1743, England, p/nf)
- Yehuda Amichai (1924–2000, Germany/Israel, p), birth name Ludwig Pfeuffer
- Edmondo De Amicis (1846–1908, Italy, f/p/ch)
- Alexander Amilakhvari (1750–1802, Russian E, nf)
- Gad Ami (born 1958, Togo, f)
- Adibah Amin (born 1936, Malaya/Malaysia, f/d)
- Samir Amin (1931–2018, Egypt/France, nf)
- Chabua Amirejibi (1921–2013, USSR/Georgia, f)
- Reza Amirkhani (born 1973, Iran, f/nf)
- Mahshid Amirshahi (born 1937, Iran/France, f/nf)
- Indran Amirthanayagam (born 1960, Ceylon/US, p/nf)
- Kingsley Amis (1922–1995, England, f, p, nf)
- Martin Amis (1949–2023, England, f/nf)
- Majeed Amjad (1914–1974, India/Pakistan, p)
- Anton Wilhelm Amo (c. 1703 – c. 1759, Gold Coast/Germany, nf)
- A. R. Ammons (1926–2001, US, p/nf)
- Pita Amor (1918–2000, Mexico, p)
- Gabriele Amorth (1925–2016, Italy, nf)
- Alan Amory (living, South Africa, nf)
- Thomas Amory (c. 1691–1788, Ireland/England, nf)
- Sheldon Amos (1835–1886, England/Egypt, nf)
- André-Marie Ampère (1775–1836, France, nf)
- Mohammed Ibn Amr (died 1827, Morocco, p)
- Djamel Amrani (1935–2005, Algeria, nf)
- Idriss al-Amraoui (died 1879, Morocco, nf/p)
- Jean Amrouche (1906–1962, Algeria/France, p)
- Taos Amrouche (1913–1976, Algeria/France, f/p)
- Moses Amyraut (1596–1664, France, nf)
- Anacreon (c. 582 – c. 485 BCE, Asia Minor, p)
- Tahmima Anam (born 1975, Bangladesh/England, f)
- Anurag Anand (born 1978, India, f/nf)
- Mulk Raj Anand (1905–2004, India)
- Valerie Anand (born 1937, England, f)
- David Ananou (1917–2000, Togo, f)
- Dragutin Anastasijević (1877–1950, Serbia/Yugoslavia, nf)
- Rudolfo Anaya (1937–2020, US, f/p)
- Nicolas Ancion (born 1971, Belgium, f/ch/d)
- Manuel Ancízar (1812–1882, Colombia, nf)
- Federico Andahazi (born 1963, Argentina, f/nf)
- John Anderdon (1792–1874, England, nf)
- Alfred Andersch (1914–1980, Germany/Switzerland, nf)
- Astrid Hjertenæs Andersen (1915–1985, Norway, p/nf)
- Hans Christian Andersen (1805–1875, Denmark, ch)
- Susan Andersen (born 1950, US, f)
- Tryggve Andersen (1866–1920, Norway, f/p)
- Vilhelm Andersen (1864–1953, Denmark, nf)
- Adam Anderson (1692 or 1693–1765, Scotland, nf)
- Alan Orr Anderson (1879–1958, Scotland, nf)
- Barbara Anderson (1926–2013, N Zealand, f)
- Benedict Anderson (1936–2015, China/Indonesia, nf)
- Catherine Anderson (born 1948, US, f)
- Elizabeth Garrett Anderson (1836–1917, England, nf)
- Ethel Anderson (1883–1958, Australia, p/f/nf)
- Freddie Anderson (1922–2001, Ireland/Scotland, d/p)
- Hilary Andersson (born 1967, US/England, nf)
- J. Redwood Anderson (1883–1964, England, p/d)
- James Anderson (1662–1728, Scotland, nf)
- James Anderson of Hermiston (1739–1808, Scotland, nf)
- Jessica Anderson (1916–2010, Australia, f)
- Jim Anderson (born 1937, England/Australia, f)
- John Anderson, 1726–1796, Scotland, nf)
- Kevin J. Anderson (born 1962, US, f)
- Lena Anderson (born 1939, Sweden, ch)
- Marjorie Ogilvie Anderson (1909–2002, Scotland, nf)
- Matthew Tobin Anderson (born 1968, US, ch)
- Patrick Anderson (1618–1635, Scotland, nf/p)
- Perry Anderson (born 1938, England, nf)
- Poul Anderson (1926–2001, US, f)
- Rachel Anderson (born 1943, England, ch)
- Robert Anderson (1841–1918, Ireland/England, nf)
- Terry L. Anderson (living, US, nf)
- Verily Anderson (1915–2010, England, ch/nf)
- Victor Henry Anderson (1917–2001, US, p)
- Dan Andersson (1888–1920, Sweden, p)
- Emma Andijewska (born 1931, USSR/Germany, p/f)
- Venko Andonovski (born 1965, Yugoslavia/N Macedonia, f/d/p)
- Stojan Andov (born 1935, Yugoslavia/N Macedonia, nf)
- Carlos Drummond de Andrade (1902–1987, Brazil, p)
- César Dávila Andrade (1918–1967, Ecuador, p)
- Eugénio de Andrade (1923–2005, Portugal, p)
- Jorge Carrera Andrade (1903–1978, Ecuador, p/nf)
- Mário de Andrade (1893–1945, Brazil, p/f/nf)
- Mário Pinto de Andrade (1928–1990, Angola, p/nf)
- Oswald de Andrade (1890–1954, Brazil, f/p/nf)
- Bernard André (1450–1522, France/England, p)
- Lou Andreas-Salomé (1861–1937, Russia/Germany, f/d/nf)
- Neshani Andreas (1964–2011, SW Africa/Namibia, f)
- Emil Andreev (born 1956, Bulgaria, f/d)
- Petre M. Andreevski (1934–2006, Yugoslavia/N Macedonia, p/f/d)
- Peter Andrej (born 1959, Yugoslavia/Slovenia, p)
- Emil Andreev (born 1956, Bulgaria, f/d)
- Isabella Andreini (1562–1604), Italy, d/p)
- Stefan Andres (1906–1970, Germany/Italy, f)
- Sophia de Mello Breyner Andresen (1919–2004, Portugal, p/f)
- Bruce Andrews (born 1948, US, p/nf)
- Isobel Andrews (1905–1990, N Zealand, d/f/p)
- Julie Andrews (born 1935, England, ch/nf)
- Kevin Andrews (1924–1989, US, nf)
- V. C. Andrews (1923–1986, US, f)
- Ivo Andrić (1892–1975, Bosnia/Yugoslavia, f/p)
- Ron Androla (born 1954, US, p)
- Aneirin (early medieval, Cumbric kingdoms of Britain, p)
- Harriet Anena (living, Uganda, p/nf/f)
- Guru Angad (1504–1552, India, p)
- Patricia Angadi (1914–2001, England, f)
- Ernst Angel (1894–1986, Austria/US, p/nf)
- Ralph Angel (1951–2020, US, p)
- Marguerite de Angeli (1889–1987, US, ch)
- Stefano degli Angeli (1623–1697, Italy, nf)
- Klairi Angelidou (1932–2021, Turkey/Cyprus, p/nf)
- April De Angelis (born 1960, England, d)
- Norman Angell (1872–1967, England, nf)
- Domenico Angelo (1717–1802, Italy/England, nf)
- Maya Angelou (1928–2014, US, p/nf)
- Eduardo Angeloz (1931–2017, Argentina, nf)
- Angelus Silesius (c. 1624–1677, Germany, nf), pseudonym of Johann Scheffler
- Kenneth Anger (1927–2023, US, d/nf)
- Giulio Angioni (1939–2017, Italy, f/nf)
- Jared Angira (born 1947, Kenya, p)
- Ndeutala Angolo (born 1952, SW Africa/Namibia, f/nf)
- María Nsué Angüe (1945–2017, Equatorial Guinea, f/p/nf)
- Jonah Anguka (living, Kenya, nf)
- James Stout Angus (1830–1923, Scotland, p/nf)
- Marion Angus (1865–1946, Scotland, p/nf)
- Sam Angus (born 1967, England, ch)
- Helena Anhava (1925–2018), Finland, p)
- Thea Astley (1925–2004), Australian fiction writer and poet
- T. E. Anin (living, Gold Coast/Ghana, nf)
- Guda Anjaiah (1955–2016, India, p)
- Augusto dos Anjos (1884–1914, Brazil, p)
- Nadia Anjuman (1980–2005, Afghanistan, p)
- Charlotte Anley (1796–1893, England, f/nf)
- G. E. M. Anscombe (1919–2001, Ireland/England, nf)
- Süreyya Aylin Antmen (born 1981, Turkey, p/nf)
- Ella Anker (1870–1958, Norway, nf/d)
- Nini Roll Anker (1873–1942, Norway, f/d)
- Robert Anker (1946–2017, Netherlands, f)
- Charlotte Anley (1796–1893, England, f/nf)
- Threes Anna (born 1959, Netherlands, f/d), pseudonym of Threes Schreurs
- Abdullahi Ahmed An-Na'im (born 1946, Sudan/US, nf)
- Kofi Annan (1938–2018, Gold Coast/Switzerland, nf)
- J. K. Annand (1908–1993, Scotland, p/ch)
- Anni Baobei (born 1974, China, f), pseudonym of Li Jie (励婕)
- Núria Añó (born 1973, Spain, f/nf)
- Anrakuan Sakuden (安楽庵策伝, 1554–1642, Japan, nf/p)
- Ali Ansari (born 1967, Italy/Scotland, nf)
- Khwaja Muhammad Latif Ansari (1887–1979, India/Pakistan, nf/p)
- Anselm of Canterbury (1033/1034–1109, Italy/England, nf)
- Peter Anson (1889–1975, England, nf)
- Christopher Anstey (1724–1805, England, p)
- Marion Anstis (living, Australia, nf)
- Manana Antadze (born 1945, USSR, nf)
- Anthim the Iberian (1650–1717, Iberia/Wallachia, nf)
- Anthony (安东尼, born 1984, China/Australia ch), pseudonym of Ma Liang (马亮)
- Evelyn Anthony (1926–2018, England, f)
- Lawrence Anthony (1950–2012, S Africa, nf)
- Michael Anthony (1930–2023, Trinidad, f/nf)
- Piers Anthony (born 1934, UK/US, f)
- Mika Antić (1932–1986, Yugoslavia/Serbia, p/nf)
- David Antin (1932–2016, US, p/nf)
- Antler (born 1946, US, p), birth name Brad Burdick
- Sorin Antohi (born 1957, Romania, nf)
- Susanne Antonetta (born 1956, US, p/nf)
- Slobodan Antonić (born 1959, Yugoslavia/Serbia, nf)
- Voja Antonić (born 1952, Yugoslavia/US, nf)
- Brother Antoninus (1912–1994, US, p), pseudonym of William Everson
- Torben Antretter (born 1992, Germany, nf)
- Raymond Antrobus (born 1986, England, p)
- António Lobo Antunes (born 1942, Portugal, f)
- Gabriela Antunes (1937–2004, Angola, f/nf/ch)
- Christopher Anvil (1925–2009, US, f), pseudonym of Harry Christopher Crosby
- Chairil Anwar (1922–1949, Dutch E Indies/Indonesia, p)
- Robert Anwood (living, US, f), pseudonym
- Erica Sugo Anyadike (living, Tanzania, nf)
- Kofi Anyidoho (born 1947, Gold Coast/Ghana, p/nf)
- Anyte of Tegea (fl. early 3rd c. BCE, Greece, p)
- Johannes Anyuru (born 1979, Sweden, p/nf)
- Gloria E. Anzaldúa (1942–2004, US, p/nf)
- Ludwig Anzengruber (1839–1889, Austrian E, d/f/p)
- Atsuko Anzai (安西篤子, born 1927, Japan, f)
- Fuyue Anzai (安西冬衛, 1898–1965, Japan/China, p)

== Ao–At ==
- Leïla Aouchal (1936–2013, France/Algeria, nf)
- Góshó Aoyama (山剛昌, born 1963, Japan, f)
- Johann August Apel (1771–1816, Germany, f)
- Guillaume Apollinaire (1880–1918, France, p/d/f)
- Sulpicius Apollinaris (fl. 2nd c. CE, nf/p)
- Apollodorus of Carystus (fl. 300–260 BCE, Greece, d)
- Apollonius of Rhodes (270 – post–245 BCE, Alexandria, p)
- Péter Apor (1676–1752, Hungary, nf)
- Maja Apostoloska (born 1976, Yugoslavia/N Macedonia, p/nf)
- Arjun Appadurai (born 1949, US, nf)
- Nathacha Appanah (born 1973, Mauritius, f)
- Jacob M. Appel (born 1973, US, f/nf/p)
- Aharon Appelfeld (1932–2018, Romania/Israel, f)
- Charles James Apperley (1777–1843, Wales/England, nf)
- Adolphe Appia (1862–1928, Switzerland, nf)
- Kwame Anthony Appiah (born 1954, England/US, nf/f)
- Max Apple (born 1941, US, f)
- Katherine Applegate (born 1956, US, ch)
- Lisa Appignanesi (born 1946, Canada/England, nf)
- Philip Appleman (1926–2020, US, p/nf)
- Richard Appleton (1932–2005, Australia, p)
- Victor Appleton (US house pseudonym since 1910s)
- Katherine Applegate (born 1956, US, ch)
- Boris Aprilov (1921–1995, Bulgaria, f/d/ch)
- Lajos Áprily (1887–1967, Hungary, p)
- Ann Catrin Apstein-Müller (born 1973, Germany, p)
- Apuleius (124–170 CE, Roman E, f/nf)
- Pawlu Aquilina (1929–2009, Malta, p/nf)
- Louis Aragon (1897–1982, France, p/n)
- Shio Aragvispireli (1867–1926, Russian E/USSR, f)
- Arai Hakuseki (新井白石, 1657–1725, Japan, nf)
- Motoko Arai (新井素子, born 1960, Japan, f)
- Tōichirō Araki (荒木東一郎, 1895–1977, Japan, nf)
- Ivan Aralica (born 1930, Yugoslavia/Croatia, f/nf)
- Arambilet (born 1957, Dominican Rep., f/p/d), pseudonym of Ángel Luis Arambilet Álvarez
- Gonzalo Arango (1931–1976, Colombia, nf/p)
- Graça Aranha (1868–1931, Brazil, nf/f)
- János Arany (1817–1882, Hungary, p)
- Aratus (c. 315/310–240 BCE, Greece, p)
- Helena Araújo (1934–2015, Colombia, nf)
- Maria Arbatova (born 1957, USSR/Russia, f/d/p)
- John Arbuthnot (1667–1735, Scotland/England, nf)
- José Arce (1881–1968, Argentina/US, nf)
- Manuel Maples Arce (1900–1981, Mexico, p/nf)
- Jeffrey Archer (1940-2026, England, f)
- Jennifer Archer (born 1957, US, f/ch)
- Maria Archer (1899–1982, Portugal, f/ch/d), pseudonym of Maria Emilia Archer Eyrolles Baltasar Moreira
- Mary Archer (born 1944, England, nf)
- Robyn Archer (born 1948, Australia, d/p/nf)
- Archil II (1647–1713, Kingdom of Georgia/Russia, p)
- Archilochus (c. 680–645 BCE, Greece, p)
- Archimedes (c. 287 – c. 212 BCE, Greece, nf)
- Philip Ardagh (born 1961, England, f/ch)
- Elvia Ardalani (born 1963, Mexico, p/nf/f)
- Lavrenti Ardaziani (1815–1870, Russian E, f)
- Jane Arden (1927–1982, England, d)
- Edward Ardizzone (1900–1979, China/England, ch/nf)
- Britt Arenander (born 1941, Sweden, f/p)
- Reinaldo Arenas (1943–1990, Cuba, p/f/d)
- Ana Paula Arendt (born 1980, Brazil, ch/d/p)
- Hannah Arendt (1906–1975, Germany/US, nf)
- Walter Conrad Arensberg (1878–1954, US, p)
- Juan Argerich (1862–1924, Argentina, f/nf)
- Tudor Arghezi (1880–1967, Romania, p/ch)
- Alcides Arguedas (1879–1946, Bolivia, nf/f)
- José María Arguedas (1911–1969, Peru, f/p/nf)
- Manlio Argueta (born 1935, El Salvador, p/f)
- Yemisi Aribisala (born 1973, Nigeria, nf)
- Homero Aridjis (born 1940, Mexico, p/f/nf)
- Dan Ariely (born 1967, US/Israel, nf)
- Philippe Ariès (1914–1984, France, nf)
- Afonso Arinos (1868–1916, Brazil, nf)
- Ludovico Ariosto (1474–1533, Italy, p/d)
- Ikuma Arishima (有島生馬, 1882–1974, Japan, f)
- Takeo Arishima (有島武郎, 1878–1923, Japan, f/nf)
- Aelius Aristides (AD 118–181, Greece, nf)
- Aristophanes (c. 446–385 BC, Greece, d/p)
- Aristotle (384–322 BCE, Greece, nf)
- Sawako Ariyoshi (有吉佐和子, 1931–1984, Japan, f)
- Guru Arjan (1563–1606, India, p)
- Reginald Arkell (1881–1959, England, d/f)
- Mohammed Arkoun (1928–2010, Algeria, nf)
- Aleksander Arkuszyński (1918–2016, Poland, nf)
- Michael Arlen (1895–1956, Bulgaria/US, nf/f/d), born Dikran Kouyoumdjian
- Roberto Arlt (1900–1942, Argentina, f/d/nf)
- Ayi Kwei Armah (born 1939, Gold Coast/Ghana, f/nf/ch)
- Venero Armanno (born 1959, Australia, f/ch)
- Kristinn Ármannsson (1895–1966, Iceland, nf)
- Rae Armantrout (born 1947, US, p, nf)
- T. Q. Armar (1915–2000, Gold Coast/Ghana, nf)
- Raphael Armattoe (1913–1953, Gold Coast/Ghana, nf/p)
- Sergio Román Armendáriz (born 1934, Ecuador, p/d)
- Laura Adams Armer (1874–1963, US, nf/ch)
- Simon Armitage (born 1963, England, p/d/f)
- Annie Armitt (1850–1933, England, f/p/nf)
- Rebecca Agatha Armour (1845–1891, Canada, f)
- Richard Armour (1906–1989, US, p/nf/ch)
- Isobel Armstrong (born 1937, England, nf)
- Karen Armstrong (born 1944, England, nf)
- Lindsay Armstrong (living, S Africa/Australia, f)
- Martin Armstrong (1882–1974, f/p)
- Millicent Armstrong (1888–1973, Australia, d)
- Peter Armstrong (born 1957, England, p)
- Richard Armstrong (1903–1986, England, f/ch)
- Sarah Armstrong (born 1968, Australia, f)
- Tilly Armstrong (1927–2010, England, f)
- William H. Armstrong (1911–1999, US, ch)
- Bergþóra Árnadóttir (1948–2007, Iceland, p)
- Nína Björk Árnadóttir (1941–2000, Iceland, d/p/f)
- Bergljót Arnalds (born 1968, Iceland, ch)
- Jón Árnason (1819–1888, Iceland, nf/ch)
- Örn Árnason (born 1959, Iceland, d)
- Céline Arnauld (1885–1952, Romania/France, p/f)
- Ernst Moritz Arndt (1769–1860, Swedish Pomerania/Germany, nf/p)
- Achim von Arnim (1781–1831, Germany, p/f)
- Bettina von Arnim (1785–1859, Germany, nf)
- Craig Arnold (1967–2009, US, p)
- Edwin Arnold (1822–1904, England, p/nf)
- Edwin Lester Arnold (1857–1935, England, nf/f)
- Elizabeth Arnold (born 1944, England, ch)
- Gottfried Arnold (1666–1714, Germany, nf)
- Janet Arnold (1932–1998, England, nf)
- Matthew Arnold (1822–1888, England, p/nf)
- Ron Arnold (1937–2022, US, nf)
- Sarah Louise Arnold (1859–1943, US, nf)
- Tedd Arnold (born 1949, US, ch)
- Thomas James Arnold (c. 1804–1887, England, nf)
- William Delafield Arnold (1828–1859, England, nf)
- Arnórr jarlaskáld (c. 1012–1070s, Iceland, p)
- Þjóðólfr Arnórsson (fl. 11th c., Iceland/Norway, p)
- Hugo Arnot (1749–1786, Scotland, nf)
- Jean Arp (1886–1966, Germany/Switzerland, p), full name Hans Peter Wilhelm Arp
- Franciszka Arnsztajnowa (1865–1942, Poland, p/d), Holocaust victim
- Fernando Arrabal (born 1932, Spain, d/f/p)
- Hafsa bint al-Hajj Arrakuniyya ((died 1190, Andalusia, p)
- Renée Ferrer de Arréllaga (born 1944, Paraguay, p/f)
- Juan José Arreola (1918–2001, Mexico, f)
- Guillermo Arriaga (born 1958, Mexico, f/d)
- Arrian (c. 86/89 – post-146/160 CE, Greece, nf)), Greek name Arrianos
- Yolanda Arroyo Pizarro (born 1970, Puerto Rico, f/nf/ch)
- Pat Arrowsmith (1930–2023, England, f/nf/p)
- I'timad Arrumaimikiyya (born 1045/1047, Andalusia, p)
- Emmanuelle Arsan (1932–2005, Thailand/France, f), pseudonym of Marayat Rollet-Andriane
- Vladimir Arsenijević (born 1965, Yugoslavia/Serbia, f/nf)
- Vladimir Arsenyev (1872–1930, Russian E/USSR, nf)
- Hranush Arshagyan (1887–1905, Ottoman E, p)
- Eustahija Arsić (1776–1843, Austria-Hungary, nf)
- Ahmed Ibrahim Artan (living, Somalia, nf)
- Antonin Artaud (1896–1948, France, d/p/nf)
- Rosalía Arteaga (born 1956, Ecuador, nf)
- Miguel Arteche (1926–2012, Chile, p/f)
- Keri Arthur (born 1967, Australia, f)
- Portia Arthur (born 1990, Ghana, ch)
- Ruth M. Arthur (1905–1979, Scotland, ch), born Ruth Mabel Arthur Huggins
- H. C. Artmann (1921–2000, Austria, p/nf/f)
- Tovma Artsruni (fl. 9th–10th c., Armenia, nf)
- K. O. Arvidson (1938–2011, N Zealand, p/nf)
- Ingeborg Arvola (born 1974, Norway, n/ch)
- Akram Monfared Arya (born 1946, Iran/Sweden, nf)
- Germán List Arzubide (1898–1998, Mexico, p/nf)
- Gheorghe Asachi (1788–1869, Ukraine/Romania, p/f/d)
- Jirō Asada (浅田次郎, born 1951, Japan, f/nf)
- Houshang Asadi (born 1951, Iran/France, nf)
- Milan Asadurov (1949–2019, Bulgaria, f)
- Zabel Sibil Asadour (1863–1934, Ottoman E/Turkey, nf)
- Asai Ryōi (浅井了意, c. 1612–1691, Japan, f/nf)
- Khadambi Asalache (1935–2006, Kenya/England, f/p)
- M. K. Asante (born 1982, US, nf)
- Bediako Asare (born 1930, Gold Coast/Tanzania, f/nf)
- Meshack Asare (born 1945, Gold Coast/Germany, ch)
- Yaw Asare (1954–2002, Ghana, nf)
- Catherine Asaro (born 1955, US, f)
- Lado Asatiani (1917–1943, USSR, p)
- Peter Christen Asbjørnsen (1812–1885, Norway, nf)
- Hilario Ascasubi (1807–1875, Argentina, p)
- Frank Asch (born 1946, US, ch)
- Sholem Asch (1880–1957, Poland/England, f/d/nf)
- Oscar Asche (1871–1936, Australia, d)
- Birgit Aschmann (born 1967, Germany, nf)
- Abdoulaye Ascofaré (born 1949, Mali, p/d)
- Gaber Asfour (1944–2021, Egypt, nf)
- Issa Asgarally (living, Mauritius, nf)
- John Asgill (1659–1738, England, nf)
- Eysteinn Ásgrímsson (c. 1310–1361, Iceland, p)
- Russell Ash (1946–2010, England, nf/ch)
- John Ashbery (1927–2017, US, p/nf)
- Elizabeth Ashbridge (1713–1755, England/N American colonies, nf)
- Cliff Ashby (1919–2012, England, p/f)
- Deborah Ashby (born 1959, England, nf)
- Joseph Ashby-Sterry (1836 or 1838–1917, England, p/f/nf)
- Laura Ashe (living, England, nf)
- Helen Asher (1927–2001, Australia, f)
- Michael Asher (born 1953, England, nf/f)
- Jay Asher (born 1975, US, f/nf)
- Daisy Ashford (1881–1972, England, f)
- Lindsay Ashford (born 1959, England, f/nf)
- Taku Ashibe (芦辺拓, born 1958, Japan, f)
- Dariush Ashoori (born 1938, Iran, nf)
- Mariam bint Abu Ya'qub Ashshilbi (died 1020, Andalusia, p)
- Mary Ashun (born 1968, Ghana, f/ch)
- Bernard Ashley (born 1935, England, ch)
- Melissa Ashley (born 1973, Australia, f)
- Renée Ashley (born 1949, US, p/f/nf)
- Robert Ashley (1565–1641, England, nf)
- Anthony Ashley-Cooper, 3rd Earl of Shaftesbury (1671–1713, England/Italy, nf)
- Carl Ashmore (born 1968, England, ch)
- Radwa Ashour (1946–2014, Egypt, f)
- Charles Ashton (1848–1899, Wales, nf)
- Francis Leslie Ashton (1904–1994, England, f)
- Kalinda Ashton (living, Australia, f)
- Leah Ashton (living, Australia, f)
- Rosemary Ashton (born 1947, England, nf)
- Sylvia Ashton-Warner (1908–1984, N Zealand, f/nf)
- Asiimwe Deborah GKashugi (living, Uganda, d), born Deborah Asiimwe
- Isaac Asimov (1920–1992, USSR/US, f/nf)
- Janet Asimov (1926–2019, US, f/ch), pseudonym J. O. Jeppson
- Abu Abdallah ibn Askar (1529–1578, Morocco, nf)
- Rashid Askari (born 1965, E Pakistan/Bangladesh, nf/f)
- Anton Aškerc (1856–1912, Austrian E, p)
- Anne Askew (1520/1521–1546), England, p)
- Kjell Askildsen (1929–2021, Norway, f)
- Ibrahim Aslan (1935–2012, Egypt, f)
- Mahmoud Aslan (1902 – post-1971, Tunisia, f/d)
- Louise Aslanian (1902/1906–1945, Iran/France, p/f), Holocaust victim
- Timoshenko Aslanides (1943–2020, Australia, p)
- Nana Asma'u (1793–1864, Sokoto Caliphate, nf/p)
- Adam Asnyk (1838–1897, Poland/Austria-Hungary, p/d)
- Werner Aspenström (1918–1997, Sweden, p)
- Aemilius Asper (fl. 1st c. CE or late 2nd c. CE, Rome, nf)
- Asphyxia (living, Australia, ch)
- Robert Asprin (1946–2008, US, f)
- Clare Asquith (born 1951, England, nf)
- Lady Cynthia Asquith (1887–1960, England, f/nf/cs)
- Herbert Asquith (1881–1947, p/f)
- Margot Asquith (1864–1945, Scotland/England, nf)
- Ros Asquith (living, England, ch)
- Abu al-Abbas as-Sabti (1129–1204, Morocco, nf)
- Mina Assadi (born 1943, Iran/Sweden, p/nf)
- Ryad Assani-Razaki (born 1981, Benin/Canada, f)
- Robert Assaraf (1936–2018, Morocco/France, nf)
- Akram Assem (born 1965, Afghanistan, nf)
- Akwasi Bretuo Assensoh (born 1946, Gold Coast/US, nf)
- Machado de Assis (1839–1908, Brazil, f/p/d)
- Mary Astell (1666–1731, England, nf)
- David Astle (born 1961, Australia, nf/f/d)
- Thomas Astle (1735–1803, England, nf)
- Judy Astley (living, England, f/nf)
- Thea Astley (1925–2004, Australia, f/p)
- Margaret Aston (1932–2014, England, nf)
- Tilly Aston (1873–1947, Australia, p/nf)
- Carlos Astrada (1894–1970, Argentina, nf)
- Jean Astruc (1684–1766, France, nf)
- Miguel Ángel Asturias (1899–1974, Guatemala/Spain, p/f/d)
- Alaa Al Aswany (born 1957, Egypt, f/nf)
- Bogoboj Atanacković (1826–1858, Hungary/Serbia, f)
- Ksenija Atanasijević (1894–1981, Serbia/Yugoslavia, nf)
- Sonja Atanasijević (born 1962, Yugoslavia/Serbia, f)
- Nataša Atanasković (born 1972, Yugoslavia/Serbia, f)
- Platon Atanacković (1788–1867, Habsburg E, nf)
- Manouchehr Atashi (1931–2005, Iran, p/nf)
- Oğuz Atay (1934–1977, Turkey, f)
- Jón Hnefill Aðalsteinsson (1927–2010, Iceland, nf)
- Athanasius of Alexandria (c. 296/298–373 CE, Greece, nf)
- Edwin Atherstone (1788–1872, England, p/f)
- Cassandra Atherton (living, Australia, p/nf)
- Yusuf Atılgan (1921–1989, Ottoman E/Turkey, f/d)
- Abu Jafar ibn Atiyya (died 1158, Morocco, nf)
- Lucy Atkins (born 1968, England, f/nf)
- Peter Atkins (born 1940, England, nf)
- Blanche Atkinson (1847–1911, England, f/ch)
- Diane Atkinson (living, England, nf)
- Hugh Atkinson (1924–1994, Australia, f/ch)
- Kate Atkinson (born 1951, England, f/d)
- Louisa Atkinson (1834–1872, Australia, f/nf)
- M. E. Atkinson (1899–1974, England, ch)
- Rupert Atkinson (1881–1961, Australia, p/d)
- Tiffany Atkinson (born 1972, Germany/Wales, p)
- William Walker Atkinson (1862–1932, US, nf)
- Odafe Atogun (living, Nigeria, f)
- Vishnu Raj Atreya (1944–2020, Nepal, nf/p)
- Sefi Atta (born 1964, Nigeria/US, f/d)
- Ayesha Harruna Attah (born 1983, Ghana/Senegal, f)
- Karen Attard (born 1958, Australia, f)
- David Attenborough (born 1926, England, nf)
- Per Daniel Amadeus Atterbom (1790–1855, Sweden, p)
- Mririda n'Ait Attik (c. 1900 – c. 1940s, Morocco, p)
- Amelia Atwater-Rhodes (born 1984, US, f/ch)
- Margaret Atwood (born 1939, Canada, n/f/nf)

== Au–Az ==
- Elise Aubert (1837–1909, Norway, f/nf)
- Madeleine de l'Aubespine (1546–1596, France, p)
- Jean-Henri Merle d'Aubigné (1794–1872, Switzerland, nf)
- Cécile Aubry (1928–2010, France, ch)
- Edward St Aubyn (born 1960, England, f/nf)
- Penelope Aubin (c. 1679 – c. 1738, England, f/p)
- John Aubrey (1626–1697, England, nf)
- Hennie Aucamp (1934–2014, S Africa, p/f/nf)
- Dorothy Auchterlonie (1915–1991, England/Australia, nf/p)
- W. H. Auden (1907–1973, England/Austria, p/nf)
- Jean Auel (born 1936, US, f)
- Martin Auer (born 1951, Austria, ch/f/nf)
- Raoul Auernheimer (1876–1948, Austria/US, nf)
- Count Anton Alexander von Auersperg (1806–1876, Austrian E, p), pseudonym Anastasius Grün
- Steve Augarde (born 1950, England, f/ch)
- Augustine of Hippo (354–430, N Africa, nf)
- Imre Augustič (1837–1879, Hungary, nf/p)
- Lillian Aujo (living, Uganda, f/p)
- Kjell Aukrust (1920–2002, Norway, f)
- Olav Aukrust (1883–1929, Norway, p)
- Ingri and Edgar Parin d'Aulaire (1904–1980; 1898–1986, Norway/US, ch)
- Htin Aung (1909–1978, Burma, nf)
- Pe Aung (1917–2006, Burma/Myanmar, nf)
- Francis Aupiais (1877–1945, France/Benin, nf)
- Marcus Aurelius (121–180 CE, Roman E, nf)
- Jules Barbey d'Aurevilly (1808–1889, France, f)
- Maria Aurora (1937–2010, Portugal, p/f/ch), pseudonym of Aurora Augusta Figueiredo de Carvalho Homem
- Joseph Auslander (1897–1965, US, p/f)
- Rose Ausländer (1901–1988, Austro-Hungarian E/Germany, p)
- Ausonius (c. 310 – c. 395, Roman Gaul, p/nf)
- Jane Austen (1775–1817, England, f)
- Paul Auster (born 1947, US, f/p/nf)
- Ralph Austen (c. 1612–1676, England, nf)
- Alfred Austin (1835–1913, England, p)
- Jane G. Austin (1831–1894, US, f)
- John Austin (1790–1859, England, nf)
- Sarah Austin (1793–1867, England/Germany, nf)
- Jonathan Auxier (born 1981, Canada, ch)
- Jovan Avakumović (c. 1748–1810, Habsburg E, p)
- Gertrudis Gómez de Avellaneda (1814–1873, Cuba/Spain, d/p/f)
- Esther Averill (1902–1992, US, ch)
- Gillian Avery (1926–2016, England, f/nf)
- Harold Avery (1867–1943, England, ch)
- James Avery (1945–2013, US, p)
- Avi (born 1937, US, ch)
- Tusiata Avia (born 1960, N Zealand, p/ch)
- Tamsier Joof Aviance (born 1973, Gambia, nf)
- Avicenna (c. 980–1037, Samanid E/Iran, nf/p), Arabic name Ibn Sina
- Carlos Lobo de Ávila (1860–1895, Portugal, nf)
- Bunty Avieson (living, Australia, f/nf)
- Margaret Avison (1918–2007, Canada, p/nf)
- Smilja Avramov (1918–2018, Yugoslavia/Serbia, nf)
- Dimitrije Avramović (1815–1855, Serbia, nf)
- Tash Aw (born 1971, Malaysia/England, f/nf), full name Aw Ta-Shi (歐大旭)
- Krayem Awad (born 1948, Syria/Austria, p)
- Usman Awang (1929–2001, Malaya/Malaysia, p/d/f)
- Christopher Awdry (born 1940, England, ch)
- Wilbert Awdry (1911–1997, England, ch), known as Rev. W. Awdry
- Ngahuia Te Awekotuku (born 1949, N Zealand, nf)
- Diane Awerbuck (born 1974, S Africa, f/nf)
- Farah Awl (1937–1991, Somaliland/Somalia, nf/p), full name Faarax Maxamed Jaamac Cawl
- Kofi Awoonor (1935–2013, Gold Coast/Ghana, p/f/nf)
- Mohammed Awzal (1670–1749, Morocco, nf)
- Jan Axelson (born 1949, US, nf)
- Majgull Axelsson (born 1947, Sweden, nf)
- Ibrahima Aya (born 1967, Mali, nf/f)
- Felipe Guaman Poma de Ayala (c. 1535 – post-1616, Peru, nf)
- Yukito Ayatsuji (内田直行, born 1960, Japan, f)
- Fatma Aydemir (born 1986, Germany, f/nf)
- Kyi Aye (1929–2016, Burma/Myanmar, p/f)
- A. J. Ayer (1910–1989, England, nf)
- Gennadiy Aygi (1934–2006, USSR/Russia, p)
- Nana Oforiatta Ayim (living, Ghana, f/nf)
- Joseph Ayloffe (1708–1781, England, nf)
- Zighen Aym (born 1957, Algeria/US, nf)
- Marcel Aymé (1902–1967, France, f/ch)
- Ayo Ayoola-Amale (living, Nigeria, p)
- Nabil Ayouch (born 1969, France, f)
- Ed Ayres (born 1941, US, nf)
- Ed Ayres (born 1967, Australia, nf)
- Pam Ayres (born 1947, England, p)
- Hertha Ayrton (1854–1923, England, nf)
- Robert Aytoun (1570–1638, Scotland, p)
- Awista Ayub (born c. 1979, Afghanistan/India, f)
- Tetsuya Ayukawa (鮎川哲也, 1919–2002, Japan, nf/f)
- Iwao Ayusawa (鮎沢巌, 1894–1972, Japan, nf)
- Qadi Ayyad ben Moussa (1083–1149, Almoravid E, nf)
- Abu Salim al-Ayyashi (1628–1679, Morocco, nf/p)
- Humayun Azad (1947–2004, India/Germany, p/f/nf)
- Shokoofeh Azar (born 1972, Iran/Australia, f)
- Maryam Jafari Azarmani (born 1977, Iran, p/nf)
- Ali Azayku (1942–2004, Morocco, p/nf)
- Predrag Azdejković (born 1978, Germany/Serbia, nf)
- Aluisio Azevedo (1857–1913, Brazil, f/nf/d)
- Álvares de Azevedo (1831–1852, Brazil, p/f/d)
- Artur Azevedo (1855–1908, Brazi. f/d/p)
- Uche Azikiwe (born 1947, Nigeria, nf)
- Mariano Azuela (1873–1952, Mexico, f/d/nf)
- Kiyohiko Azuma (あずまきよひこ, born 1968, Japan, f)
- Trezza Azzopardi (born 1961, Wales/England, f)
- Jody Azzouni (born 1954, US, nf)
- Nnorom Azuonye (1967–2024, Biafra/Nigeria, d/p/nf)
- Abd Allah ibn Azzuz (died 1789, Morocco, nf)
