= Wanna Be a Bride =

I want to get married
- Author: Ghada Abdel Aal
- Original title: عايزة أتجوز
- Translator: Barbara Teresi "Italian", Nora Eltahawy "English", Djûke Poppinga "Dutch", Abeer Soliman "Dutch"
- Language: Egyptian Colloquial
- Series: Mudawwan@al-Shuruq
- Publisher: Dar al-Shuruq
- Publication date: 2008
- Publication place: Egypt
- Media type: Print (Paperback)
- Pages: 178
- ISBN: 9780292723979
- OCLC: 304155096
- LC Class: HQ800.4.E3 A34 2008

Wanna be a bride (Egyptian Arabic: عايزة أتجوز; [ˈʕæjzæ (ʔæ)tˈɡæwːez]) is a popular Egyptian book by Ghada Abdel Aal based on a blog of the same name about the several (failed) marriage proposals the author has gone through. The book was published by the Egyptian printing house Shorouk in 2008. The book has a comic tone and addresses the author's thoughts and feelings during each failed marriage proposal that she has received. The book also covers the issue of the late age of marriage in Egypt due to economic reasons.

== The author ==
Ghada Abdel Aal (born 21 December 1978, El-Mahalla El-Kubra) works as a pharmacist. She also wrote the screenplay of 2 TV series. She introduces herself on her blog as

a representative of 15 million females from 25 to 35 years who are pressured by the society everyday to get married even though this matter is out of their hands.

== Translations ==
Translations
Language	Translator	Publisher	Title	Data/year
Italian	Barbara Teresi	Epoché Edizioni	Che il velo sia da sposa!	2 October 2009
English	Nora Eltahawy	University of Texas Press	Wanna be a bride (alternatively translated as Wanna-B-A-Bride or I Want to Get Married)	23 September 2010
Dutch	Djûke Poppinga & Abeer Soliman	Nieuw Amsterdam	Ik wil trouwen!	22 October 2010
German	Kristina Bergmann	Lenos Verlag	Ich will heiraten!: Partnersuche auf Ägyptisch	February 2012
French	Marie Charton	Editions de l'Aube	La ronde des prétendants (alternatively translated as Cherche mari désespérément)	24 October 2012

== Reception ==
Both the book and the blog are popular among young Egyptians (both males and females). A TV series starring Hend Sabri was made in 2010. The book has received positive reviews and was covered in the Egyptian media in popular talk shows and newspapers (e.g. Almasry Alyoum, Los Angeles Times, la Repubblica, The Independent).
