= Egyptian Arabic =

Arabic variety spoken in Egypt

- مصرى (Masri)
- Pronunciation: [ˈmɑsˤɾi]
- Native to: Egypt
- Ethnicity: Egyptians
- Speakers: L1: 84 million (2024); L2: 35 million (2024); Total: 119 million (2024)
- Language family: Afro-Asiatic: Semitic; West Semitic; Central Semitic; Arabic; Egyptian Arabic
- Dialects: Judeo-Egyptian Arabic; Other regional variations
- Writing system: Arabic alphabet chat alphabet

Language codes
- ISO 639-3: arz
- Glottolog: egyp1253
- IETF: ar-EG
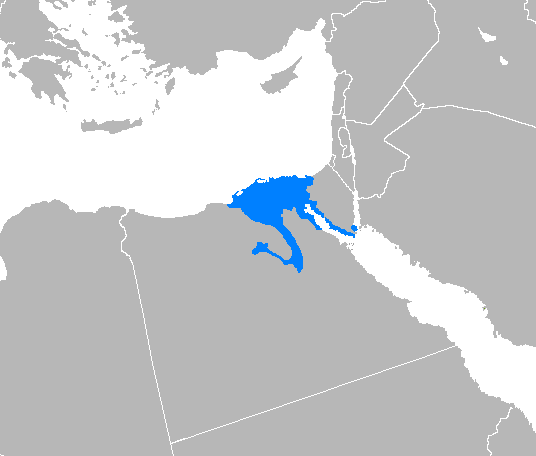
- Areas where Egyptian Arabic is spoken (in dark blue those areas where it is the most widely spoken).

Egyptian Arabic, locally known as Colloquial Egyptian, (Note: Egyptian Arabic: العامية المصرية, [el.ʕæmˈmejjæ l.mɑsˤˈɾejjɑ]) or simply as Masri, (Note: Egyptian Arabic: مصرى, lit. 'Egyptian') is the most widely spoken vernacular Arabic variety in Egypt. It is part of the Afro-Asiatic language family, and originated in the Nile Delta in Lower Egypt. The estimated 111 million Egyptians speak a continuum of dialects. Egyptian Arabic is also known as Cairene Arabic. It is also understood across most of the Arabic-speaking countries due to broad Egyptian influence in the region, including through Egyptian cinema and Egyptian music. These factors help make it the most widely spoken and by far the most widely studied variety of Arabic.

While it is primarily a spoken language, the written form is used in novels, plays and poems (vernacular literature), as well as in comics, advertising, some newspapers and transcriptions of popular songs. In most other written media and in radio and television news reporting, literary Arabic is used. Literary Arabic is a standardized language based on the language of the Qur'an, i.e. Classical Arabic. The Egyptian vernacular is almost universally written in the Arabic alphabet for local consumption, although it is commonly transcribed into Latin letters or in the International Phonetic Alphabet in linguistics text and textbooks aimed at teaching non-native learners. Egyptian Arabic's phonetics, grammatical structure, and vocabulary are influenced by the Coptic language; its rich vocabulary is also influenced by Turkish and by European languages such as French, Italian, Greek, and English.

== Naming ==
Speakers of Egyptian Arabic generally call their vernacular Arabic (عربى, [ˈʕɑrɑbi]) when juxtaposed with non-Arabic languages; Colloquial Egyptian (العاميه المصريه, [el.ʕæmˈmejjæ l.mɑsˤˈɾejjɑ]) (Note: Classical Arabic pronunciation: [alluʁˠatu lmisˠɾijjatu lʕaːmmijja]; Literary Arabic: /alluɣatu lmisˤrijjatu lʕaːmmijja/.) or simply Aamiyya (عاميه, colloquial) when juxtaposed with Modern Standard Arabic and the Egyptian dialect (اللهجه المصريه, [elˈlæhɡæ l.mɑsˤˈɾejjɑ]) (Note: Classical Arabic pronunciation: [allahɟatu lmisˠɾijja]; Literary Arabic: /allahɡatu lmisˤrijja/.) or simply Masri (مصرى, [ˈmɑsˤɾi], Egyptian) when juxtaposed with other vernacular Arabic dialects. (Note: Classical Arabic pronunciation: [alluʁˠatu lmisˠɾijjatu lħadiːθa]; Literary Arabic: /alluɣatu lmisˤrijjatu lħadiːθa/.)

The term Egyptian Arabic is usually used synonymously with Cairene Arabic, which is technically a dialect of Egyptian Arabic. The country's native name, مصر Maṣr, is often used locally to refer to Cairo itself. As is the case with Parisian French, Cairene Arabic is by far the most prevalent dialect in the country.

== Geographic distribution ==
Egyptian Arabic is used primarily in Egypt and is spoken predominantly in Cairo and Alexandria and in the capitals of all Egyptian governorates and in other major cities across Northern and Southern Egypt.

Egyptian Arabic has become widely understood in the Arabic-speaking world primarily for two reasons: The proliferation and popularity of Egyptian films and other media in the region since the early 20th century as well as the great number of Egyptian teachers and professors who were instrumental in setting up the education systems of various countries in the Arabian Peninsula and also taught there and in other countries such as Algeria and Libya. Also, many Lebanese artists choose to sing in Egyptian, prominent examples like Nancy Ajram and Sabah.

== History ==
Arabic was spoken in parts of Egypt, such as the eastern Nile Delta and Sinai, before Islam. It also seems as though some Egypto-Arabic words derive from old Ancient Egyptian words. However, Nile Valley Egyptians slowly adopted Arabic as a written language following the Muslim conquest of Egypt in the seventh century. Until then, they had spoken either Koine Greek or Egyptian in its Coptic form. A period of Coptic-Arabic bilingualism in Lower Egypt lasted for more than three centuries. The period would last much longer in the south. Arabic had been already familiar to Valley Egyptians since Arabic had been spoken throughout the eastern Nile Delta and Sinai. Egyptian Arabic seems to have begun taking shape in Fustat, the first Islamic capital of Egypt, now part of Cairo.

One of the earliest linguistic sketches of Cairene Arabic is a 16th-century document entitled Dafʿ al-ʾiṣr ʿan kalām ahl Miṣr(دفع الإصر عن كلام أهل مصر, "The Removal of the Burden from the Language of the People of Cairo") by the traveler and lexicographer Yusuf al-Maghribi (يوسف المغربي), with Misr here meaning "Cairo". It contains key information on early Cairene Arabic and the language situation in Egypt in the Middle Ages. The main purpose of the document was to show that while the Cairenes' vernacular contained many critical "errors" vis-à-vis Classical Arabic, according to al-Maghribi, it was also related to Arabic in other respects. With few waves of immigration from the Arabian peninsula such as the Banu Hilal exodus, who later left Egypt and were settled in Morocco and Tunisia, together with the ongoing Islamization and Arabization of the country, multiple Arabic varieties, one of which is Egyptian Arabic, slowly supplanted spoken Coptic. Local chroniclers mention the continued use of Coptic as a spoken language until the 17th century by peasant women in Upper Egypt. Coptic is still the liturgical language of the Coptic Orthodox Church of Alexandria and the Coptic Catholic Church.

Ahmed Kamal Pasha (1851–1923), the author of Egypt's first Ancient Egyptian dictionary, referred to the fact that more than 12,000 words from the Modern Egyptian Arabic dialect are rooted in the Ancient Egyptian language. Kamal's efforts were groundbreaking, especially his assertion of linguistic connections between ancient Egyptian and Semitic languages, as both belong to the same Afro-Asiatic language tree. His methodology involved transliterating hieroglyphs into Arabic letters, making the study of ancient texts accessible to Egyptians, who still carried the roots of their ancient language into the modern dialect.

== Status ==
Egyptian Arabic has no official status and is not officially recognized as a language in Egypt. Standard Arabic is the official language of the state as per constitutional law with the name اللغة العربية, al-luġa al-ʿarabiyyah, lit. 'the Arabic language'. Interest in the local vernacular began in the 1800s (in opposition to the language of the ruling class, Turkish), as the Egyptian national movement for self-determination was taking shape. For many decades to follow, questions about the reform and the modernization of Arabic were hotly debated in Egyptian intellectual circles. Proposals ranged from developing neologisms to replace archaic terminology in Modern Standard Arabic to the simplification of syntactical and morphological rules and the introduction of colloquialisms to even complete "Egyptianization" (تمصير, tamṣīr) by abandoning the so-called Modern Standard Arabic in favor of Masri or Egyptian Arabic.

Proponents of language reform in Egypt included Qasim Amin, who also wrote the first Egyptian feminist treatise; former President of the Egyptian University, Ahmed Lutfi el-Sayed; and noted intellectual Salama Moussa. They adopted a modernist, secular approach and disagreed with the assumption that Arabic was an immutable language because of its association with the Quran. The first modern Egyptian novel in which the dialogue was written in the vernacular was Muhammad Husayn Haykal's Zaynab in 1913. It was only in 1966 that Mustafa Musharafa's Kantara Who Disbelieved was released, the first novel to be written entirely in Egyptian Arabic. Other notable novelists, such as Ihsan Abdel Quddous and Yusuf Idris, and poets, such as Salah Jahin, Abdel Rahman el-Abnudi and Ahmed Fouad Negm, helped solidify vernacular literature as a distinct literary genre.

Amongst certain groups within Egypt's elite, Egyptian Arabic enjoyed a brief period of rich literary output. That dwindled with the rise of Pan-Arabism, which had gained popularity in Egypt by the second half of the twentieth century, as demonstrated by Egypt's involvement in the 1948 Arab–Israeli War under King Farouk of Egypt. The Egyptian revolution of 1952, led by Mohamed Naguib and Gamal Abdel Nasser, further enhanced the significance of Pan-Arabism, making it a central element of Egyptian state policy. The importance of Modern Standard Arabic was reemphasised in the public sphere by the revolutionary government, and efforts to accord any formal language status to the Egyptian vernacular were ignored. Egyptian Arabic was identified as a mere dialect, one that was not spoken even in all of Egypt, as almost all of Upper Egypt speaks Sa'idi Arabic. Though the revolutionary government heavily sponsored the use of the Egyptian vernacular in films, plays, television programmes, and music, the prerevolutionary use of Modern Standard Arabic in official publications was retained.

Linguistic commentators have noted the multi-faceted approach of the Egyptian revolutionaries towards the Arabic language. Whereas Naguib, Egypt's first president, exhibited a preference for using Modern Standard Arabic in his public speeches, his successor Gamal Abdel Nasser was renowned for using the vernacular and for punctuating his speeches with traditional Egyptian words and expressions. Conversely, Modern Standard Arabic was the norm for state news outlets, including newspapers, magazines, television, and radio. That was especially true of Egypt's national broadcasting company, the Arab Radio and Television Union, which was established with the intent of providing content for the entire Arab world, not merely Egypt, hence the need to broadcast in the standard, rather than the vernacular, language. The Voice of the Arabs radio station, in particular, had an audience from across the region, and the use of anything other than Modern Standard Arabic was viewed as eminently incongruous.

In a study of three Egyptian newspapers (Al-Ahram, Al-Masry Al-Youm, and Al-Dustour) Zeinab Ibrahim concluded that the total number of headlines in Egyptian Arabic in each newspaper varied. Al-Ahram did not include any. Al-Masry Al-Youm had an average of 5% of headlines in Egyptian, while Al-Dustour averaged 11%.

As the status of Egyptian Arabic as opposed to Classical Arabic can have such political and religious implications in Egypt, the question of whether Egyptian Arabic should be considered a "dialect" or "language" can be a source of debate. In sociolinguistics, Egyptian Arabic can be seen as one of many distinct varieties that, despite arguably being languages on abstand grounds, are united by a common Dachsprache in Modern Standard Arabic (MSA).

== Publications ==
During the early 1900s many portions of the Bible were published in Egyptian Arabic. These were published by the Nile Mission Press. By 1932 the whole New Testament and some books of the Old Testament had been published in Egyptian Arabic in Arabic script.

The dialogs in the following novels are partly in Egyptian Arabic, partly in Standard Arabic: Mahmud Tahir Haqqi's Adhra' Dinshuway (Arabic: عذراء دنشواي; 1906), Yaqub Sarruf's Fatat Misr (Arabic: فتاة مصر, romanized: Fatāt Miṣr; first published in Al-Muqtataf 1905–1906), and Mohammed Hussein Heikal's Zaynab (1914).

Early stage plays written in Egyptian Arabic were translated from or influenced by European playwrights. Muhammad 'Uthman Jalal translated plays by Molière, Jean Racine and Carlo Goldoni to Egyptian Arabic and adapted them as well as ten fables by Jean de La Fontaine. Yaqub Sanu translated to and wrote plays on himself in Egyptian Arabic. Many plays were written in Standard Arabic, but performed in colloquial Arabic. Tawfiq al-Hakim took this a step further and provided for his Standard Arabic plays versions in colloquial Arabic for the performances. Mahmud Taymur has published some of his plays in two versions, one in Standard, one in colloquial Arabic, among them: Kidb fi Kidb (Arabic: كذب في كذب, lit. 'All lies', 1951 or ca. 1952) and Al-Muzayyifun (Arabic: المزيفون, romanized: Al-Muzayyifūn, lit. 'The Forgers', ca. 1953).

The writers of stage plays in Egyptian Arabic after the Egyptian Revolution of 1952 include No'man Ashour, Alfred Farag, Saad Eddin Wahba, Rashad Roushdy, and Yusuf Idris. Thereafter the use of colloquial Egyptian Arabic in theater is stable and common. Later writers of plays in colloquial Egyptian include Ali Salem, and Naguib Surur.

Novels in Egyptian Arabic after the 1940s and before the 1990s are rare. There are by Mustafa Musharrafah Qantarah Alladhi Kafar (قنطرة الذي كفر, Qanṭarah Alladhī Kafar, 'Qantara Who Disbelieved', Cairo, 1965) and Uthman Sabri's (Arabic: عثمان صبري, romanized: ʻUthmān Ṣabrī; 1896–1986) Journey on the Nile (Egyptian Arabic: رحلة في النيل, romanized: Riḥlah fī il-Nīl, 1965) (and his Bet Sirri (بيت سري, Bēt Sirri, 'A Brothel', 1981) that apparently uses a mix of Standard Arabic and Egyptian Arabic).

Prose published in Egyptian Arabic since the 1990s include the following novels: Yusuf al-Qa'id's Laban il-Asfur (لبن العصفور, Laban il-ʿAṣfūr, 'The Milk of the Bird'; 1994), Baha' Awwad's (Arabic: بهاء عواد, romanized: Bahāʾ ʿAwwād) Shams il-Asil (شمس الاصيل, Shams il-ʿAṣīl, 'Late Afternoon Sun'; 1998), Safa Abdel Al Moneim's Min Halawit il-Ruh (من حلاوة الروح, Min Ḥalāwit il-Rōḥ, 'Zest for Life', 1998), Samih Faraj's (Arabic: سامح فرج, romanized: Sāmiḥ Faraj) Banhuf Ishtirasa (بانهوف اشتراسا, Bānhūf Ishtirāsā, 'Bahnhof Strasse', 1999); autobiographies include the one by Ahmed Fouad Negm, by Mohammed Naser Ali Ula Awwil (اولى أول, Ūlá Awwil, 'First Class Primary School'), and Fathia al-Assal's Hudn il-Umr (حضن العمر, Ḥuḍn il-ʿUmr, 'The Embrace of a Lifetime').

The epistolary novel Jawabat Haraji il-Gutt (Sa'idi Arabic: جوابات حراجى القط, romanized: Jawābāt Ḥarājī il-Guṭṭ, lit. 'Letters of Haraji the Cat', 2001) by Abdel Rahman el-Abnudi is exceptional in its use of Saʽidi Arabic.

21st-century journals publishing in Egyptian Arabic include Bārti (from at least 2002), the weekly magazine Idhak lil-Dunya (اضحك للدنيا, Iḍḥak lil-Dunyā, 'Smile for the World', from 2005), and the monthly magazine Ihna (احنا, Iḥna, 'We', from 2005). In the 21st century the number of books published in Egyptian Arabic has increased a lot. Many of them are by female authors, for example I Want to Get Married! (عايزه أتجوز, ʻĀyzah atgawwiz, 2008) by Ghada Abdel Aal and She Must Have Travelled (شكلها سافرت, Shaklahā sāfarit, 2016) by Soha Elfeqy.

== Spoken varieties ==
Saʽidi Arabic is a sub-dialect of Egyptian Arabic spoken primarily in Upper Egypt. It carries little prestige nationally but continues to be widely spoken.

The traditional division between Upper and Lower Egypt and their respective differences go back to ancient times. Egyptians today commonly refer to people from the Delta as Baharwa (بحاروة) and those from the south as Sa’ayda (صعايدة). The differences throughout Egypt, however, are more wide-ranging and do not neatly correspond to the simple division. Despite the differences, there are features distinguishing all the Egyptian Arabic varieties of the Nile Valley from any other varieties of Arabic. Such features include reduction of long vowels in open and unstressed syllables, the postposition of demonstratives and interrogatives, the modal meaning of the imperfect and the integration of the participle.

The Western Egyptian Bedawi Arabic variety of the western desert differs from all other Arabic varieties in Egypt in that it linguistically is part of Maghrebi Arabic. Northwest Arabian Arabic is also distinct from Egyptian Arabic.

=== Regional variations ===
Egyptian Arabic varies regionally across its sprachraum, with certain characteristics being noted as typical of the speech of certain regions.

==== Alexandria ====
The dialect of Alexandria (West Delta) is noted for certain shibboleths separating its speech from that of Cairo (South Delta). The ones that are most frequently noted in popular discourse are the use of the word falafel as opposed to طعميّة taʿmiyya for the fava-bean fritters common across the country and the pronunciation of the word for the Egyptian pound (جنيه ginēh [ɡeˈneː]), as [ˈɡeni], closer to the pronunciation of the origin of the term, the British guinea). The speech of the older Alexandrians is also noted for use of the same pre-syllable (ne-) in the singular and plural of the first person present and future tenses, which is also a common feature of Tunisian Arabic and of Maghrebi Arabic in general. The dialects of the western Delta tend to use the perfect with /a/ instead of the perfect with /i/, for example for فهم this is faham instead of fihim. Other examples for this are لَبَس, labas, 'to wear', نَزَل, nazal, 'to descend', شَرَب, sharab, 'to drink', نَسَى, nasá, 'to forget', رَجَع, طَلَع, رَكَب.

==== Port Said ====
Port Said's dialect (East Delta) is noted for a "heavier", more guttural sound, compared to other regions of the country.

==== Rural Nile Delta ====
The dialect of Rural Nile Delta in Northern Egypt is noted for a distinct accent, replacing the urban pronunciations of /ɡ/ (spelled ج gīm) and /q/ (ق qāf) with [ʒ] and [ɡ] respectively, but that is not true of all rural dialects, some of them do not have such replacement. The dialect also has many grammatical differences when contrasted to urban dialects.

== Phonology ==
Egyptian Arabic has a phonology that differs significantly from that of other varieties of Arabic, and has its own inventory of consonants and vowels.

== Morphology ==
=== Nouns ===
In contrast to CA and MSA, but like all modern colloquial varieties of Arabic, Egyptian Arabic nouns are not inflected for case and lack nunation (with the exception of certain fixed phrases in the accusative case, such as شكراً [ˈʃokɾɑn], "thank you"). As all nouns take their pausal forms, singular words and broken plurals simply lose their case endings. In sound plurals and dual forms, where, in MSA, difference in case is present even in pausal forms, the genitive/accusative form is the one preserved. Fixed expressions in the construct state beginning in abu, often geographic names, retain their -u in all cases.

==== Plurals ====
Nouns take either a sound plural or broken plural. The sound plural is formed by adding endings, and can be considered part of the declension. For the broken plural, however, a different pattern for the stem is used. The sound plural with the suffix ـِين, -īn is used for nouns referring to male persons that are participles or follow the pattern CaCCaaC. It takes the form ـيِين, -yīn for nouns of the form CaCCa and the form ـيِّين, -yyīn for nisba adjectives.

Most common broken plural patterns
Singular	Plural	Notes	Examples
CVCCVC(a)	CaCaaCiC	any four-consonant noun with short second vowel	maktab, makaatib "desk, office"; markib, maraakib "boat"; maṭbax, maṭaabix "kitchen"; masʔala, masaaʔil "matter"; maṭṛaḥ, maṭaaṛiḥ "place"; masṛaḥ, masaaṛiḥ "theater"; tazkaṛa, tazaakir "ticket"; ʔiswira, ʔasaawir "bracelet"; muʃkila, maʃaakil "problem"; muulid, mawaalid "(holy) birthday"; maktaba, makaatib "stationary";
CVCCVVC(a)	CaCaCiiC	any four-consonant noun with long second vowel	fustaan, fasatiin "dress"; muftaaḥ, mafatiiḥ "key"; fingaan, fanagiin "cup"; sikkiina, sakakiin "knife"; tamriin, tamariin "exercise"; siggaada, sagagiid "carpet"; magmuuʕ, magamiiʕ "total"; maṣruuf, maṣaṛiif "expense"; miskiin, masakiin "poor, pitiable"
CaC(i)C, CiCC, CeeC (< *CayC)	CuCuuC	very common for three-consonant nouns	dars, duruus "lesson"; daxl, duxuul "income"; daʔn, duʔuun "chin"; ḍeef, ḍuyuuf "guest"; ḍirṣ, ḍuruuṣ "molar tooth"; fann, funuun "art"; farʔ, furuuʔ "difference"; faṣl, fuṣuul "class, chapter"; geeb, guyuub "pocket"; geeʃ, guyuuʃ "army"; gild, guluud "leather"; ḥall, ḥuluul "solution"; ḥarb, ḥuruub "war"; ḥaʔʔ, ḥuʔuuʔ "right"; malik, muluuk "king"
CaC(a)C, CiCC, CuCC, CooC (< *CawC)	ʔaCCaaC	very common for three-consonant words	durg, ʔadraag "drawer"; duʃʃ, ʔadʃaaʃ "shower"; film, ʔaflaam "film"; miʃṭ, ʔamʃaaṭ "comb"; mitr, ʔamtaar "meter"; gism, ʔagsaam "body"; guzʔ, ʔagzaaʔ "part"; muxx, ʔamxaax "brain"; nahṛ, ʔanhaaṛ "river"; door, ʔadwaaṛ "(one's) turn, floor (of building)"; nooʕ, ʔanwaaʕ "kind, sort"; yoom, ʔayyaam "day"; nuṣṣ, ʔanṣaaṣ "half"; waʔt, ʔawʔaat "time"; faṛaḥ, ʔafṛaaḥ "joy, wedding"; gaṛas, ʔagṛaas "bell"; maṭaṛ, ʔamṭaaṛ "rain"; taman, ʔatmaan "price"; walad, ʔawlaad "boy"
CaaC, CuuC	ʔaCwaaC	variant of previous	ḥaal, ʔaḥwaal "state, condition"; nuur, ʔanwaaṛ "light"
CaCCa, CooCa (< *CawCa)	CiCaC, CuCaC	CaCCa < Classical CaCCa (not CaaCiCa)	gazma, gizam "shoe"; dawla, duwal "state, country"; ḥalla, ḥilal "pot"; ʃooka, ʃuwak "fork"; taxta, tuxat "blackboard"
CiCCa	CiCaC		ḥiṣṣa, ḥiṣaṣ "allotment"; ḥiṭṭa, ḥiṭaṭ "piece"; minḥa, minaḥ "scholarship"; nimra, nimar "number"; qiṣṣa, qiṣaṣ "story"
CuCCa	CuCaC		fuṛma, fuṛam "shape, form"; fuṛṣa, fuṛaṣ "chance"; fusḥa, fusaḥ "excursion"; fuuṭa, fuwaṭ "towel"; nukta, nukat "joke"; ʔuṭṭa, ʔuṭaṭ "cat"; mudda, mudad "period (of time)"
CVCVVC(a)	CaCaayiC	three-consonant roots with long second vowel	sigaaṛa, sagaayir "cigarette"; gariida, gaṛaayid "newspaper"; gimiil, gamaayil "favor"; ḥabiib, ḥabaayib "lover"; ḥariiʔa, ḥaraayiʔ "destructive fire"; ḥaʔiiʔa, ḥaʔaayiʔ "fact, truth"; natiiga, nataayig "result"; xaṛiiṭa, xaṛaayiṭ "map"; zibuun, zabaayin "customer"
CaaCiC, CaCCa	CawaaCiC	CaCCa < Classical CaaCiCa (not CaCCa)	ḥaamil, ḥawaamil "pregnant"; haanim, hawaanim "lady"; gaamiʕ, gawaamiʕ "mosque"; maaniʕ, mawaaniʕ "obstacle"; fakha, fawaakih "fruit"; ḥadsa, ḥawaadis "accident"; fayda, fawaayid "benefit"; ʃaariʕ, ʃawaariʕ "street"; xaatim, xawaatim "ring"
CaaCiC	CuCCaaC	mostly occupational nouns	kaatib, kuttaab "writer"; saakin, sukkaan "inhabitant"; saayiḥ, suyyaaḥ "tourist";
CaCiiC	CuCaCa	adjectives and occupational nouns	faʔiir, fuʔaṛa "poor"; nabiih, nubaha "intelligent"; naʃiiṭ, nuʃaṭa "active"; raʔiis, ruʔasa "president"; safiir, sufaṛa "ambassador"; waziir, wuzaṛa "minister"; xabiir, xubaṛa "expert"; ṭaalib, ṭalaba "student"
CaCiiC/CiCiiC	CuCaaC	adjectives	gamiil, gumaal "beautiful"; naʃiiṭ, nuʃaaṭ "active"; niḍiif, nuḍaaf "clean"; tixiin, tuxaan "fat"

Secondary broken plural patterns
Singular	Plural	Notes	Examples
CVCCVVC	CaCaCCa	occupational nouns	tilmiiz, talamza "student"; ʔustaaz, ʔasatza "teacher"; simsaaṛ, samasṛa "broker"; duktoor, dakatra "doctor"
CaCVVC	CawaaCiiC		qamuus, qawamiis "dictionary"; maʕaad, mawaʕiid "appointment"; ṭabuuṛ, ṭawabiiṛ "line, queue"; meʃwar, maʃaweer "walk, appointment"
CaCaC	CiCaaC		gamal, gimaal "camel"; gabal, gibaal "mountain, hill"
CaCC	ʔaCCuC		ʃahṛ, ʔaʃhur "month"
CiCaaC, CaCiiC(a)	CuCuC		kitaab, kutub "book"; madiina, mudun "city"
CaCC(a)	CaCaaCi		maʕna, maʕaani "meaning"; makwa, makaawi "iron"; ʔahwa, ʔahaawi "coffee"; ʔaṛḍ, ʔaṛaaḍi "ground, land"
CaaCa, CaaCi, CaCya	CawaaCi		ḥaaṛa, ḥawaaṛi "alley"; naadi, nawaadi "club"; naḥya, nawaaḥi "side"
CaCaC, CiCaaC	ʔaCCiCa/ʔiCCiCa		ḥizaam, ʔaḥzima "belt"; masal, ʔamsila "example"; sabat, ʔisbita "basket"
CiCiyya	CaCaaya		hidiyya, hadaaya "gift"
CaaC	CiCaaC		faaṛ, firaan "mouse"; gaaṛ, giraan "neighbor"; xaal, xilaan "maternal uncle"

==== Color/defect nouns ====
Examples of "color and defect" nouns
Meaning	(template)	green	blue	black	white	deaf	blind	one-eyed
Masculine	**ʔaCCaC**	ʔaxḍaṛ	ʔazraʔ	ʔiswid	ʔabyaḍ	ʔaṭṛaʃ	ʔaʕma	ʔaʕwaṛ
Feminine	**CaCCa**	xaḍṛa	zarʔa	sooda	beeḍa	ṭaṛʃa	ʕamya	ʕooṛa
Plural	**CuCC**	xuḍr	zurʔ	suud	biiḍ	ṭurʃ	ʕumy	ʕuur

A common set of nouns referring to colors, as well as a number of nouns referring to physical defects of various sorts (ʔaṣlaʕ "bald"; ʔaṭṛaʃ "deaf"; ʔaxṛas "dumb"), take a special inflectional pattern, as shown in the table. Only a small number of common colors inflect this way: ʔaḥmaṛ "red"; ʔazraʔ "blue"; ʔaxḍaṛ "green"; ʔaṣfaṛ "yellow"; ʔabyaḍ "white"; ʔiswid "black"; ʔasmaṛ "brown-skinned, brunette"; ʔaʃʔaṛ "blond(e)". The remaining colors are invariable, and mostly so-called nisba adjectives derived from colored objects: bunni "brown" (< bunn "coffee powder"); ṛamaadi "gray" (< ṛamaad "ashes"); banafsigi "purple" (< banafsig "violet"); burtuʔaani "orange" (< burtuʔaan "oranges"); zibiibi "maroon" (< zibiib "raisins"); etc., or of foreign origin: beeع "beige" from the French; bamba "pink" from Turkish pembe.

==== Verbal nouns of form I ====
Verbal nouns of form I are not regular. The following table lists common patterns.

Verbal noun of form I patterns
Pattern	Template	Example(s)
فَعْل faʿl	CVCC	ضرب, ḍarb, 'striking'
فَعْلَة faʿla	CVCCa	
فِعْل fiʿl	CVCC	
فِعْلَة fiʿla	CVCCa	
فُعْل fuʿl	CVCC	
فُعْلَة fuʿla	CVCCa	
فَعَل faʿal	CVCVC	
فَعَلَة faʿala	CVCVCa	
فَعَال faʿāl	CVCVVC	
فَعَالَة faʿāla	CVCVVCa	
فِعَال fiʿāl	CVCVVC	
فِعَالَة fiʿāla	CVCVVCa	كتابة, kitāba, 'writing'
فُعَال fuʿāl	CVCVVC	
فَعُول faʿūl	CVCVVC	
فُعُول fuʿūl	CVCVVC	
فُعُولَة fuʿūla	CVCVVCa	
فَعِيل faʿīl	CVCVVC	
فِعْلَان fiʿlān	CVCCaan	
فُعْلَان fuʿlān	CVCCaan	
فَعَلَان faʿalān	CVCVCaan	
مَفْعَل mafʿal	maCCVC	
مَفْعِلَة mafʿila	maCCVCa	
مَفَعَّة mafaʿʿa	maCVCCa	
مَفَال mafāl	maCVVC	
مَفِيل mafīl	maCVVC	
فَوْل fōl	CVVC	
فَعَالِيَّة faʿaliyya	CVCVCiyya	
فِعَى fiʿa	CVCa	

=== Pronouns ===
Forms of the independent and clitic pronouns
Meaning	Subject	Direct object/Possessive									Indirect object					
Meaning	Subject	After vowel			After 1 cons.			After 2 cons.			After vowel		After 1 cons.		After 2 cons.	
Meaning	Subject	Normal	+ ʃ	+ l-	Normal	+ ʃ	+ l-	Normal	+ ʃ	+ l-	Normal	+ ʃ	Normal	+ ʃ	Normal	+ ʃ
"my" (nominal)	—	́ya			-i						—					
"I/me" (verbal)	ána	́ni						-íni			́li				-íli	
"you(r) (masc.)"	ínta	́k			-ak						́lak				-ílak	
"you(r) (fem.)"	ínti	́ki			-ik	-ki		-ik	-iki		́lik	-lkí	-lik	-likí	-ílik	-ilkí
"he/him/his"	huwwa	́	-hu		-u		-hu	-u		-uhu	́lu				-ílu	
"she/her"	hiyya	́ha						-áha			́lha		-láha		-ílha	
"we/us/our"	íḥna	́na						-ína			́lna		-lína		-ílna	
"you(r) (pl.)"	íntu	́ku(m)						-úku(m)			́lku(m)		-lúku(m)		-ílku(m)	
"they/them/their"	humma	́hum						-úhum			́lhum		-lúhum		-ílhum	

Examples of possessive constructs
Base Word	béet "house"	biyúut "houses"	bánk "bank"	sikkíina "knife"	máṛa "wife"	ʔább "father"	ʔidéen "hands"
Construct Base	béet-	biyúut-	bánk-	sikkíin(i)t-	miṛáat-	ʔabúu-	ʔidée-
"my ..."	béet-i	biyúut-i	bánk-i	sikkínt-i	miṛáat-i	ʔabúu-ya	ʔidáy-ya
"your (masc.) ..."	béet-ak	biyúut-ak	bánk-ak	sikkínt-ak	miṛáat-ak	ʔabúu-k	ʔidée-k
"your (fem.) ..."	béet-ik	biyúut-ik	bánk-ik	sikkínt-ik	miṛáat-ik	ʔabúu-ki	ʔidée-ki
"his ..."	béet-u	biyúut-u	bánk-u	sikkínt-u	miṛáat-u	ʔabúu-(h)	ʔidée-(h)
"her ..."	bét-ha	biyút-ha	bank-áha	sikkinít-ha	miṛát-ha	ʔabúu-ha	ʔidée-ha
"our ..."	bét-na	biyút-na	bank-ína	sikkinít-na	miṛát-na	ʔabúu-na	ʔidée-na
"your (pl.) ..."	bét-ku(m)	biyút-ku(m)	bank-úku(m)	sikkinít-ku(m)	miṛát-ku(m)	ʔabúu-ku(m)	ʔidée-ku(m)
"their ..."	bét-hum	biyút-hum	bank-úhum	sikkinít-hum	miṛát-hum	ʔabúu-hum	ʔidée-hum

Suffixed prepositions
Base Word	fi "in"	bi "by, in, with"	li "to"	wayya "with"	ʕala "on"	ʕand "in the possession of, to have"	min "from"
"... me"	fíy-ya	bíy-ya	líy-ya	wayyáa-ya	ʕaláy-ya	ʕánd-i	mínn-i
"... you (masc.)"	fíi-k	bíi-k	líi-k, l-ak	wayyáa-k	ʕalée-k	ʕánd-ak	mínn-ak
"... you (fem.)"	fíi-ki	bíi-ki	líi-ki, li-ki	wayyáa-ki	ʕalée-ki	ʕánd-ik	mínn-ik
"... him"	fíi-(h)	bíi-(h)	líi-(h), l-u(h)	wayyáa-(h)	ʕalée-(h)	ʕánd-u	mínn-u
"... her"	fíi-ha	bíi-ha	líi-ha, la-ha	wayyáa-ha	ʕalée-ha	ʕand-áha	minn-áha, mín-ha
"... us"	fíi-na	bíi-na	líi-na, li-na	wayyáa-na	ʕalée-na	ʕand-ína	minn-ína
"... you (pl.)"	fíi-ku(m)	bíi-ku(m)	líi-ku(m), li-ku(m)	wayyáa-ku(m)	ʕalée-ku(m)	ʕand-úku(m)	minn-úku(m), mín-ku(m)
"... them"	fíi-hum	bíi-hum	líi-hum, li-hum	wayyáa-hum	ʕalée-hum	ʕand-úhum	minn-úhum, mín-hum

Egyptian Arabic object pronouns are clitics, in that they attach to the end of a noun, verb, or preposition, with the result forming a single phonological word rather than separate words. Clitics can be attached to the following types of words:

- A clitic pronoun attached to a noun indicates possession: béet "house", béet-i "my house"; sikkíina "knife", sikkínt-i "my knife"; ʔább "father", ʔabúu-ya "my father". The form of a pronoun may vary depending on the phonological form of the word being attached to (ending with a vowel or with one or two consonants), and the noun being attached to may also have a separate "construct" form before possessive clitic suffixes.
- A clitic pronoun attached to a preposition indicates the object of the preposition: minno "from it (masculine object)", ʕaleyha "on it (feminine object)"
- A clitic pronoun attached to a verb indicates the object of the verb: ʃúft "I saw", ʃúft-u "I saw him", ʃuft-áha "I saw her".

With verbs, indirect object clitic pronouns can be formed using the preposition li- plus a clitic. Both direct and indirect object clitic pronouns can be attached to a single verb: agíib "I bring", agíb-hu "I bring it", agib-húu-lik "I bring it to you", m-agib-hu-lkíi-ʃ "I do not bring it to you".

=== Verbs ===
Verbs in Arabic are based on a stem made up of three or four consonants. The set of consonants communicates the basic meaning of a verb. Changes to the vowels in between the consonants, along with prefixes and/or suffixes, specify grammatical functions such as tense, person, and number, in addition to changes in the meaning of the verb that embody grammatical concepts such as causative, intensive, passive or reflexive.

Each particular lexical verb is specified by two stems, one used for the past tense and one used for non-past tenses along with subjunctive and imperative moods. To the former stem, suffixes are added to mark the verb for person, number, and gender, while to the latter stem, a combination of prefixes and suffixes are added. (Very approximately, the prefixes specify the person and the suffixes indicate number and gender.) Since Arabic lacks an infinitive, the third person masculine singular past tense form serves as the "dictionary form" used to identify a verb. For example, the verb meaning "write" is often specified as kátab, which actually means "he wrote". In the paradigms below, a verb will be specified as kátab/yíktib (where kátab means "he wrote" and yíktib means "he writes"), indicating the past stem (katab-) and non-past stem (-ktib-, obtained by removing the prefix yi-).

The verb classes in Arabic are formed along two axes. One axis (described as "form I", "form II", etc.) is used to specify grammatical concepts such as causative, intensive, passive, or reflexive, and involves varying the stem form. For example, from the root K-T-B "write" is derived form I kátab/yíktib "write", form II káttib/yikáttib "cause to write", form III ká:tib/yiká:tib "correspond", etc. The other axis is determined by the particular consonants making up the root. For example, defective verbs have a W or Y as the last root consonant, which is often reflected in paradigms with an extra final vowel in the stem (e.g. ráma/yírmi "throw" from R-M-Y); meanwhile, hollow verbs have a W or Y as the middle root consonant, and the stems of such verbs appear to have only two consonants (e.g. gá:b/yigí:b "bring" from G-Y-B).

==== Strong verbs ====
Strong verbs are those that have no "weakness" (e.g. W or Y) in the root consonants. Each verb has a given vowel pattern for Past (a or i) and Present (a or i or u). Combinations of each exist.

===== Regular verbs, form I =====
Form I verbs have a given vowel pattern for past (a or i) and present (a, i or u). Combinations of each exist:

Vowel patterns		Example
Past	Present	Example
a	a	ḍár**a**b – yíḍr**a**b to beat
a	i	kát**a**b – yíkt**i**b to write
a	u	ṭál**a**b – yíṭl**u**b~yúṭl**u**b to order, to demand
i	a	fíh**i**m – yífh**a**m to understand
i	i	mis**i**k – yíms**i**k to hold, to touch
i	u	sik**i**t – yísk**u**t~yúsk**u**t to be silent, to shut up

===== Regular verb, form I, fáʕal/yífʕil =====
Example: kátab/yíktib "write"

Tense/Mood		Past		Present Subjunctive		Present Indicative		Future		Imperative	
Person		Singular	Plural	Singular	Plural	Singular	Plural	Singular	Plural	Singular	Plural
1st		katáb-t	katáb-na	á-ktib	ní-ktib	bá-ktib	bi-ní-ktib	ḥá-ktib	ḥá-ní-ktib		
2nd	masculine	katáb-t	katáb-tu	tí-ktib	ti-ktíb-u	bi-tí-ktib	bi-ti-ktíb-u	ḥa-tí-ktib	ḥa-ti-ktíb-u	í-ktib	i-ktíb-u
2nd	feminine	katáb-ti	katáb-tu	ti-ktíb-i	ti-ktíb-u	bi-ti-ktíb-i	bi-ti-ktíb-u	ḥa-ti-ktíb-i	ḥa-ti-ktíb-u	i-ktíb-i	i-ktíb-u
3rd	masculine	kátab	kátab-u	yí-ktib	yi-ktíb-u	bi-yí-ktib	bi-yi-ktíb-u	ḥa-yí-ktib	ḥa-yi-ktíb-u		
3rd	feminine	kátab-it	kátab-u	tí-ktib	yi-ktíb-u	bi-tí-ktib	bi-yi-ktíb-u	ḥa-tí-ktib	ḥa-yi-ktíb-u		

Note that, in general, the present indicative is formed from the subjunctive by the addition of bi- (bi-a- is elided to ba-). Similarly, the future is formed from the subjunctive by the addition of ḥa- (ḥa-a- is elided to ḥa-). The i in bi- or in the following prefix will be deleted according to the regular rules of vowel syncope:

- **híyya b-tíktib** "she writes" (**híyya** + **bi-** + **tíktib**)
- **híyya bi-t-ʃú:f** "she sees" (**híyya** + **bi-** + **tiʃú:f**)
- **an-áktib** "I write (subjunctive)" (**ána** + **áktib**)

Example: kátab/yíktib "write": non-finite forms

Number/Gender	Active Participle	Passive Participle	Verbal Noun
Masc. Sg.	ká:tib	maktú:b	kitá:ba
Fem. Sg.	kátb-a	maktú:b-a	kitá:ba
Pl.	katb-í:n	maktub-í:n	kitá:ba

===== Regular verb, form I, fíʕil/yífʕal =====
Example: fíhim/yífham "understand"

Tense/Mood		Past		Present Subjunctive		Present Indicative		Future		Imperative	
Person		Singular	Plural	Singular	Plural	Singular	Plural	Singular	Plural	Singular	Plural
1st		fihím-t	fihím-na	á-fham	ní-fham	bá-fham	bi-ní-fham	ḥá-fham	ḥá-ní-fham		
2nd	masculine	fihím-t	fihím-tu	tí-fham	ti-fhám-u	bi-tí-fham	bi-ti-fhám-u	ḥa-tí-fham	ḥa-ti-fhám-u	í-fham	i-fhám-u
2nd	feminine	fihím-ti	fihím-tu	ti-fhám-i	ti-fhám-u	bi-ti-fhám-i	bi-ti-fhám-u	ḥa-ti-fhám-i	ḥa-ti-fhám-u	i-fhám-i	i-fhám-u
3rd	masculine	fíhim	**fíhm-u**	yí-fham	yi-fhám-u	bi-yí-fham	bi-yi-fhám-u	ḥa-yí-fham	ḥa-yi-fhám-u		
3rd	feminine	**fíhm-it**	**fíhm-u**	tí-fham	yi-fhám-u	bi-tí-fham	bi-yi-fhám-u	ḥa-tí-fham	ḥa-yi-fhám-u		

Boldfaced forms fíhm-it and fíhm-u differ from the corresponding forms of katab (kátab-it and kátab-u due to vowel syncope). Note also the syncope in ána fhím-t "I understood".

===== Regular verb, form II, fáʕʕil/yifáʕʕil =====
Example: dárris/yidárris "teach"

Tense/Mood		Past		Present Subjunctive		Present Indicative		Future		Imperative	
Person		Singular	Plural	Singular	Plural	Singular	Plural	Singular	Plural	Singular	Plural
1st		darrís-t	darrís-na	a-dárris	ni-dárris	ba-dárris	bi-**n-**dárris	ḥa-dárris	ḥa-**n-**dárris		
2nd	masculine	darrís-t	darrís-tu	ti-dárris	ti-darrís-u	bi-**t-**dárris	bi-**t-**darrís-u	ḥa-**t-**dárris	ḥa-**t-**darrís-u	**dárris**	**darrís-u**
2nd	feminine	darrís-ti	darrís-tu	ti-darrís-i	ti-darrís-u	bi-**t-**darrís-i	bi-**t-**darrís-u	ḥa-**t-**darrís-i	ḥa-**t-**darrís-u	**darrís-i**	**darrís-u**
3rd	masculine	dárris	**darrís-u**	yi-dárris	yi-darrís-u	bi-**y-**dárris	bi-**y-**darrís-u	ḥa-**y-**dárris	ḥa-**y-**darrís-u		
3rd	feminine	**darrís-it**	**darrís-u**	ti-dárris	yi-darrís-u	bi-**t-**dárris	bi-**y-**darrís-u	ḥa-**t-**dárris	ḥa-**y-**darrís-u		

Boldfaced forms indicate the primary differences from the corresponding forms of katab:

- The prefixes ti-, yi-, ni- have elision of i following bi- or ḥa- (all verbs whose stem begins with a single consonant behave this way).
- The imperative prefix i- is missing (again, all verbs whose stem begins with a single consonant behave this way).
- Due to the regular operation of the stress rules, the stress in the past tense forms **darrís-it** and **darrís-u** differs from **kátab-it** and **kátab-u**.

===== Regular verb, form III, fá:ʕil/yifá:ʕil =====
Example: sá:fir/yisá:fir "travel"

Tense/Mood		Past		Present Subjunctive		Present Indicative		Future		Imperative	
Person		Singular	Plural	Singular	Plural	Singular	Plural	Singular	Plural	Singular	Plural
1st		**sa**fír-t	**sa**fír-na	a-sá:fir	ni-sá:fir	ba-sá:fir	bi-n-sá:fir	ḥa-sá:fir	ḥa-n-sá:fir		
2nd	masculine	**sa**fír-t	**sa**fír-tu	ti-sá:fir	ti-**sáfr**-u	bi-t-sá:fir	bi-t-**sáfr**-u	ḥa-t-sá:fir	ḥa-t-**sáfr**-u	sá:fir	**sáfr**-u
2nd	feminine	**sa**fír-ti	**sa**fír-tu	ti-**sáfr**-i	ti-**sáfr**-u	bi-t-**sáfr**-i	bi-t-**sáfr**-u	ḥa-t-**sáfr**-i	ḥa-t-**sáfr**-u	**sáfr**-i	**sáfr**-u
3rd	masculine	sá:fir	**sáfr**-u	yi-sá:fir	yi-**sáfr**-u	bi-y-sá:fir	bi-y-**sáfr**-u	ḥa-y-sá:fir	ḥa-y-**sáfr**-u		
3rd	feminine	**sáfr**-it	**sáfr**-u	ti-sá:fir	yi-**sáfr**-u	bi-t-sá:fir	bi-y-**sáfr**-u	ḥa-t-sá:fir	ḥa-y-**sáfr**-u		

The primary differences from the corresponding forms of darris (shown in boldface) are:

- The long vowel a: becomes a when unstressed.
- The i in the stem sa:fir is elided when a suffix beginning with a vowel follows.

==== Defective verbs ====
Defective verbs have a W or Y as the last root consonant.

===== Defective verb, form I, fáʕa/yífʕi =====
Example: ráma/yírmi "throw away" (i.e. trash, etc.)

Tense/Mood		Past		Present Subjunctive		Present Indicative		Future		Imperative	
Person		Singular	Plural	Singular	Plural	Singular	Plural	Singular	Plural	Singular	Plural
1st		ramé:-t	ramé:-na	á-rmi	ní-rmi	bá-rmi	bi-ní-rmi	ḥá-rmi	ḥa-ní-rmi		
2nd	masculine	ramé:-t	ramé:-tu	tí-rmi	**tí-rm**-u	bi-tí-rmi	bi-**tí-rm**-u	ḥa-tí-rmi	ḥa-**tí-rm**-u	í-rmi	**í-rm**-u
2nd	feminine	ramé:-ti	ramé:-tu	**tí-rm**-i	**tí-rm**-u	bi-**tí-rm**-i	bi-**tí-rm**-u	ḥa-**tí-rm**-i	ḥa-**tí-rm**-u	**í-rm**-i	**í-rm**-u
3rd	masculine	ráma	**rám-u**	yí-rmi	**yí-rm**-u	bi-yí-rmi	bi-**yí-rm**-u	ḥa-yí-rmi	ḥa-**yí-rm**-u		
3rd	feminine	**rám**-it	**rám-u**	tí-rmi	**yí-rm**-u	bi-tí-rmi	bi-**yí-rm**-u	ḥa-tí-rmi	ḥa-**yí-rm**-u		

The primary differences from the corresponding forms of katab (shown in boldface) are:

- In the past, there are three stems: **ráma** with no suffix, **ramé:-** with a consonant-initial suffix, **rám-** with a vowel initial suffix.
- In the non-past, the stem **rmi** becomes **rm-** before a (vowel initial) suffix, and the stress remains on the prefix, since the stem vowel has been elided.
- Note also the accidental homonymy between masculine **tí-rmi, í-rmi** and feminine **tí-rm-i, í-rm-i**.

===== Defective verb, form I, fíʕi/yífʕa =====
Example: nísi/yínsa "forget"

Tense/Mood		Past		Present Subjunctive		Present Indicative		Future		Imperative	
Person		Singular	Plural	Singular	Plural	Singular	Plural	Singular	Plural	Singular	Plural
1st		nisí:-t	nisí:-na	á-nsa	ní-nsa	bá-nsa	bi-ní-nsa	ḥá-nsa	ḥa-ní-nsa		
2nd	masculine	nisí:-t	nisí:-tu	tí-nsa	tí-ns-u	bi-tí-nsa	bi-tí-ns-u	ḥa-tí-nsa	ḥa-tí-ns-u	í-nsa	í-ns-u
2nd	feminine	nisí:-ti	nisí:-tu	tí-ns-i	tí-ns-u	bi-tí-ns-i	bi-tí-ns-u	ḥa-tí-ns-i	ḥa-tí-ns-u	í-ns-i	í-ns-u
3rd	masculine	nísi	**nísy-u**	yí-nsa	yí-ns-u	bi-yí-nsa	bi-yí-ns-u	ḥa-yí-nsa	ḥa-yí-ns-u		
3rd	feminine	**nísy**-it	**nísy-u**	tí-nsa	yí-ns-u	bi-tí-nsa	bi-yí-ns-u	ḥa-tí-nsa	ḥa-yí-ns-u		

This verb type is quite similar to the defective verb type ráma/yírmi. The primary differences are:

- The occurrence of i and a in the stems are reversed: i in the past, a in the non-past.
- In the past, instead of the stems **ramé:-** and **rám-**, the verb has **nisí:-** (with a consonant-initial suffix) and **nísy-** (with a vowel initial suffix). Note in particular the |y| in **nísyit** and **nísyu** as opposed to **rámit** and **rámu**.
- Elision of i in **nisí:-** can occur, e.g. **ána nsí:t** "I forgot".
- In the non-past, because the stem has a instead of i, there is no homonymy between masculine **tí-nsa, í-nsa** and feminine **tí-ns-i, í-ns-i**.

Some other verbs have different stem variations, e.g. míʃi/yímʃi "walk" (with i in both stems) and báʔa/yíbʔa "become, remain" (with a in both stems). The verb láʔa/yilá:ʔi "find" is unusual in having a mixture of a form I past and form III present (note also the variations líʔi/yílʔa and láʔa/yílʔa).

Verbs other than form I have consistent stem vowels. All such verbs have a in the past (hence form stems with -é:-, not -í:-). Forms V, VI, X and IIq have a in the present (indicated by boldface below); others have i; forms VII, VIIt, and VIII have i in both vowels of the stem (indicated by italics below); form IX verbs, including "defective" verbs, behave as regular doubled verbs:

- Form II: **wádda/yiwáddi** "take away"; **ʔáwwa/yiʔáwwi** "strengthen"
- Form III: **ná:da/yiná:di** "call"; **dá:wa/yidá:wi** "treat, cure"
- Form IV (rare, classicized): **ʔárḍa/yírḍi** "please, satisfy"
- Form V: **itʔáwwa/yitʔáwwa** "become strong"
- Form VI: **itdá:wa/yitdá:wa** "be treated, be cured"
- Form VII (rare in the Cairene dialect): **inḥáka/yinḥíki** "be told"
- Form VIIt: **itnása/yitnísi** "be forgotten"
- Form VIII: **iʃtára/yiʃtíri** "buy"
- **Form IX** (very rare): **iḥláww/yiḥláww** "be/become sweet"
- Form X: **istákfa/yistákfa** "have enough"
- Form Iq: need example
- Form IIq: need example

==== Hollow verbs ====
Hollow have a W or Y as the middle root consonant. For some forms (e.g. form II and form III), hollow verbs are conjugated as strong verbs (e.g. form II ʕáyyin/yiʕáyyin "appoint" from ʕ-Y-N, form III gá:wib/yigá:wib "answer" from G-W-B).

===== Hollow verb, form I, fá:l/yifí:l =====
Example: gá:b/yigí:b "bring"

Tense/mood		Past		Present subjunctive		Present indicative		Future		Imperative	
Person		Singular	Plural	Singular	Plural	Singular	Plural	Singular	Plural	Singular	Plural
1st		**gíb**-t	**gíb**-na	a-gí:b	ni-gí:b	ba-gí:b	bi-n-gí:b	ḥa-gí:b	ḥa-n-gí:b		
2nd	masculine	**gíb**-t	**gíb**-tu	ti-gí:b	ti-gí:b-u	bi-t-gí:b	bi-t-gí:b-u	ḥa-t-gí:b	ḥa-t-gí:b-u	gí:b	gí:b-u
2nd	feminine	**gíb**-ti	**gíb**-tu	ti-gí:b-i	ti-gí:b-u	bi-t-gí:b-i	bi-t-gí:b-u	ḥa-t-gí:b-i	ḥa-t-gí:b-u	gí:b-i	gí:b-u
3rd	masculine	gá:b	gá:b-u	yi-gí:b	yi-gí:b-u	bi-y-gí:b	bi-y-gí:b-u	ḥa-y-gí:b	ḥa-y-gí:b-u		
3rd	feminine	gá:b-it	gá:b-u	ti-gí:b	yi-gí:b-u	bi-t-gí:b	bi-y-gí:b-u	ḥa-t-gí:b	ḥa-y-gí:b-u		

This verb works much like dárris/yidárris "teach". Like all verbs whose stem begins with a single consonant, the prefixes differ in the following way from those of regular and defective form I verbs:

- The prefixes ti-, yi-, ni- have elision of i following bi- or ḥa-.
- The imperative prefix i- is missing.

In addition, the past tense has two stems: gíb- before consonant-initial suffixes (first and second person) and gá:b- elsewhere (third person).

===== Hollow verb, form I, fá:l/yifú:l =====
Example: ʃá:f/yiʃú:f "see"

Tense/Mood		Past		Present Subjunctive		Present Indicative		Future		Imperative	
Person		Singular	Plural	Singular	Plural	Singular	Plural	Singular	Plural	Singular	Plural
1st		**ʃúf**-t	**ʃúf**-na	a-ʃú:f	ni-ʃú:f	ba-ʃú:f	bi-n-ʃú:f	ḥa-ʃú:f	ḥa-n-ʃú:f		
2nd	masculine	**ʃúf**-t	**ʃúf**-tu	ti-ʃú:f	ti-ʃú:f-u	bi-t-ʃú:f	bi-t-ʃú:f-u	ḥa-t-ʃú:f	ḥa-t-ʃú:f-u	ʃú:f	ʃú:f-u
2nd	feminine	**ʃúf**-ti	**ʃúf**-tu	ti-ʃú:f-i	ti-ʃú:f-u	bi-t-ʃú:f-i	bi-t-ʃú:f-u	ḥa-t-ʃú:f-i	ḥa-t-ʃú:f-u	ʃú:f-i	ʃú:f-u
3rd	masculine	ʃá:f	ʃá:f-u	yi-ʃú:f	yi-ʃú:f-u	bi-y-ʃú:f	bi-y-ʃú:f-u	ḥa-y-ʃú:f	ḥa-y-ʃú:f-u		
3rd	feminine	ʃá:f-it	ʃá:f-u	ti-ʃú:f	yi-ʃú:f-u	bi-t-ʃú:f	bi-y-ʃú:f-u	ḥa-t-ʃú:f	ḥa-y-ʃú:f-u		

This verb class is identical to verbs such as gá:b/yigí:b except in having stem vowel u in place of i.

==== Doubled verbs ====
Doubled verbs have the same consonant as middle and last root consonant, e.g. ḥább/yiḥíbb "love" from Ḥ-B-B.

===== Doubled verb, form I, fáʕʕ/yifíʕʕ =====
Example: ḥább/yiḥíbb "love"

Tense/Mood		Past		Present Subjunctive		Present Indicative		Future		Imperative	
Person		Singular	Plural	Singular	Plural	Singular	Plural	Singular	Plural	Singular	Plural
1st		ḥabbé:-t	ḥabbé:-na	a-ḥíbb	ni-ḥíbb	ba-ḥíbb	bi-n-ḥíbb	ḥa-ḥíbb	ḥa-n-ḥíbb		
2nd	masculine	ḥabbé:-t	ḥabbé:-tu	ti-ḥíbb	ti-ḥíbb-u	bi-t-ḥíbb	bi-t-ḥíbb-u	ḥa-t-ḥíbb	ḥa-t-ḥíbb-u	ḥíbb	ḥíbb-u
2nd	feminine	ḥabbé:-ti	ḥabbé:-tu	ti-ḥíbb-i	ti-ḥíbb-u	bi-t-ḥíbb-i	bi-t-ḥíbb-u	ḥa-t-ḥíbb-i	ḥa-t-ḥíbb-u	ḥíbb-i	ḥíbb-u
3rd	masculine	ḥább	ḥább-u	yi-ḥíbb	yi-ḥíbb-u	bi-y-ḥíbb	bi-y-ḥíbb-u	ḥa-y-ḥíbb	ḥa-y-ḥíbb-u		
3rd	feminine	ḥább-it	ḥább-u	ti-ḥíbb	yi-ḥíbb-u	bi-t-ḥíbb	bi-y-ḥíbb-u	ḥa-t-ḥíbb	ḥa-y-ḥíbb-u		

This verb works much like gá:b/yigí:b "bring". Like that class, it has two stems in the past, which are ḥabbé:- before consonant-initial suffixes (first and second person) and ḥább- elsewhere (third person). é:- was borrowed from the defective verbs; the Classical Arabic equivalent form would be *ḥabáb-, e.g. *ḥabáb-t.

Other verbs have u or a in the present stem: baṣṣ/yibúṣṣ "to look", ṣaḥḥ/yiṣáḥḥ "be right, be proper".

As for the other forms:

- Form II, V doubled verbs are strong: **ḥáddid/yiḥáddid** "limit, fix (appointment)"
- Form III, IV, VI, VIII doubled verbs seem non-existent
- Form VII and VIIt doubled verbs (same stem vowel a in both stems): **inbáll/yinbáll** "be wetted", **itʕádd/yitʕádd**
- Form VIII doubled verbs (same stem vowel a in both stems): **ihtámm/yihtámm** "be interested (in)"
- Form IX verbs (automatically behave as "doubled" verbs, same stem vowel a in both stems): **iḥmárr/yiḥmárr** "be red, blush", **iḥláww/yiḥláww** "be sweet"
- Form X verbs (stem vowel either a or i in non-past): **istaḥáʔʔ/yistaḥáʔʔ** "deserve" vs. **istaʕádd/yistaʕídd** "be ready", **istamárr/yistamírr** "continue".

==== Assimilated verbs ====
Assimilated verbs have W or Y as the first root consonant. Most of these verbs have been regularized in Egyptian Arabic, e.g. wázan/yíwzin "to weigh" or wíṣíl/yíwṣal "to arrive". Only a couple of irregular verbs remain, e.g. wíʔif/yúʔaf "stop" and wíʔiʕ/yúʔaʕ "fall" (see below).

==== Doubly weak verbs ====
"Doubly weak" verbs have more than one "weakness", typically a W or Y as both the second and third consonants. This term is in fact a misnomer, as such verbs actually behave as normal defective verbs (e.g. káwa/yíkwi "iron (clothes)" from K-W-Y, ʔáwwa/yiʔáwwi "strengthen" from ʔ-W-Y, dá:wa/yidá:wi "treat, cure" from D-W-Y).

==== Irregular verbs ====
The irregular verbs are as follows:

- **ídda/yíddi** "give" (endings like a normal defective verb)
- **wíʔif/yúʔaf** "stop" and **wíʔiʕ/yúʔaʕ** "fall" (áʔaf, báʔaf, ḥáʔaf "I (will) stop"; úʔaf "stop!")
- **kal/yá:kul** "eat" and **xad/yá:xud** "take" (kalt, kal, kálit, kálu "I/he/she/they ate", also regular ákal, etc. "he/etc. ate"; á:kul, bá:kul, ḥá:kul "I (will) eat", yáklu "they eat"; kúl, kúli, kúlu "eat!"; wá:kil "eating"; mittá:kil "eaten")
- **gé/yí:gi** "come". This verb is extremely irregular (with particularly unusual forms in boldface):

Tense/Mood		Past		Present Subjunctive		Imperative	
Person		Singular	Plural	Singular	Plural	Singular	Plural
1st		gé:-t or gí:-t	gé:-na or gí:-na	á:-gi	ní:-gi		
2nd	masculine	gé:-t or gí:-t	gé:-tu or gí:-tu	tí:-gi	tí:-g-u	**taʕá:la**	**taʕá:l-u**
2nd	feminine	gé:-ti or gí:-ti	gé:-tu or gí:-tu	tí:-g-i	tí:-g-u	**taʕá:l-i**	**taʕá:l-u**
3rd	masculine	**gé** or **gá** (also **ʔíga**) gá:-ni (or -li)   "he came to me"   but not *gé:-ni	**gum** but gú:-ni (or -li)   "they came to me" and   magú:-ʃ "they didn't come"	yí:-gi	yí:-g-u		
3rd	feminine	**gat** (also **ʔígat**)	**gum** but gú:-ni (or -li)   "they came to me" and   magú:-ʃ "they didn't come"	tí:-gi	yí:-g-u		

Example: gé/yí:gi "come": non-finite forms

Number/Gender	Active Participle	Verbal Noun
Masc. Sg.	**gayy**	**nigíyy**
Fem. Sg.	**gáyy**-a	**nigíyy**
Pl.	**gayy**-í:n	**nigíyy**

==== Table of verb forms ====
In this section all verb classes and their corresponding stems are listed, excluding the small number of irregular verbs described above. Verb roots are indicated schematically using capital letters to stand for consonants in the root:

- F = first consonant of root
- M = middle consonant of three-consonant root
- S = second consonant of four-consonant root
- T = third consonant of four-consonant root
- L = last consonant of root

Hence, the root F-M-L stands for all three-consonant roots, and F-S-T-L stands for all four-consonant roots. (Traditional Arabic grammar uses F-ʕ-L and F-ʕ-L-L, respectively, but the system used here appears in a number of grammars of spoken Arabic dialects and is probably less confusing for English speakers, since the forms are easier to pronounce than those involving ʕ.)

The following table lists the prefixes and suffixes to be added to mark tense, person, number and gender, and the stem form to which they are added. The forms involving a vowel-initial suffix, and corresponding stem PA_{v} or NP_{v}, are highlighted in silver. The forms involving a consonant-initial suffix, and corresponding stem PA_{c}, are highlighted in gold. The forms involving a no suffix, and corresponding stem PA_{0} or NP_{0}, are unhighlighted.

Tense/Mood		Past		Non-Past	
Person		Singular	Plural	Singular	Plural
1st		PA_{c}-**t**	PA_{c}-**na**	**a**-NP_{0}	**ni**-NP_{0}
2nd	masculine	PA_{c}-**t**	PA_{c}-**tu**	**ti**-NP_{0}	**ti**-NP_{v}-**u**
2nd	feminine	PA_{c}-**ti**	PA_{c}-**tu**	**ti**-NP_{v}-**i**	**ti**-NP_{v}-**u**
3rd	masculine	PA_{0}	PA_{v}-**u**	**yi**-NP_{0}	**yi**-NP_{v}-**u**
3rd	feminine	PA_{v}-**it**	PA_{v}-**u**	**ti**-NP_{0}	**yi**-NP_{v}-**u**

The following table lists the verb classes along with the form of the past and non-past stems, active and passive participles, and verbal noun, in addition to an example verb for each class.

Notes:

- Italicized forms are those that follow automatically from the regular rules of vowel shortening and deletion.
- Multisyllabic forms without a stress mark have variable stress, depending on the nature of the suffix added, following the regular rules of stress assignment.
- Many participles and verbal nouns have acquired an extended sense. In fact, participles and verbal nouns are the major sources for lexical items based on verbs, especially derived (i.e. non-Form-I) verbs.
- Some verb classes do not have a regular verbal noun form; rather, the verbal noun varies from verb to verb. Even in verb classes that do have a regular verbal noun form, there are exceptions. In addition, some verbs share a verbal noun with a related verb from another class (in particular, many passive verbs use the corresponding active verb's verbal noun, which can be interpreted in either an active or passive sense). Some verbs appear to lack a verbal noun entirely. (In such a case, a paraphrase would be used involving a clause beginning with inn.)
- Outside of Form I, passive participles as such are usually non-existent; instead, the active participle of the corresponding passive verb class (e.g. Forms V, VI, VIIt/VIIn for Forms II, III, I respectively) is used. The exception is certain verbs in Forms VIII and X that contain a "classicized" passive participle that is formed in imitation of the corresponding participle in Classical Arabic, e.g. mistáʕmil "using", mustáʕmal "used".
- Not all forms have a separate verb class for hollow or doubled roots. When no such class is listed below, roots of that shape appear as strong verbs in the corresponding form, e.g. Form II strong verb ḍáyyaʕ/yiḍáyyaʕ "waste, lose" related to Form I hollow verb ḍá:ʕ/yiḍí:ʕ "be lost", both from root Ḍ-Y-ʕ.

Form	Root Type	Stem						Participle		Verbal Noun	Example
Form	Root Type		Past			Non-Past		Active	Passive	Verbal Noun	Example
Form	Root Type	Person of Suffix	1st/2nd	3rd		Non-Past		Active	Passive	Verbal Noun	Example
Form	Root Type	Suffix Type	Cons-Initial	None	Vowel-Initial	None	Vowel-Initial	Active	Passive	Verbal Noun	Example
Form	Root Type	Suffix Name	PA_{c}	PA_{0}	PA_{v}	NP_{0}	NP_{v}	Active	Passive	Verbal Noun	Example
I	Strong		FaMaL			FMaL		Fá:MiL	maFMú:L	(varies, e.g. FaML, FiML)	**fátaḥ/yíftaḥ** "open"
I	Strong		FaMaL			FMiL		Fá:MiL	maFMú:L	(varies, e.g. FaML, FiML)	**kátab/yíktib** "write"
I	Strong		FaMaL			FMuL		Fá:MiL	maFMú:L	(varies, e.g. FaML, FiML)	**dáxal/yúdxul** "enter"
I	Strong		FiMiL		FiML	FMaL		Fá:MiL	maFMú:L	(varies, e.g. FaML, FiML)	**fíhim/yífham** "understand"
I	Strong		FiMiL		FiML	FMiL		Fá:MiL	maFMú:L	(varies, e.g. FaML, FiML)	**mísik/yímsik** "hold, catch"
I	Strong		FiMiL		FiML	FMuL		Fá:MiL	maFMú:L	(varies, e.g. FaML, FiML)	**síkin/yúskun** "reside"
I	Defective		FaMé:	FáMa	FaM	FMa	FM	Fá:Mi	máFMi	(varies, e.g. FaMy, máFMa)	**báʔa/yíbʔa** "remain"
I	Defective		FaMé:	FáMa	FaM	FMi	FM	Fá:Mi	máFMi	(varies, e.g. FaMy, máFMa)	**ráma/yírmi** "throw"
I	Defective		FiMí:	FíMi	FíMy	FMa	FM	Fá:Mi	máFMi	(varies, e.g. FaMy, máFMa)	**nísi/yínsa** "forget"
I	Defective		FiMí:	FíMi	FíMy	FMi	FM	Fá:Mi	máFMi	(varies, e.g. FaMy, máFMa)	**míʃi/yímʃi** "walk"
I	Hollow		FíL	Fá:L		Fí:L		Fá:yiL	(mitFá:L, properly Form VIIt)	(varies, e.g. Fe:L, Fo:L)	**ga:b/yigí:b** "bring"
I	Hollow		FúL	Fá:L		Fú:L		Fá:yiL	(mitFá:L, properly Form VIIt)	(varies, e.g. Fe:L, Fo:L)	**ʃa:f/yiʃú:f** "see"
I	Hollow		FíL	Fá:L		Fá:L		Fá:yiL	(mitFá:L, properly Form VIIt)	(varies, e.g. Fe:L, Fo:L)	**na:m/yiná:m** "sleep"
I	Hollow		FúL	Fá:L		Fá:L		Fá:yiL	(mitFá:L, properly Form VIIt)	(varies, e.g. Fe:L, Fo:L)	**xa:f/yixá:f** "fear"
I	Doubled		FaMMé:	FáMM		FíMM		Fá:MiM	maFMú:M	(varies, e.g. FaMM, FuMM)	**ḥabb/yiḥíbb** "love"
I	Doubled		FaMMé:	FáMM		FúMM		Fá:MiM	maFMú:M	(varies, e.g. FaMM, FuMM)	**ḥaṭṭ/yiḥúṭṭ** "put"
II	Strong		FaMMaL					miFáMMaL		taFMí:L	**ɣáyyaṛ/yiɣáyyaṛ** "change"
II	Strong		FaMMiL					miFáMMiL		taFMí:L	**dárris/yidárris** "teach"
II	Defective		FaMMé:	FáMMa	FáMM	FáMMi	FáMM	miFáMMi		taFMíya	**wárra/yiwárri** "show"
III	Strong		FaMíL	Fá:MiL	FáML	Fá:MiL	FáML	miFá:MiL		miFáMLa	**zá:kir/yizá:kir** "study"
III	Defective		FaMé:	Fá:Ma	Fá:M	Fá:Mi	Fá:M	miFá:Mi		miFáMya	**ná:da/yiná:di** "call"
IV	Strong		ʔáFMaL			FMiL		míFMiL		iFMá:L	**ʔáḍṛab/yíḍrib** "go on strike"
IV	Defective		ʔaFMé:	ʔáFMa	ʔáFM	FMi	FM	míFMi		(uncommon)	**ʔáṛḍa/yíṛḍi** "please"
IV	Hollow		ʔaFáL	ʔaFá:L		Fí:L		miFí:L		ʔiFá:La	**ʔafá:d/yifí:d** "inform"
IV	Doubled		ʔaFaMMé:	ʔaFáMM		FíMM		miFíMM		iFMá:M	**ʔaṣárr/yiṣírr** "insist"
V	Strong		itFaMMaL			tFaMMaL		mitFáMMaL		taFáMMuL (or Form II)	**itmáṛṛan/yitmáṛṛan** "practice"
V	Strong		itFaMMiL			tFaMMiL		mitFáMMiL		taFáMMuL (or Form II)	**itkállim/yitkállim** "speak"
V	Defective		itFaMMé:	itFáMMa	itFáMM	tFáMMa	tFáMM	mitFáMMi		(use Form II)	**itʔáwwa/yitʔáwwa** "become strong"
VI	Strong		itFaMíL	itFá:MiL	itFáML	tFá:MiL	tFáML	mitFá:MiL		taFá:MuL (or Form III)	**itʕá:win/yitʕá:win** "cooperate"
VI	Defective		itFaMé:	itFá:Ma	itFá:M	tFá:Ma	tFá:M	mitFá:Mi		(use Form III)	**iddá:wa/yiddá:wa** "be treated, be cured"
VIIn	Strong		inFáMaL			nFíMiL	nFíML	minFíMiL		inFiMá:L (or Form I)	**inbásaṭ/yinbísiṭ** "enjoy oneself"
VIIn	Defective		inFaMé:	inFáMa	inFáM	nFíMi	nFíM	minFíMi		(use Form I)	**inḥáka/yinḥíki** "be told"
VIIn	Hollow		inFáL	inFá:L		nFá:L		minFá:L		inFiyá:L (or Form I)	**inbá:ʕ/yinbá:ʕ** "be sold"
VIIn	Doubled		inFaMMé:	inFáMM		nFáMM		minFáMM		inFiMá:M (or Form I)	**inbáll/yinbáll** "be wetted"
VIIt	Strong		itFáMaL			tFíMiL	tFíML	mitFíMiL		itFiMá:L (or Form I)	**itwágad/yitwígid** "be found"
VIIt	Defective		itFaMé:	itFáMa	itFáM	tFíMi	tFíM	mitFíMi		(use Form I)	**itnása/yitnísi** "be forgotten"
VIIt	Hollow		itFáL	itFá:L		tFá:L		mitFá:L		itFiyá:L (or Form I)	**itbá:ʕ/yitbá:ʕ** "be sold"
VIIt	Doubled		itFaMMé:	itFáMM		tFáMM		mitFáMM		itFiMá:M (or Form I)	**itʕádd/yitʕádd** "be counted"
VIII	Strong		iFtáMaL			FtíMiL	FtíML	miFtíMiL, muFtáMiL (classicized)	muFtáMaL (classicized)	iFtiMá:L (or Form I)	**istálam/yistílim** "receive"
VIII	Defective		iFtaMé:	iFtáMa	iFtáM	FtíMi	FtíM	miFtíMi, muFtáMi (classicized)		(use Form I)	**iʃtára/yiʃtíri** "buy"
VIII	Hollow		iFtáL	iFtá:L		Ftá:L		miFtá:L, muFtá:L (classicized)		iFtiyá:L (or Form I)	**ixtá:ṛ/yixtá:ṛ** "choose"
VIII	Doubled		iFtaMMé:	iFtáMM		FtáMM		miFtáMM, muFtáMM (classicized)		iFtiMá:M (or Form I)	**ihtámm/yihtámm** "be interested (in)"
IX	Strong		iFMaLLé:	iFMáLL		FMáLL		miFMíLL		iFMiLá:L	**iḥmáṛṛ/yiḥmáṛṛ** "be red, blush"
X	Strong		istáFMaL			stáFMaL		mistáFMaL, mustáFMaL (classicized)		istiFMá:L	**istáɣṛab/yistáɣṛab** "be surprised"
X	Strong		istáFMiL			stáFMiL		mistáFMiL, mustáFMiL (classicized)	mustáFMaL (classicized)	istiFMá:L	**istáʕmil/yistáʕmil** "use"
X	Defective		istaFMé:	istáFMa	istáFM	stáFMa	stáFM	mistáFMi, mustáFMi (classicized)		(uncommon)	**istákfa/yistákfa** "be enough"
X	Hollow		istaFáL	istaFá:L		staFí:L		mistaFí:L, mistaFí:L (classicized)		istiFá:L a	**istaʔá:l/yistaʔí:l** "resign"
X	Doubled		istaFaMMé:	istaFáMM		staFáMM		mistaFáMM, mustaFáMM (classicized)		istiFMá:M	**istaḥáʔʔ/yistaḥáʔʔ** "deserve"
X	Doubled		istaFaMMé:	istaFáMM		staFíMM		mistaFíMM, mustaFíMM (classicized)		istiFMá:M	**istamáṛṛ/yistamírr** "continue"
Iq	Strong		FaSTaL					miFáSTaL		FaSTáLa	**láxbaṭ/yiláxbaṭ** "confuse"
Iq	Strong		FaSTiL					miFáSTiL		FaSTáLa	**xárbiʃ/yixárbiʃ** "scratch"
IIq	Strong		itFaSTaL			tFaSTaL		mitFáSTaL		itFaSTáLa	**itláxbaṭ/yitláxbaṭ** "be confused"
IIq	Strong		itFaSTiL			tFaSTiL		mitFáSTiL		itFaSTáLa	**itʃáʕlil/yitʃáʕlil** "flare up"

=== Negation ===
One characteristic feature of Egyptian syntax is the two-part negative verbal circumfix /ma-...-ʃ(i)/, which it shares with other North African dialect areas as well as some southern Levantine dialect areas, probably as a result of the influence of Egyptian Arabic on these areas:

- Past: /ˈkatab/ "he wrote" /ma-katab-ʃ(i)/ "he didn't write" ما كتبشِ
- Present: /ˈbijik-tib/ "he writes" /ma-bjik-tib-ʃ(i)/ "he doesn't write" ما بيكتبشِ

/ma-/ probably comes from the Arabic negator /maː/. This negating circumfix is similar in function to the French circumfix ne ... pas. It should also be noted that Coptic and Ancient Egyptian both had negative circumfix.

The structure can end in a consonant /ʃ/ or in a vowel /i/, varying according to the individual or region. Nowadays speakers use /ʃ/. However, /ʃi/ was sometimes used stylistically, specially in the past, as attested in old films.

The negative circumfix often surrounds the entire verbal composite including direct and indirect object pronouns:

- /ma-katab-hum-ˈliː-ʃ/ "he didn't write them to me"

However, verbs in the future tense can instead use the prefix /miʃ/:

- /miʃ-ħa-ˈjiktib/ (or /ma-ħa-jikˈtibʃ/ "he won't write"

Interrogative sentences can be formed by adding the negation clitic "(miʃ)" before the verb:

- Past: /ˈkatab/ "he wrote"; /miʃ-ˈkatab/ "didn't he write?"
- Present: /ˈjiktib/ "he writes"; /miʃ-bi-ˈjiktib/ "doesn't he write?"
- Future: /ħa-ˈjiktib/ "he will write"; /miʃ-ħa-ˈjiktib/ "won't he write?"

Addition of the circumfix can cause complex changes to the verbal cluster, due to the application of the rules of vowel syncope, shortening, lengthening, insertion and elision described above:

- The addition of /ma-/ may trigger elision or syncope:
  - A vowel following /ma-/ is elided: (ixtáːr) "he chose" → (maxtárʃ).
  - A short vowel /i/ or /u/ in the first syllable may be deleted by syncope: (kíbir) "he grew" → (makbírʃ).
- The addition of /-ʃ/ may result in vowel shortening or epenthesis:
  - A final long vowel preceding a single consonant shortens: (ixtáːr) "he chose" → (maxtárʃ).
  - An unstressed epenthetic /i/ is inserted when the verbal complex ends in two consonants: /kunt/ "I was" → (makúntiʃ).
- In addition, the addition of /-ʃ/ triggers a stress shift, which may in turn result in vowel shortening or lengthening:
  - The stress shifts to the syllable preceding /ʃ/: (kátab) "he wrote" → (makatábʃ).
  - A long vowel in the previously stressed syllable shortens: (ʃáːfit) "she saw" → (maʃafítʃ); (ʃá:fu) "they saw" or "he saw it" → (maʃafú:ʃ).
  - A final short vowel directly preceding /ʃ/ lengthens: (ʃáːfu) "they saw" or "he saw it" → (maʃafú:ʃ).

In addition, certain other morphological changes occur:

- (ʃafúː) "they saw him" → (maʃafuhúːʃ) (to avoid a clash with (maʃafúːʃ) "they didn't see/he didn't see him").
- (ʃáːfik) "He saw you (fem. sg.)" → (maʃafkíːʃ).
- (ʃúftik) "I saw you (fem. sg.)" → (maʃuftikíːʃ).

== Syntax ==
In contrast with Classical Arabic, but much like the other varieties of Arabic, Egyptian Arabic prefers subject–verb–object (SVO) word order; CA and to a lesser extent MSA prefer verb–subject–object (VSO). For example, in MSA "Adel read the book" would be قرأَ عادل الكتاب Qaraʾa ʿĀdilu l-kitāb IPA: [ˈqɑɾɑʔɑ ˈʕæːdel ol keˈtæːb] whereas EA would say عادل قرا الكتاب ʕādil ʔara l-kitāb IPA: [ˈʕæːdel ˈʔɑɾɑ lkeˈtæːb].

Also in common with other Arabic varieties is the loss of unique agreement in the dual form: while the dual remains productive to some degree in nouns, dual nouns are analyzed as plural for the purpose of agreement with verbs, demonstratives, and adjectives. Thus "These two Syrian professors are walking to the university" in MSA (in an SVO sentence for ease of comparison) would be "هذان الأستاذان السوريان يمشيان إلى الجامعة" Haḏān al-ʾustāḏān as-Sūriyyān yamšiyān ʾilā l-ǧāmiʿah IPA: [hæːˈzæːn æl ʔostæːˈzæːn as suːrejˈjæːn jæmʃeˈjæːn ˈʔelæ lɡæːˈmeʕæ], which becomes in EA "الأستاذين السوريين دول بيمشو للجامعة" il-ʔustazēn il-Suriyyīn dōl biyimʃu lil-gamʕa, IPA: [el ʔostæˈzeːn el soɾejˈjiːn ˈdoːl beˈjemʃo lelˈɡæmʕæ].

Unlike most other forms of Arabic, however, Egyptian prefers final placement of question words in interrogative sentences. This is a feature characteristic of the Coptic substratum of Egyptian Arabic.

== Coptic substratum ==
Some authors have argued for the influence of a substratum of the Coptic language which was the native language of the vast majority of Nile Valley Egyptians prior to the Muslim invasion on Egyptian Arabic, specifically on its phonology, syntax, and lexicon. Coptic is the latest stage of the indigenous Egyptian language spoken until the mid-17th century when it was finally completely supplanted among Egyptian Muslims and a majority of Copts by the Egyptian Arabic.

=== Phonology ===
Since Coptic lacked interdental consonants it could possibly have influenced the manifestation of their occurrences in Classical Arabic /θ/ /ð/ /ðˤ/ as their dental counterparts /t/ /d/ and the emphatic dental /dˤ/ respectively. (see consonants)

Behnstedt argues that the phenomenon of merging of interdentals with plosives has also occurred in areas without a substratum lacking interdentals, e.g. in Mecca, Aden and Bahrain, and can be caused by drift rather than the influence of a substratum concluding that "[o]n the phonological level, there is no evidence for Coptic substratal influence."

=== Syntax ===
A syntactic feature of to Egyptian Arabic arguably inherited from Coptic is the remaining of interrogative words (i.e. "who", "when", "why") in their "logical" positions in a sentence rather than being preposed, or moved to the front of the sentence, as (mostly) in Classical Arabic or English.

Examples:

- راح مصر امتى؟ /rˤaːħ masˤr ʔimta/ "When (/ʔimta/) did he go to Egypt?" (lit. "He went to Egypt when?")
- راح مصر ليه؟ /rˤaːħ masˤr leːh/ "Why (/leːh/) did he go to Egypt? (lit. "He went to Egypt why?")
- مين [اللى] راح مصر؟ /miːn rˤaːħ masˤr/ or /miːn illi rˤaːħ masˤr/ "Who (/miːn/) went to Egypt/Cairo? (literally – same order)

The same sentences in Literary Arabic (with all the question words (wh-words) in the beginning of the sentence) would be:

- متى ذهب إلى مصر؟ /mataː ðahaba ʔilaː misˤr/
- لِمَ ذهب إلى مصر؟ /lima ðahaba ʔilaː misˤr/
- من ذهب إلى مصر؟ /man ðahaba ʔilaː misˤr/

Diem argues that in Cairene Arabic also the preposition of interrogative words occurs and in Classical Arabic and other Arabic dialects also their postposition and thus the effect of a Coptic substratum might be – if any – the preference for one of the two possibilities.

=== Lexicon ===
Behnstedt estimates the existence of ca. 250 to 300 Coptic loanwords in Egyptian Arabic.

== Orthography and romanization ==
=== Orthography ===
There is no fixed orthography for Egyptian Arabic. Where it is written in Arabic script the orthography varies between spellings closer to those of Standard Arabic and spellings closer to the phonology of Egyptian Arabic. This variability arises from the deficiency of the Arabic script for writing the colloquial Egyptian Arabic, for which it is not designed. Part of this is the unavailability of signs for some sounds of Egyptian Arabic that are not part of Standard Arabic. Both options are used in parallel, often even in by one author or in one work. The two options appears for example for these cases:

- treatment of originally long vowels that become short or deleted as a result of vowel shortening or vowel deletion, e.g. the feminine active participle of عرف, ʿirif, 'to know', that is pronounced [ˈʕæɾfæ], can be written in two ways:
  - etymological spelling with the shortly pronounced originally long vowel "ا": عارفة,
  - phonetic spelling without the "ا": عرفة;
- words written with the letters "ث", "ذ", and "ظ" in Standard Arabic that are pronounced /t/, /z/, and /dˁ/ in Egyptian Arabic can keep their etymological Standard Arabic spelling or be phonetically respelled with "ت", "د" and "ض".

=== Romanization ===
In the table below romanizations by different authors starting with Spitta's from 1880 are given as examples of the variety of those used. Where authors use custom glyphs the ones given try the best available approximation. The use of transcribing glyphs among different authors and between those and a representation of Egyptian Arabic in Arabic script (in doubt Hinds & Badawi 1986 is used below) can not be exactly aligned because different authors use different analyses of the studied language. Here also the table below tries to give a good approximation.

Arabic letter	Romanization							IPA
Arabic letter	Spitta	Mitchell	Harrell	Abdel-Massih	Hinds/ Badawi	Woidich	Franco	IPA
Consonants
ب	b	b	b	b	b	b	b	/b/
ب/پ			p				p	/p/
ت	t	t	t	t	t	t	t	/t/
ث (respelled to ت for /t/)		t/s			t/θ		t/s	/t/, /s/
ج	g	g	g	g	g	g	g	/ɡ/
ج/چ		j	ž	ž	j	ž	j	/ʒ/
ح	ḥ	ꞕ	ħ	ɦ	ꞕ	ḥ	7/h (h)	/ħ/
خ	ḫ	x	x	x	x	x	kh/7'/5 (kh)	/x/
د	d	d	d	d	d	d	d	/d/
ذ (respelled to د for /d/)					d/z		d/z	/d/, /z/
ر	r	r	r	r/ṛ	r	r	r	/r/~/ɾ/
ز	z	z	z	z	z	z	z	/z/
س	s	s	s	s	s	s	s	/s/
ش	ś	ʃ	ʃ	š	ʃ	š	sh/ch	/ʃ/
ص	ṣ	ʂ		ṣ	ʂ	ṣ	s	/sˁ/
ض	ḍ	ɖ		ḍ	ɖ/ẓ	ḍ	d	/dˁ/
ط	ṭ	ʈ		ṭ	ʈ	ṭ	t	/tˁ/
ظ (respelled to ض for /dˁ/)		ʐ		ẓ	d/ᶎ	ẓ	z	/dˁ/, /zˁ/
ع	ʿ	ƹ	ع	ʕ	ƹ	ʿ	3 (not written or a/e)	/ʕ/
غ	ġ	ɣ	ǥ	ɣ	ɣ	ġ	gh/3' (gh)	/ɣ/
ف	f	f	f	f	f	f	f	/f/
ف/ڤ				v	v	v	v	/v/
ق	q (ʾ)	q	ʔ	ʔ	ɢ		2/k	/ʔ/
ق	q	q	q	q	q	q	k	/q/
ك	k	k	k	k	k	k	k	/k/
ل	l	l	l	l/ḷ	l	l	l	/l/
م	m	m	m	m	m	m	m	/m/
ن	n	n	n	n	n	n	n	/n/
ه	h	h	h	h	h	h	h	/h/
و	w	w	w	w	w	w	w/ou	/w/
ي	j	y	y	y	y	y	y/i	/j/
ء	ʾ	ʕ	ʔ	ʔ	ʕ	ʾ	2 (not written or a/e)	/ʔ/
Long vowels
ا	ɑ̂/(ɑ̊)	aa	a:	aa	aa	ā	a	/a(ː)/: [æ(ː)]
ا	ɑ̈	aa	a:	aa	ɑɑ	ā	a	/a(ː)/: [ɑ(ː)]
و	û	uu	u:	uu	uu	ū	ou/oo/o	/u(ː)/
و		oo	o:	oo	oo	ō	o	/o(ː)/
ي	y	ii	i:	ii	ii	ī	i/ee	/i(ː)/
ي		ee	e:	ee	ee	ē	e/ei/ai	/e(ː)/
Short vowels
ـَ/ا	ɑ/ɑ̈/(e/ɑ̊)	a	a	a	a/ɑ	a	a	/a/ [æ] and [ɑ]
ـُ/و	o/u	o/u	u/(o)	o/u	o/u	o/u	o/ou	/u/ [o]~[ʊ]~[u]
ـِ/ي	i/(e/ü)	i/e	i/(e)	e/i	e/i	e/i	e/i	/i/ [e]~[ɪ] and [i]
epenthetic (anaptyctic vowel)	e̊/å/i̊/ů	ĭ/ă/ŭ	a/e/i/o/u		ⁱ/ᵃ/...	i/i̊/u/ů	not written/e	[e]~[ɪ]

== Sociolinguistic features ==
Egyptian Arabic is used in most social situations, with Modern Standard and Classical Arabic generally being used only in writing and in highly religious and/or formal situations. However, within Egyptian Arabic, there is a wide range of variation. El-Said Badawi identifies three distinct levels of Egyptian Arabic-based chiefly on the quantity of non-Arabic lexical items in the vocabulary: ʿĀmmiyyat al-Musaqqafīn (Cultured Colloquial or Formal Spoken Arabic), ʿĀmmiyyat al-Mutanawwirīn (Enlightened or Literate Colloquial), and ʿĀmmiyyat al-'Ummiyīn (Illiterate Colloquial). Cultured Colloquial/Formal Spoken Arabic is characteristic of the educated classes and is the language of discussion of high-level subjects, but it is still Egyptian Arabic; it is characterized by use of technical terms imported from foreign languages and MSA and closer attention to the pronunciation of certain letters (particularly qāf). It is relatively standardized and, being closer to the standard, it is understood fairly well across the Arab world. On the opposite end of the spectrum, Illiterate Colloquial, common to rural areas and to working-class neighborhoods in the cities, has an almost-exclusively Arabic vocabulary; the few loanwords generally are very old borrowings (e.g. جمبرى gambari, [ɡæmˈbæɾi] "shrimp", from Italian gamberi, "shrimp" (pl.)) or refer to technological items that find no or poor equivalents in Arabic (e.g. تلفزيون tel(e)vezyōn/tel(e)fezyōn [tel(e)vezˈjoːn, tel(e)fezˈjoːn], television). Enlightened Colloquial (ʿĀmmiyyat al-Mutanawwirīn) is the language of those who have had some schooling and are relatively affluent; loanwords tend to refer to items of popular culture, consumer products, and fashions. It is also understood widely in the Arab world, as it is the lingua franca of Egyptian cinema and television.

In contrast to MSA and most other varieties of Arabic, Egyptian Arabic has a form of the T-V distinction. In the singular, انت enta/enti is acceptable in most situations, but to address clear social superiors (e.g. older persons, superiors at work, certain government officials), the form حضرتك ḥaḍretak/ḥaḍretek, meaning "Your Grace" is preferred (compare Spanish usted).

This use of ḥaḍretak/ḥaḍretek is linked to the system of honorifics in daily Egyptian speech. The honorific taken by a given person is determined by their relationship to the speaker and their occupation.

Examples of Egyptian honorifics
Honorific	IPA	Origin/meaning	Usage and notes
سِيَادْتَك/سِيَادْتِك siyadtak/siyadtik	[seˈjættæk]	Standard Arabic siyādatuka, "Your Lordship"	Persons with a far higher social standing than the speaker, particularly at work. Also applied to high government officials, including the President. Equivalent in practical terms to "Your Excellency" or "The Most Honourable".
سَعَادْتَك saʿādtak	[sæˈʕættæk]	Standard Arabic saʿādatuka, "Your Happiness"	Government officials and others with significantly higher social standing. Equivalent in governmental contexts "Your Excellency", or "Your Honor" when addressing a judge.
مَعَالِيك maʿālīk	[mæʕæˈliːk]	Standard Arabic maʿālīka, "Your Highness"	(Obsolete.) Government ministers. Equivalent in practical terms to "Your Excellency" or "The Right Honourable".
حَجّ/حَجَّة ḥagg/ḥagg	[ˈħæɡ(ɡ)]/[ˈħæɡɡæ]	Standard Arabic ḥāǧ, "pilgrim"	Traditionally, any Muslim who has made the Hajj, or any Christian who has made a pilgrimage to Jerusalem. Currently also used as a general term of respect for all elderly people.
بَاشَا bāsha	[ˈbæːʃæ]	Ottoman Turkish pasha	Informal address to a male of similar social status. Roughly equivalent to "man" in informal English speech. (e.g. "Thanks man")
بيه/بك bēh	[beː]	Ottoman Turkish bey	Informal address to a male of equal or lesser social status. Essentially equivalent to but less current than bāsha. Somewhat archaic.
أَفَنْدِي afandi	[æˈfændi]	Ottoman Turkish efendi	Archaic address to a well-born male of a less social standard than bēh and bāsha; more commonly used jocularly to social equals or to younger male members of the same family.
هَانِم hānim	[ˈhæːnem]	Ottoman Turkish hanım/khanum, "Lady"	Address to a woman of high social standing, or esteemed as such by the speaker. Somewhat archaic, only used now for referring to an elder woman, or humorously for a little girl.
سِتّ sitt	[ˈset(t)]	Standard Arabic sayyida(t) "mistress"	The usual word for "woman". When used as a term of address, it conveys a modicum of respect.
مَدَام madām	[mæˈdæːm]	French madame	Respectful term of address for an older or married woman.
آنِسَة ānisa	[ʔæˈnesæ]	Standard Arabic ānisah, "young lady"	Semi-formal address to an unmarried young woman.
أُسْتَاذ ustāz	[ʔosˈtæːz]	Standard Arabic ustādh, "professor", "gentleman"	Besides actual university professors and schoolteachers, used for experts in certain fields. May also be used as a generic informal respectul reference, as bēh or bāsha.
أُوسْطَى/أُسْطَى usṭa	[ˈostˤɑ]/[ˈɑstˤɑ]	Turkish usta, "master"	Drivers and also skilled laborers. Largely archaic.
يِسْطَا ysta	ˈ[jastɑ]	From Turkish usta, via Arabic usṭā	Very colloquial and extremely informal lower-class term used to address mechanics, drivers, or any random male on the street. Commonly used by younger Egyptians, even high-class.
رَئِيس raʾīs	[ˈɾɑjjes]	Standard Arabic raʿīs, "chief"	Skilled laborers, and lower-class bosses. The term also means "president", although this meaning predates its use, having been traditionally used to refer to the chief of a village.
بَاش مُهَنْدِس bashmuhandis	[bæʃmoˈhændes]	Ottoman Turkish baş mühendis, "chief engineer"	Originally meant for engineers and certain types of highly skilled laborers (e.g. electricians and plumbers), now used to refer to most middle-class men, regardless of profession.
مِعَلِّم miʿallim	[meˈʕællem]	Standard Arabic muʿallim, "teacher"	Most working class men, particularly semi-skilled and unskilled laborers.
عَمّ ʿamm	[ˈʕæm(m)]	Standard Arabic ʿamm, "paternal uncle"	Older male servants or social subordinates with whom the speaker has a close relationship. It can also be used as a familiar term of address, much like basha. The use of the word in its original meaning is also current, for third-person reference. The second-person term of address to a paternal uncle is ʿammo [ˈʕæmmo]; onkel [ˈʔonkel], from French oncle, may also be used, particularly for uncles unrelated by blood (including spouses of aunts, uncles-in-law, and "honorary" uncles).
دَادَة dāda	[ˈdæːdæ]	Turkish dadı, "nanny"	Older female servants or social subordinates with whom the speaker has a close relationship.
أَبِيه abēh	[ʔæˈbeː]	Ottoman Turkish abi/ağabey, "elder brother"	Male relatives older than the speaker by about 10–15 years. Upper-class, and mostly archaic.
أَبْلَة abla	[ˈʔɑblɑ]	Ottoman Turkish abla, "elder sister"	Mostly archaic, female relatives older than the speaker by about 10–15 years. Sometimes used for female bosses as well (though in lower class settings, e.g. a nightclub)

Other honorifics also exist.

In usage, honorifics are used in the second and third person.

== Study ==
Egyptian Arabic has been a subject of study by scholars and laypersons in the past and the present for many reasons, including personal interest, egyptomania, business, news reporting, and diplomatic and political interactions. Egyptian Colloquial Arabic (ECA) is now a field of study in both graduate and undergraduate levels in many higher education institutions and universities in the world. When added to academic instruction, Arabic-language schools and university programs provide Egyptian Arabic courses in a classroom fashion, and others facilitate classes for online study.

== Sample text ==
Article 1 of the Universal Declaration of Human Rights

Egyptian/Masri (Arabic script; spelling not standardised):

الاعلان العالمى لحقوق الانسان, البند الاولانى
البنى ادمين كلهم مولودين حرّين ومتساويين فى الكرامة والحقوق. اتوهبلهم العقل والضمير، والمفروض يعاملو بعضيهم بروح الاخوية.

Franco/Arabic Chat Alphabet (has no strict standard):

elbani 2admeen kolohom mawloodeen 7oreen w metsaween f elkarama w elh2oo2. etwahablohom el3a2l w eldameer, w elmafrood ye3amlo ba3dehom bro7 el2a5aweya.

English:

Article 1 of the Universal Declaration of Human Rights
All human beings (who) are born (are) free and equal (like each other) in (their) dignity and rights. They are endowed with reason (brain), and conscience, and (they) should act towards one another in the spirit of brotherhood.

== Sample words and sentences ==
- إزيك [ezˈzæjjæk] ("How are you [m.]")
- إزيك [ezˈzæjjek] ("How are you [f.]")
- إزيكو [ezzæjˈjoko] ("How are you [pl.]")
- ايه ده [ˈʔeː ˈdæ] ("What is all this?", "What is the point", "What is this?" – expression of annoyance)
  - Ex.: انت بتقوللهم عليا كده ليه, ايه ده؟ [ˈentæ betʔolˈlohom ʕæˈlæjjæ ˈkedæ ˈleː ˈʔeː dæ] ("Why are you telling them such things about me, what is all this?")
- خلاص [xɑˈlɑːsˤ]: several meanings, though its main meaning is "enough", often adverbial
  - "Stop it!" Ex.: زهقت, خلاص [zeˈheʔte xɑˈlɑːsˤ] ("I'm annoyed, stop it!")
  - "It is over!", "finally, eventually" مامتى كانت عيانه و ماتت, خلاص Ex.: [ˈmɑmti kæːnet ʕajˈjæːnæ wˈmæːtet xɑˈlɑːsˤ]| ("My mother was ill and died finally." [or "...and it is over now"])
  - "Ok, then!" Ex.: خلاص, أشوفك بكرا [xɑˈlɑːsˤ ʔæˈʃuːfæk ˈbokɾɑ] ("I'll see you tomorrow then")
- خالص [ˈxɑːlesˤ] ("at all")
  - ماعندناش حاجه نقولها خالص [mæʕændeˈnæːʃ ˈħæːɡæ nˈʔolhæ ˈxɑːlesˤ] ("We have nothing at all to say")
- كفاية [keˈfæːjæ] ("It is enough!" or "That is enough")
- يعنى [ˈjæʕni] ("that is to say" or "meaning" or "y'know")
  - As answer to انت عامل إيه؟ [entæ ˈʕæːmel ˈ(ʔ)eː] ("How do you do [m.]?") (as an answer: مش أد كده [meʃ ˈʔædde ˈkedæ] "I am so so" or نص نص [ˈnosˤse ˈnosˤ] lit. '"half half"' = مش تمام [meʃ tæˈmæːm] "not perfect")
  - يعنى ايه؟ [jæʕni ˈʔeː] ("What does that mean?")
  - امتى هتخلص يعنى؟ [ˈemtæ hɑtˈxɑllɑsˤ ˈjæʕni] ("When are you finishing exactly, then?)
- بقى [ˈbæʔæ] (particle of enforcement → "just" in imperative clauses and "well,...then?" in questions)
  - هاته بقى [ˈhæːto ˈbæʔæ] ("Just give it to me!)" عمل ايه بقى؟ [ˈʕæmæl ˈ(ʔ)eː ˈbæʔæ] or [ˈʕæmæl ˈ(ʔ)eː ˈbæʔæ] ("Well, what did he do then?")

== See also ==
- Levantine Arabic – one of the two prestige varieties of spoken Arabic, alongside Egyptian
- Bayoumi Andil – Egyptian linguist who stated that Egyptian is a language
- Egyptian Arabic Wikipedia
- Egyptian language – extinct language family spoken in ancient Egypt
  - Coptic language – latest stage of the Egyptian language
- Futuh or early Muslim military expansions

== Citations ==
=== Bibliography ===
- Abdel-Massih, Ernest T.; Bahig, A. Fathy (1978). A Comprehensive Study of Egyptian Arabic, Vol. 1: Conversations, Cultural Texts, Sociolinguistic Notes (2nd ed.). Ann Arbor: Center for Near Eastern and North African Studies. ISBN 978-0-932098-11-5. OCLC 777140122. OL 11480326M.
- Abu Elhija, Dua'a (23 January 2014). "A New Writing System? Developing Orthographies for Writing Arabic Dialects in Electronic Media". Writing Systems Research. 6 (2): 190–214. doi:10.1080/17586801.2013.868334. ISSN 1758-6801.
- Behnstedt, Peter; Woidich, Manfred (1985). Die ägyptisch-arabischen Dialekte. Vol. I & II. Wiesbaden, Germany: L. Reichert. ISBN 978-3-88226-227-8. OCLC 13049795.
- Behnstedt, Peter; Woidich, Manfred (2018). "Chapter 3: The Formation of the Egyptian Arabic Dialect Area". In Holes, Clive (ed.). Arabic Historical Dialectology: Linguistic and Sociolinguistic Approaches. pp. 64–95. doi:10.1093/OSO/9780198701378.003.0003. ISBN 978-0-19-870137-8. OCLC 1005879722.
- Behnstedt, Peter (2005). "Coptic Loanwords". In Edzard, Lutz; de Jong, Rudolf Erik (eds.). Encyclopedia of Arabic Language and Linguistics. Vol. 1. Leiden, Netherlands: Brill. pp. 501–505. doi:10.1163/1570-6699_EALL_EALL_COM_0071. ISSN 1570-6699. OCLC 374171816.
- Bishai, Wilson B. (July 1962). "Coptic Grammatical Influence on Egyptian Arabic". Journal of the American Oriental Society. 82 (3): 285–289. doi:10.2307/597639. ISSN 0003-0279. JSTOR 597639.
- Bjørnsson, Jan Arild (November 2010). Egyptian Romanized Arabic: A Study of Selected Features from Communication Among Egyptian Youth on Facebook (PDF) (Master of Arts). University of Oslo. OCLC 747047111.
- Borg, Gert (2007). "How to Be Kool in Arabic Writing: Linguistic Observations from the Side Line". In Motzki, Harald; Ditters, Everhard (eds.). Approaches to Arabic Linguistics: Presented to Kees Versteegh on the Occasion of His Sixtieth Birthday. Studies in Semitic Languages and Linguistics Vol. 49. Amsterdam: Brill Academic Publishers. pp. 525–542. doi:10.1163/EJ.9789004160156.I-762.144. ISBN 978-90-04-16015-6. OCLC 940891095.
- Davies, Humphrey T. (2005). "Dialect Literature". In Edzard, Lutz; de Jong, Rudolf Erik (eds.). Encyclopedia of Arabic Language and Linguistics. Vol. 1. Leiden, Netherlands: Brill. pp. 597–604. doi:10.1163/1570-6699_eall_EALL_COM_0086. ISSN 1570-6699. OCLC 374171816.
- Diem, Werner (1974). Hochsprache und Dialekt im Arabischen: Untersuchungen zur heutigen arabischen Zweisprachigkeit. Abhandlungen fuer die Kunde des Morgenlandes (in German). Wiesbaden, Germany: Franz Steiner Verlag. ISBN 978-3-515-01834-0. OCLC 185628300. OL 5150940M.
- Diem, Werner (1979). "Studien zur Frage des Substrats im Arabischen". Der Islam (in German). 56 (1): 12–80. doi:10.1515/ISLM.1979.56.1.12. ISSN 1613-0928.
- Gadalla, Hassan A. H. (2000). Comparative Morphology of Standard and Egyptian Arabic. ISBN 978-3-89586-972-3. LCCN 00401300. OL 6870655M.
- Gary, Judith Olmsted; Gamal-Eldin, Saad M. (1982). Cairene Egyptian Colloquial Arabic. Lingua Descriptive Studies 6. Amsterdam: North-Holland Pub. Co. ISBN 978-0-7099-3815-6. OCLC 8297762.
- Haeri, Niloofar (2003). Sacred Language, Ordinary People: Dilemmas of Culture and Politics in Egypt. New York: Palgrave Macmillan. ISBN 0-312-23897-5. OCLC 50124768.
- Harrell, Richard S. (1957). The Phonology of Colloquial Egyptian Arabic. Publications Series B-Aids, no. 9. New York: American Council of Learned Societies. OCLC 4299226.
- Hinds, Martin; Badawi, El-Said (1986). A Dictionary of Egyptian Arabic. Beirut: Librairie du Liban Publishers. ISBN 978-1-85341-003-1. OCLC 928122887. OL 15378288M.
- Mitchell, T. F. (1956). An Introduction to Egyptian Colloquial Arabic. Oxford: Oxford University Press. OCLC 466065001.
- Mitchell, T. F. (1962). Colloquial Arabic: The Living Language of Egypt. London: The English Universities Press. OCLC 896332745.
- Mitchell, T. F. (1978). An Introduction to Egyptian Colloquial Arabic. Oxford: Clarendon Press. ISBN 0-19-815149-7. OCLC 1158940549. OL 18702205M.
- Nishio, Tetsuo (1995). "Word Order and Word Order Change of Wh-Questions in Egyptian Arabic: The Coptic Substratum Reconsidered". In Cremona, Joe; Holes, Clive; Khan, Geoffrey (eds.). Proceedings of the 2nd International Conference of l'Association Internationale pour la Dialectologie Arabe (AIDA), Held at Trinity Hall in the University of Cambridge, 10–14 September 1995. Cambridge: University Publications Centre. pp. 171–179. OCLC 469259739.
- Prasse, Karl-G.; Blanford, Katrine; Moestrup, Elisabeth A.; El-Shoubary, Iman (2000). 5 Egyptian-Arabic One Act Plays: A First Reader (Bilingual ed.). Copenhagen: Museum Tusculanum Press. ISBN 87-7289-612-4. OCLC 754875354. "Plays in Arabic[. ]Includes preface in Arabic and English, and 'Reading rules' in English"—OCLC.
- Spitta, Wilhelm (1880). Grammatik des arabischen Vulgärdialectes von Ägypten (in German). Leipzig: J.C. Hinrichs. OCLC 14714297. OL 23438029M. (PQ112070596).
- Tomiche, Nada (1964). Le parler arabe du Caire. Recherches méditerranéennes Textes et études linguistiques, 3 (in French and Arabic). Paris, The Hague: Mouton & Co. OCLC 12631611.
- Versteegh, Kees (2001) [2001]. The Arabic Language. Edinburgh: Edinburgh University Press. ISBN 0-7486-1436-2. OCLC 45767561.
- Watson, Janet C. E. (2002). The Phonology and Morphology of Arabic. New York: Oxford University Press. ISBN 978-0-19-925759-1. OCLC 49518955. OL 9656479M.
- Woidich, Manfred (2006). Das Kairenisch-Arabische: Eine Grammatik. Porta linguarum Orientalium, neue Serie, 22 (in German). Wiesbaden, Germany: Harrassowitz Verlag. ISBN 978-3-447-05315-0. OCLC 70268095. OL 19689820M.
- Woidich, Manfred (2010). "Von der wörtlichen Rede zur Sachprosa: Zur Entwicklung der Ägyptisch-Arabischen Dialektliteratur" (PDF). Dialektliteratur heute – regional und international. Forschungskolloquium am Interdisziplinären Zentrum für Dialektforschung an der Friedrich-Alexander-Universität Erlangen-Nürnberg, 19.11.2009–20.11.2009 (in German).
- Youssef, Ahmad Abdel-Hamid (2003). From Pharaoh's Lips: Ancient Egyptian Language in the Arabic of Today. Cairo: The American University in Cairo Press. ISBN 977-424-708-6. OCLC 912578933.
- Zack, Elisabeth (2001). "The Use of Colloquial Arabic in Prose Literature: 'Laban ilʿaṣfūr' by Yūsuf al-Qaʿīd". Quaderni di Studi Arabi. 19: 193–219. ISSN 1121-2306. JSTOR 25802939.
