= Ghada Abdel Aal =

Egyptian writer

- غادة محمد عبد الرازق
- Born: December 21, 1978 (age 47); El Mahalla El Kubra, Egypt
- Occupations: Author, screenwriter, columnist, pharmacist
- Writing career
- Language: Arabic (Egyptian Arabic)
- Years active: 2006–present
- Notable work: Wanna Be a Bride (عايزة أتجوز)
- Notable awards: Bauer Prize (2012); Golden Pyramid Prize (Cairo Arabic Media Festival)

Ghada Abdel Aal (Arabic: غادة محمد عبد الرازق born 1978 in El Mahalla El Kubra, Egypt) is an Egyptian author and screenwriter, best known for her satirical blog and book Wanna be a bride (Egyptian Arabic: عايزة أتجوز; [ˈʕæjzæ (ʔæ)tˈɡæwːez]). She is a winner of the 2012 Bauer Prize at the Venice International Literary Festival, and the Golden Pyramid award at the Cairo Arabic Media Festival.

== Life and career ==
Ghada Abdel Aal was born on 21 December 1978 in El Mahalla El Kubra, Egypt. Her mother was a public relations worker, while her father was an engineer. She studied pharmacy at college.

Abdel Aal started on a career as a pharmacist at a hospital pharmacy in her hometown. In 2006, encountering a variety of marriage proposals, she began a blog Wanna be a bride/I Wanna Get Married, satirising the experiences of Egyptian women whom society expects only to marry and have children. As the blog became popular, she was approached by a publishing house, Dar El Shorouk, to convert her writings to a book. The eponymous book, written in a colloquial Arabic, was published in 2008 and became a bestseller in the Arab world. The book was translated to English by Nora Eltahawy in 2010. There are also German, Italian and Dutch translations. Abdel Aal wrote the screenplay adaptation of the book, which won the Golden Pyramid Prize at the Cairo Arabic Media Festival. Her book was also awarded the 2012 Bauer Prize at the Venice International Literary Festival.

An alumna of the International Writing Program's Fall Residency (2010), she wrote a screenplay for a political comedy The Night They Arrested Egypt. In 2014, a 30-episode television satire series Embratoreyet Meen? (Whose Empire?) written by her began showing in Egypt. She writes a humorous column for the newspaper Al-Shorouk.
