= Safa Abdel Al Moneim =

Egyptian writer, novelist, educator and a researcher in folk literature

Safa Abdel Moneim
- Born: 27 December 1960 (age 65); Cairo, Egypt
- Education: Ain Shams University (BA)
- Occupations: Writer, novelist, storyteller, researcher
- Years active: 1983– present

Safa Abdel Moneim (Arabic: صفاء عبد المنعم, romanized: Ṣafāʾ ʿAbd al-Munʿim; born 27 December 1960) is an Egyptian writer, novelist, educator and a researcher in folk literature. She is born in 1960. She has published nine short story collections and twelve novels. Among her most prominent works are Within the Spirit's Beauty (Egyptian Arabic: من حلاوة الروح, romanized: Min Ḥalāwit il-Rōḥ), a novel written in colloquial Egyptian Arabic which has been translated to English and Italian, and the short-story collection At Night When He Left (Arabic: في الليل لما خلى, romanized: Fī al-Layl Lammā Khallá). She also has several studies published in various newspapers and magazines. Her most recent published novel is My Granny Apple.

== Biography ==
Safa Abdel Moneim Mahmoud Zayed was born on 27 December 1960 in Cairo. She graduated in 1986 from Al Helmeya High School after which she earned a B.A. in education from Ain-Shams University.

Safa Abdel Moneim's literary career began by reading her short stories in a youth centre in Shubra Al Kheima until publishing her very first short story in the Qalyoubia newspapers. she was awarded in a national short story competition for youth centres in 1983. Her first short story collection 'Hikayat Al'lail' was published in 1984, in which five stories were published in a joint-collection and discussed in several seminars in cultural and youth centers. She lists Anton Chekhov's story 'The Death of a Government Clerk' and Yusuf Idris' 'A Glance' as her most significant literary influencers. Safa Adel Moneim started her cultural when she and her late husband, poet and writer, Magdi Al-Gabri held weekly symposiums to discuss and criticize works of literature and poetry. These symposiums lasted from 1990 until her in 1998. Safa Abdel Moniem has been working as a school principal since 2009. She documented her career as a school principal in her novel 'Journals of a School Principal' Abdel Moneim holds several memberships in various cultural, literary and educational institutions and unions, as she is a member of the Writers Union of Egypt and Cairo Atelier. She is also a lecturer at the General Authority for Cultural Palaces, a member of the Egyptian Society for folk Literature and the International Pen Club.

== Works ==
=== Novels ===
Sources:

- "Granny Apple" (Arabic: ستي تفاحة, romanized: Si'tty Tufaha), 2020
- "Journals of A School Principal" (Arabic: يوميات مديرة مدرسة, romanized: Yawmiyat Mudairat Madrasa), 2020
- "A Peacock Above The Tree" (Arabic: فوق الشجرة طاووس, romanized: Fawq Al Shajarah Tawoo's), 2020
- "The Edge of Soul" (original title: Hafat Al Roul), 2019
- "Merit Filter" (original title: Merit Asfar), 2009
- "A Female Artist's Home" (Arabic: بيت فنانة, romanized: Bait Fannana), 2009
- "He Called Her "Innana" (Arabic: قال لها، يا إنانا, romanized: Qala Laha Ya Innana), 2008
- "Whom She Saw" (original title: Al'leti Ra'at), 2008
- "Like a Witch" (Arabic: مثل ساحرة, romanized: Mithla Sahira), 2008
- "The Wind of Simoom" (original title: Rih Al Sumoom), 2003
- "Within the Spirit's Beauty" (Egyptian Arabic: من حلاوة الروح, romanized: Min Ḥalāwit il-Rōḥ), 2001

=== Short-story collections ===
- "Sure, It's Really Fine" (Arabic: عادي جدا طبعا, romanized: Aadi Geddan Taba'an), 2020
- "The Lady of the Place" (original title: Siyadat Al Makan), 2013
- "At Night When He Left" (Arabic: في الليل لما خلى, romanized: Fī al-Layl Lammā Khallá), 2009
- "Fantasy of a Female" (Arabic: أنثى الخيال, romanized: Ontha Al Khayal), 2010
- "In a Way or Another" (Arabic: Bi Shakl Aw Bi Akher), 2009
- "Girls and Girls" (Arabic: بنات في بنات, romanized: Banat Fi Banat), 2000
- "Friendly Little Things" (Arabic: أشياء صغيرة وأليفة, romanized: Ashiaa' Saghira Wa Alifa), 1996
- "That Cairo Tempts Me with Its Bare legs" (original title: Tilk Al Qahira Tughrini Bi'Siqaniha Al'Aria), 1991
- "Tales of The Night" (original title: Hikayat Al'lail), 1984

=== Encyclopaedias ===
- "Children Songs Encyclopaedia", 2008
- "Describing Egypt Now Encyclopaedia", 2008 (contributing)
