= Abrahamson =

Abrahamson is a surname. Notable people with the surname include:

- Dinah Abrahamson (1954–2013), American author and politician
- Donald Abrahamson (born 1957), American weightlifter
- Emmy Abrahamson (born 1976), Swedish actress and author
- Eric Abrahamson, American politician
- Eufrosyne Abrahamson (1836–1869), Swedish soprano
- Jakob Abrahamson, Swedish poet
- James A. Abrahamson (born 1933), American Air Force general
- Jared Abrahamson, Canadian actor
- Jennie Abrahamson (born 1977), Swedish pop singer and songwriter
- Joan Abrahamson, American attorney, artist, and activist
- Kjell Albin Abrahamson (1945–2016), Swedish journalist
- Kirsten Abrahamson (born 1960), Canadian ceramic artist
- Laurel Abrahamson (born 1986), American volleyball player
- Lenny Abrahamson (born 1966), Irish film and television director
- Max Abrahamson (1932–2018), Irish lawyer
- Richard Abrahamson (born 1947), American handball player
- Shirley Abrahamson (1933–2020), American state supreme court chief justice for Wisconsin, United States
- Theodore Abrahamson (1900–1978), Norwegian-American dairy farmer, businessman and politician
- Una Stella Abrahamson (1922–1999), English-born Canadian artist and writer
- Warren Abrahamson, American biologist
