= Mark Henry =

American professional wrestler, weightlifter and radio personality (born 1971)

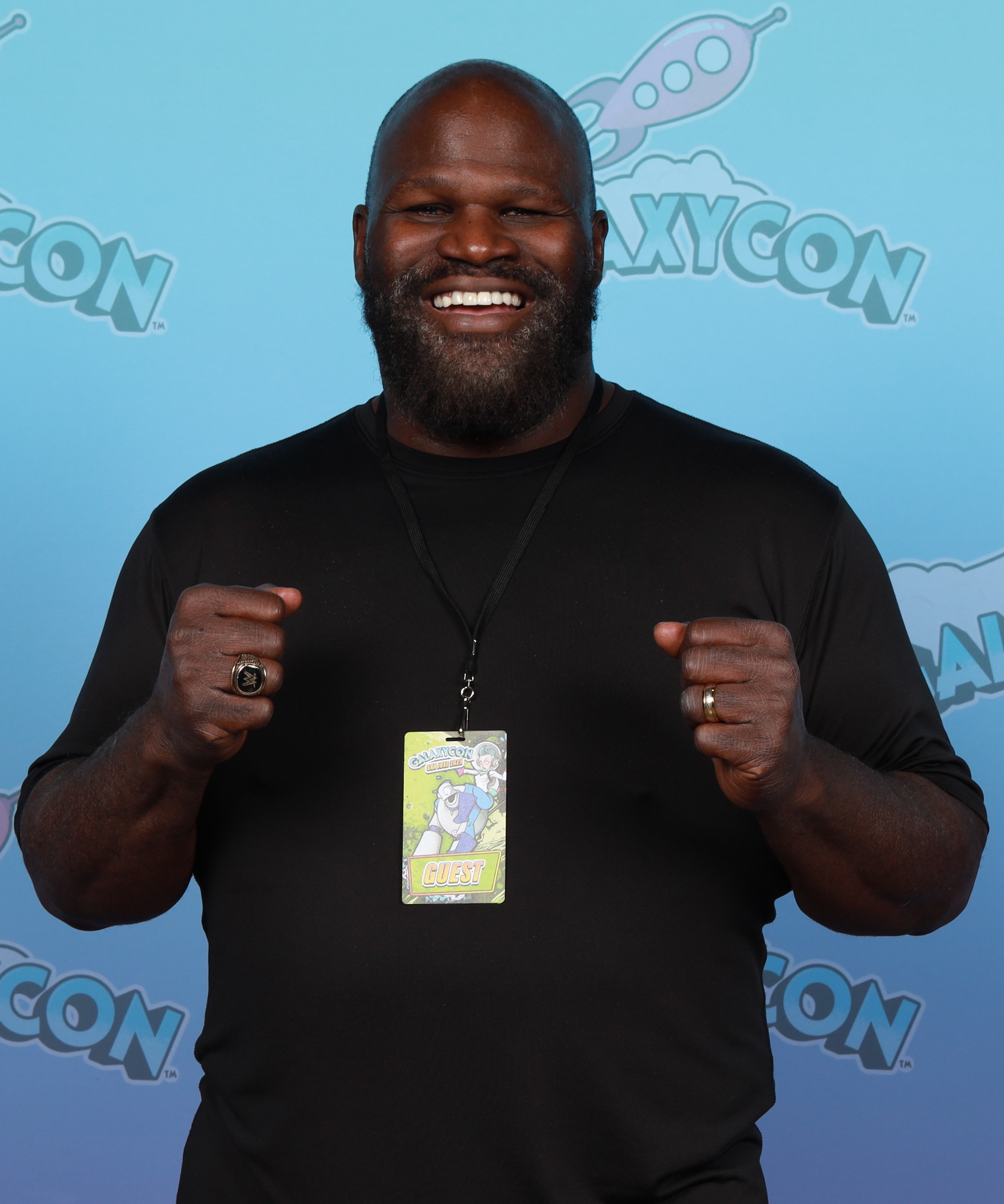
- Henry in 2025

Personal information
- Born: Mark Jerrold Henry; June 12, 1971 (age 55) Silsbee, Texas, U.S.
- Children: 2
- Family: Kevin Henry (cousin)

Professional wrestling career
- Ring name(s): Mark Henry; Markswoggle
- Billed height: 6 ft 4 in (193 cm)
- Billed weight: 360 lb (163 kg)
- Billed from: Silsbee, Texas
- Trained by: Leo Burke; Tom Prichard
- Debut: September 21, 1996
- Retired: April 27, 2018

Medals and competitions

Men's Weightlifting

Representing United States

Pan American Games
Silver medal – second place	Mar del Plata 1995	+108kg
Gold medal – first place	Mar del Plata 1995	+108kg
Bronze medal – third place	Mar del Plata 1995	+108kg

Strongman

Representing United States

Arnold Strongman Classic
1st	2002 Arnold Strongman Classic

Powerlifting

Representing United States

WDFPF World Powerlifting Championships
1st	1995	+145kg

USAPL National Powerlifting Championships
1st	1995	+145kg
1st	1997	+145kg

USPF National Powerlifting Championships
2nd	1990	+125kg

International Junior Powerlifting Championships
1st	1991	+125kg

Weightlifting

Representing United States

NACAC Championships
1st	1996	+108kg

U.S. National Weightlifting Championships
4th	1991	+110kg
3rd	1992	+110kg
1st	1993	+108kg
1st	1994	+108kg
1st	1996	+108kg

USA Weightlifting American Open Championships
2nd	1991	+110kg
1st	1992	+110kg

U.S. Olympic Festival Championships
1st	1993	+108kg
1st	1994	+108kg

U.S. National Junior Weightlifting Championships
1st	1991	+110kg

Mark Jerrold Henry (born June 12, 1971) is an American former powerlifter, Olympic weightlifter, strongman, and retired professional wrestler currently signed to WWE under a Legends contract.

Henry is a two-time Olympian (1992 and 1996) and a gold, silver, and bronze medalist at the Pan American Games in 1995. As a powerlifter, he was WDFPF World Champion (1995) and a two-time U.S. National Champion (1995 and 1997) and once held an American record in the deadlift. He still holds the WDFPF world records in the squat, deadlift and total.

In weightlifting, Henry was a three-time U.S. National Weightlifting Champion (1993, 1994, 1996), an American Open winner (1992), a two-time U.S. Olympic Festival Champion (1993 and 1994) and a NACAC champion (1996). He held all three Senior US American weightlifting records in 1993–1997. In strongman, Henry won the inaugural Arnold Strongman Classic in 2002.

After joining the World Wrestling Federation (WWF, now WWE) in 1996, he became a one-time WWF European Champion and a two-time world champion, having held the ECW Championship in 2008, and WWE's World Heavyweight Championship in 2011. First winning the ECW Championship, he became only the fourth black world champion in WWE history (after The Rock, Booker T, and Bobby Lashley). In April 2018, Henry was inducted into the WWE Hall of Fame Class of 2018.

== Early life ==
Henry was born in the small town of Silsbee in East Texas, 90 miles northeast of Houston. As a child, he was a big wrestling fan and André the Giant was his favorite wrestler. While attending a wrestling show in Beaumont, Texas, young Henry tried to touch André as he was walking down the aisle, but tripped over the barricade. André picked him up out of the crowd and put him back behind the barricade. When Henry was 12 years old, his father, Ernest, died of complications from diabetes. When he was 14 years old, Henry was diagnosed with dyslexia.

Henry comes from a family in which almost all of the men are larger than average, especially his great uncle Chudd, who was 6 ft 7 in, weighed approximately 500 lb (230 kg), never had a pair of manufactured shoes, and was known as the strongest man in the Piney Woods of East Texas.

Henry played football in high school until his senior year, when he strained ligaments in his wrist during the first game of the year and scored below 700 on the SAT.

== Powerlifting career ==
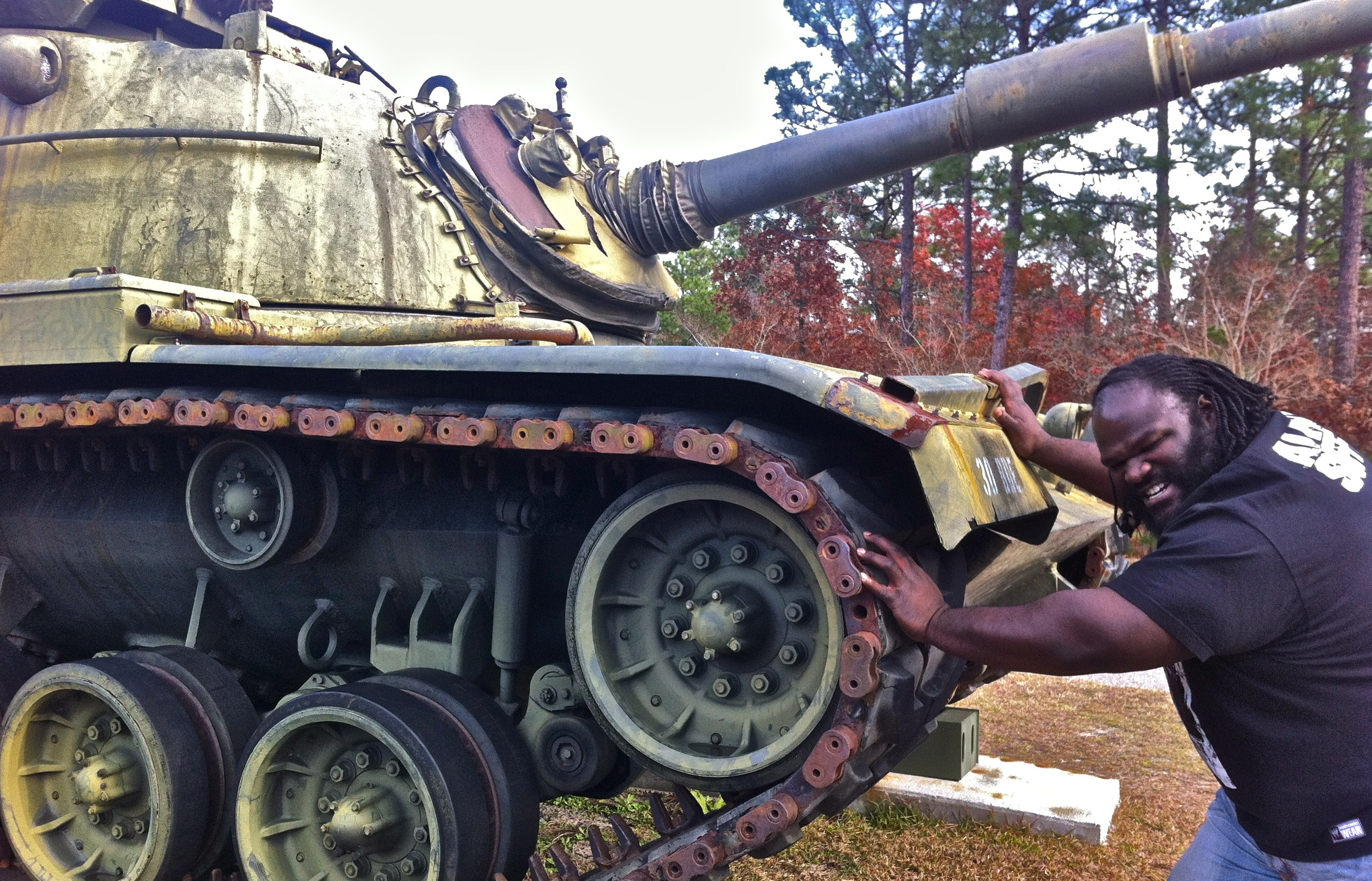
Henry appears to push a tank

By the time Mark Henry was in the fourth grade, he was 5 ft 5 in (1.65 m) and weighed 225 lb (102 kg). His mother bought a set of weights for him when he was ten years old. During Henry's freshman year at Silsbee High School, he was already able to squat 600 lb (270 kg), which was well over the school record. As an 18-year-old high school senior, Henry was called "the world's strongest teenager" by the Los Angeles Times, and made it into the headlines in early 1990 for winning the National High School Powerlifting Championships and setting teenage lifting world records in the squat 832 lb (377 kg) and total 2,033 lb (922 kg). By the time Henry finished high school, he was a three-time Texas state champion with state and national records in all four powerlifting categories—the squat at 832 lb (377 kg), bench press at 525 lb (238 kg) and deadlift at 815 lb (370 kg) as well as the total at 2,033 lb (922 kg).

At the Texas High School Powerlifting Championships in April 1990, Terry Todd, a professor of kinesiology at the University of Texas at Austin and former weightlifter, spotted Henry and persuaded him to go to Austin after he graduated to train in the Olympic style of weightlifting. In July 1990 at the USPF Senior National Powerlifting Championships, 19-year-old Henry came second only to the legendary six-time World Powerlifting Champion Kirk Karwoski. While powerlifting relies primarily on brute strength and power, which Henry obviously possessed, Olympic weightlifting is considered more sophisticated, involving more agility, timing, flexibility and technique. There have been few lifters in history who have been able to be successful in both lifting disciplines. Mastering the technique of weightlifting usually takes many years of practice, but Henry broke four national junior records in weightlifting after only eight months of training. In April 1991, he won the United States National Junior Championships; 20 days later he placed fourth at the U.S. Senior National Championships, and finished sixth at the Junior World Weightlifting Championships in Germany two months later. Only a few weeks afterwards, he became 1991's International Junior Champion in Powerlifiting as well. In Henry's first year in competitive weightlifting, he broke all three junior (20 and under) American records 12 times, and became the United States' top Superheavyweight, surpassing Mario Martinez.

At the age of 19, Henry had already managed to qualify for the weightlifting competition at the 1992 Summer Olympics, where he finished tenth in the Super- Heavyweight class. Ten months before the 1992 Olympics, Henry had begun training with Dragomir Cioroslan, a bronze medalist at the 1984 Summer Olympics, who said that he had "never seen anyone with Mark's raw talent". After the Olympics, Henry became more determined to focus on weightlifting and began competing all over the world. In late 1992 he took the win at the USA Weightlifting American Open and further proved his dominance on American soil by winning not only the U.S. National Weightlifting Championships, but also the U.S. Olympic Festival Championships in 1993 and 1994. At the 1995 Pan American Games Henry won a gold, silver and bronze medal.

Henry won the ADFPA U.S. National Powerlifting Championships in 1995 with a 2,314.8 lb (1,050.0 kg) raw Powerlifting Total. Despite competing without supportive equipment in contrast to the other competitors, Henry managed to outclass the lifter in second place by 286 lb (130 kg), defeating not only five-time IPF World Powerlifting Champion and 12 time USAPL National Powerlifting Champion Brad Gillingham, but also America's Strongest Man of 1997 Mark Philippi. In the process he set all-time world records in the raw deadlift at 903.9 lb (410.0 kg) and the squat without a squat suit at 948.0 lb (430.0 kg) as well as the all-time drug tested raw total at 2,314.8 lb (1,050.0 kg). Later that same year in October, he competed in the drug-free Powerlifting World Championships and won again, even though he trained on the powerlifts only sparingly—due his main focus still being on the two Olympic lifts. He not only became World Champion by winning the competition but also bettered his previous all-time squat world record to 953.5 lb (432.5 kg) and his all-time drug tested world record total to 2,336.9 lb (1,060.0 kg).

In 1996 Henry became the North America, Central America, Caribbean Islands (NACAC) Champion. He earned the right to compete at the Olympics by winning the U.S. National Weightlifting Championships in the Spring of 1996 for a third time. During his victory Henry became Senior US American record holder (1993–1997) in the Snatch at 396.83 lb (180.00 kg), Clean and jerk at 485 lb (220 kg), and Total at 881.8 lb (400.0 kg), improving all of his three previous personal bests. No one in the history of the sports had ever lifted as much as him in the five competitive lifts—the snatch and the clean and jerk in weightlifting—the squat, bench press and deadlift in powerlifting.

In the months prior to the 1996 Summer Olympics in Atlanta, Georgia, Henry received more attention and publicity than any lifter in recent United States history. He guested at Jay Leno, Conan O'Brien and The Oprah Winfrey Show and was featured on HBO Inside Sports and The Today Show. He was also featured in dozens of magazines including U.S. News & World Report, People Vanity Fair, ESPN The Magazine and Life where he was photographed nude by famed artist Annie Lebowitz. During this period he connected with WWE owner Vince McMahon for the first time, which led to him signing a 10-year deal as professional wrestler.

Henry improved his lifts to 407 lb (185 kg) in the snatch and 507 lb (230 kg) in the clean-and-jerk during his final eight weeks of preparation for the 1996 Summer Olympics in Atlanta. Henry at 6-foot-4-inches tall and 414 lb (188 kg) bodyweight, became the largest athlete in Olympic history and was voted captain of the Olympic weightlifting team. He suffered a back injury during the competition and was unable to approach his normal performance level. Due to the injury he had to drop out after his first clean and jerk attempt and finished with a disappointing 14th place. His appearance at the Olympics proved to be his last official competition in Olympic weightlifting, as he retired from weightlifting, vowing never to return unless the sport is "cleaned up" of anabolic steroid use.

Since his career start as a professional wrestler shortly after the Olympics, he broke his leg in the fall of 1996. But by the summer of the following year he had rehabilitated enough to be able to compete at the USAPL National Powerlifting Championships 1997, where he won the competition to become the U.S. National Powerlifting Champion in the Super Heavyweight class again. He had planned to continue heavy training in powerlifting, although his travel schedule as a professional wrestler with the WWF (now WWE) made sustained training difficult. Mark's WWF contract was unique in many ways, allowing him at least three months off each year from wrestling, so he could train for the national and world championships in weightlifting or powerlifting. Barring injury, Mark had originally hoped to return to the platform in late 1998, to lift for many more years, and to eventually squat at least 1,100 lb (500 kg) without a "squat suit" and to deadlift 1,000 lb (450 kg).

Although in early 1998 he was still able to do five repetitions in the bench press with 495 lb (225 kg), three repetitions in the squat with 855 lb (388 kg) (with no suit and no knee wraps), and three repetitions in the standing press with 405 lb (184 kg) in training, while traveling with the World Wrestling Federation, he never returned to compete again in official championships in favor of his wrestling career. He weighed 380 lb (170 kg) at that time, and his right upper arm was measured at 24" by Terry Todd.: When asked in September 2003, who the strongest man in the world was, Bill Kazmaier, considered by many to be the greatest strongman of all time, stated: "It would have to be Mark Henry. [...] I think he's one of the strongest men in the history of the world, without a doubt."

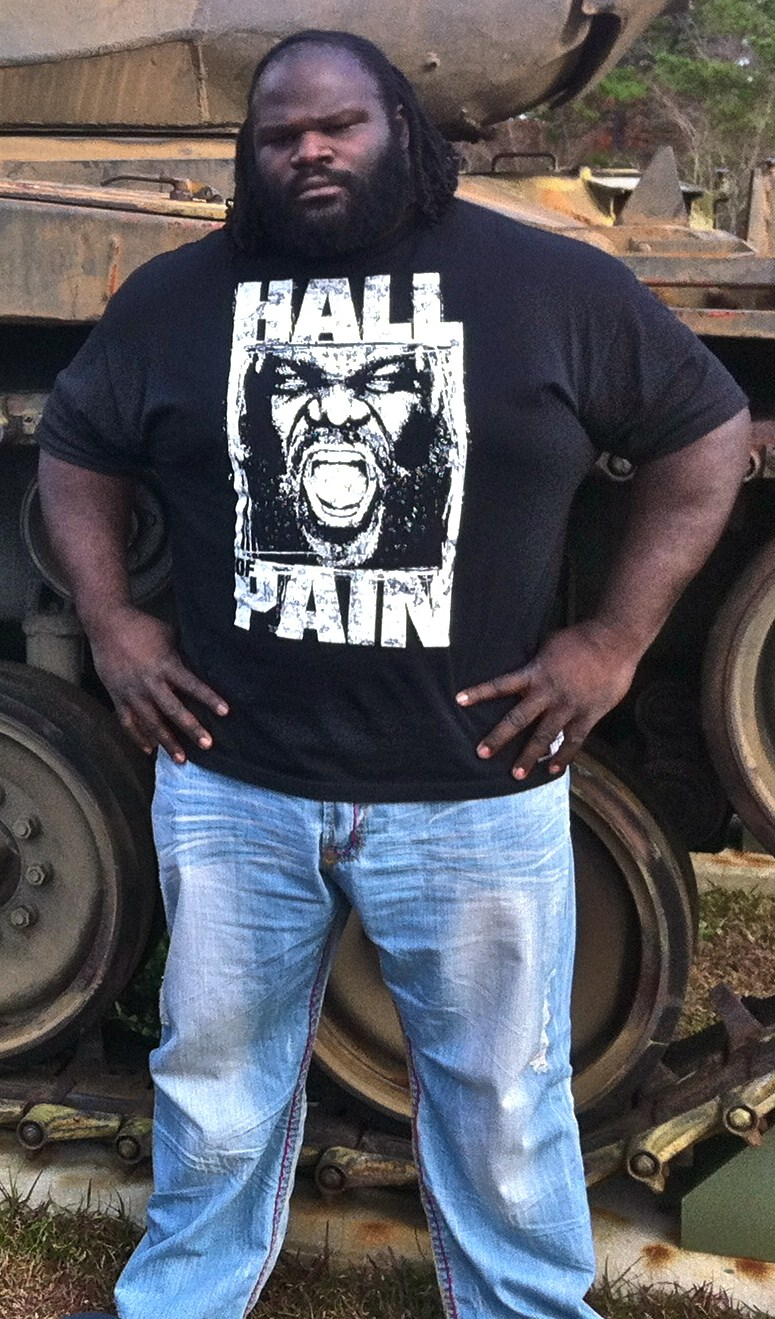
Mark Henry in December 2011

== Personal records ==
=== Official Records ===
Powerlifting: Done in official Powerlifting meets

- Squat – 953.5 lb (432.5 kg) raw with knee wraps (done on October 29, 1995 WDFPF)

→ current WDFPF world record squat in SHW class (+regardless of weight class and equipment) since 1995
→ former all-time unequipped squat world record for over a decade in SHW class until 2010 (+regardless of weight class until 2007)

- Bench Press – 518.1 lb (235.0 kg)
- Deadlift – 903.9 lb (410.0 kg) raw (done on July 16, 1995, ADFPA (USAPL))

→ former all-time raw world record deadlift in SHW class until 2010 (+regardless of weight class until 2009)

- Powerlifting Total – 2,336.9 lb (1,060.0 kg) (953.5 + 518.1 + 865.3 lb (432.5 + 235.0 + 392.5 kg) raw with wraps (done on October 29, 1995 WDFPF)

Weightlifting: done in official competition

- Snatch: 396.8 lb (180.0 kg) (done at 1996's U.S. Nationals)

→ Senior US American snatch record 1993–1997 in SHW class (+regardless of weight class)

- Clean and jerk: 485.0 lb (220.0 kg) (done at 1996's U.S. Nationals)

→ Senior US American clean&jerk record 1993–1997 in SHW class

- Weightlifting Total: 881.8 lb (400.0 kg) – snatch: 396.8 lb (180.0 kg) / clean&jerk: 485.0 lb (220.0 kg) (done at 1996's U.S. Nationals)

→ Senior US American weightlifting total record 1993–1997 in SHW class (+regardless of weight class)

Strongman: done in official competition and during exhibitions

- Apollon's wheels: 366 lb (166 kg) x 3 reps (2002 Arnold Strongman Classic) (former world record)

→ Henry is either the fourth or the fifth verified man to clean and press the legendary implement after Louis 'Apollon' Uni himself in the 1890s (which is disputed), Charles Rigoulot in 1930, John Davis in 1949 and Norbert Schemansky in 1954. Unlike any of the predecessors, he cleaned it using double overhand grip and push pressed it without involving a jerk.
Despite this performance was eclipsed by Žydrūnas Savickas in 2003, and bettered each year by one more rep, all his cleans were continental cleans. It was not surpassed until 2006, when Vasyl Virastyuk and Mikhail Koklyaev performed 5 reps using the exact clean Henry used.

- Deadlift: 884 lb (401 kg) x 2 reps oil filled plates (2002 Arnold Strongman Classic)
- Hummer push: 7,154 lb (3,245 kg) for 12 meters (2002 Arnold Strongman Classic)
- Timber carry: 816 lb (370 kg) for 11 meters on an inclined ramp (2002 Arnold Strongman Classic)
- Inch dumbbell: 172 lb (78 kg) (2002 Association of Oldetime Barbell & Strongmen, Dinner event) (joint world record)

→ Henry is the first man in history to clean the legendary dumbbell. He also proceeded to push press it.

Combined official records:

- Combined official Supertotal (official weightlifting total + official powerlifting total):

881.8 lb (400.0 kg) + 2,336.9 lb (1,060.0 kg) = 3,218.7 lb (1,460.0 kg)

- Career aggregate Supertotal (Individual 5 lift PR weightlifting & powerlifting total):

396.8 lb (180.0 kg) + 485.0 lb (220.0 kg) + 953.5 lb (432.5 kg) + 518.1 lb (235.0 kg) + 903.9 lb (410.0 kg) = 3,257.3 lb (1,477.5 kg)

=== Unofficial Records ===
Olympic Weightlifting According to Dr. Terry Todd:

- Snatch: 407 lb (185 kg)
- Clean and jerk: 507 lb (230 kg)

Powerlifting: According to Henry himself:

- Squat: 1,006 lb (456 kg) raw with wraps (According to Henry himself. Dr. Terry Todd reported Henry was capable of a 1,000 pounds (450 kg) squat in summer 1996.)
- Bench press: 601 lb (273 kg) raw
- Deadlift: 924 lb (419 kg) raw In training, prior to his 903.9 pounds (410.0 kg) raw deadlift in competition, 1995.

In a two-week period in spring 1998, Henry squatted 855 lb (388 kg) raw without knee wraps for 3 reps, bench pressed 495 lb (225 kg) for 5 reps, and overhead pressed 405 lb (184 kg) for 3 reps, all while travelling with the WWF.

Combined unofficial records:

- Career aggregate Supertotal (Individual 5 lift PR weightlifting & powerlifting total):

407 lb (185 kg) + 507 lb (230 kg) + 1,006 lb (456 kg) + 601 lb (273 kg) + 924 lb (419 kg) = 3,445 lb (1,563 kg)

== Professional wrestling career ==
=== World Wrestling Federation / World Wrestling Entertainment / WWE (1996–2021) ===
==== Early career (1996–1997) ====
At the age of 24, Henry made his first appearance on World Wrestling Federation (WWF) programming on the March 11, 1996 episode of Monday Night Raw, where he press slammed Jerry Lawler, who was ridiculing Henry while interviewing him in the ring. After Henry competed in the 1996 Summer Olympics, the WWF signed him to a ten-year contract. Trained by professional wrestler Leo Burke, his first feud in the WWF was with Lawler. At the pay-per-view event, SummerSlam on August 18, Henry came to the aid of Jake Roberts who was suffering indignity at the hands of Lawler. Henry's debut wrestling match was against Lawler in a house show at the Baltimore Arena on September 21. Henry defeated Lawler in a rematch at In Your House 10: Mind Games on September 22. The feud continued at house shows during subsequent weeks. On the November 4 episode of Raw, Henry served as a cornerman for Barry Windham in a match against Goldust. He was set to team with Windham, Marc Mero and Rocky Maivia to take on the team of Lawler, Goldust, Hunter Hearst Helmsley and Crush at Survivor Series on November 17, but was replaced by Jake Roberts when he was forced to withdraw from the event due to injury. On the November 17 episode of WWF Superstars of Wrestling, Henry defeated Hunter Hearst Helmsley, Crush, and Goldust in a tug of war contest. Henry also worked on several shows for United States Wrestling Association. Henry's career was then stalled as he took time off over the next year to heal injuries and engage in further training.

In November 1997, he returned to the ring, making his televised return the following month. By the end of the year, he was a regular fixture on WWF programming, defeating the Brooklyn Brawler on the December 15 episode of Raw, and beating The Sultan on the December 27 episode of WWF Shotgun Saturday Night.

==== Nation of Domination (1998) ====
Henry joined the Nation of Domination faction with Faarooq, The Rock, Kama Mustafa, and D'Lo Brown on January 12, 1998. After The Rock usurped Faarooq's position as leader, Henry switched loyalties to The Rock. He also competed at WrestleMania XIV on March 29 in a tag team Battle Royal with Brown as his partner, but they did not win. After short feuds against Ken Shamrock and Vader, Henry participated in his faction's enmity against D-Generation X (DX), which included a romantic storyline with DX member Chyna.

==== Sexual Chocolate (1998–2000) ====
When The Nation disbanded, he engaged in a short feud with The Rock, defeating him at Judgment Day: In Your House on October 18 with help from Brown, and then forming a permanent team with Brown, gaining Ivory as a manager.

During the next year, Henry gave himself the nickname "Sexual Chocolate", adopting a ladies' man character. He first resumed his storyline with former enemy Chyna, but it ended with her betraying him in a controversial angle including a transvestite. At SummerSlam on August 22, 1999, during a match between Brown and Jeff Jarrett for the WWF Intercontinental and WWF European Championships (both held at the time by Brown), Henry turned on Brown and helped Jarrett win the match and the titles. The next night, Henry was awarded the European title by Jarrett in return for his help. Henry lost the title one month later to Brown at the Unforgiven pay-per-view on September 26.

The night after he tried to make up with Brown and later in the week claimed to be a sex addict resulting in him attending a sex therapy session a week later where he claimed that he lost his virginity at eight years old to his sister, and had just slept with her two days ago. He was part of a storyline about him overcoming sex addiction, which he accomplished thanks to The Godfather.

After this twist, Henry turned into a fan favorite, and was seen on television romancing WWF veteran wrestler Mae Young as part of the "Sexual Chocolate" character. He feuded with Viscera during this time, as part of a storyline where Viscera splashed Mae Young while she was carrying Henry's child. Young later gave birth to a hand.

==== Ohio Valley Wrestling and strongman competitions (2000–2002) ====
In 2000, Henry was sent to Ohio Valley Wrestling (OVW) to improve his conditioning and wrestling skills. Later that year, Henry's mother died, causing him to go on hiatus from wrestling. He felt he had to compete in the "Super Bowl of weight lifting"—the Arnold Strongman Classic—in honor of his mother, who gave him his first weight set when he was a child.

Four months prior to the contest, Henry began lifting the heaviest of weights and trained for the first time since 1997 for a major lifting competition. In the coming contest he was to face the #1 ranked strongman in the world, and defending World's Strongest Man competition winner of 2001 Svend Karlsen, World's Strongest Man winner of 2006 Phil Pfister, World Powerlifting Champion of 2001 and equipped deadlift world record holder Andy Bolton, World Muscle Power Champion, Olympic weightlifting Champion Raimonds Bergmanis, and reigning America's Strongest Man of 2001 Brian Schoonveld.

On February 22, 2002, in Columbus, Ohio the competition, consisting of four events, designed to determine the lifter with the greatest overall body power, began. Henry surprised everybody when he won the first event, setting a world record in the process by lifting the Apollon's Axle three times overhead. Only three men in history had ever been able to press it at all. By deadlifting 885 lb (401 kg) for two repetitions in the second event and easily pushing a 5,000 lb (2,300 kg) or more Hummer with nearly flat tires in the third event, Henry kept his lead continuously throughout the competition and never gave it up again. In the final "Farmer's Walk"-event Henry quickly carried the roughly 850 lb (390 kg) of railroad ties up an incline, winning the whole competition convincingly to capture the winning prize—a US$75,000 Hummer, a vacation cruise and $10,000 cash.

Since Henry had only trained for four months, his win was a shock for strongman experts, but remained basically unnoticed by the wrestling audience.

==== World's Strongest Man (2002–2007) ====
Henry returned to the WWF in April 2002 and was sent to the SmackDown! brand, where he developed an in-ring persona of performing "tests of strength" while other wrestlers took bets on the tests, but the gimmick met with little success. After being used sporadically on WWE (formerly WWF) television during 2002, as Henry was training for a weightlifting contest, and suffering a knee injury, he was sent back to OVW for more training.

In August 2003, Henry returned to WWE television on the Raw roster as a heel where he found some success as a member of "Thuggin' And Buggin' Enterprises", a group of African Americans led by Theodore Long who worked a race angle in which they felt they were victims of racism and were being held down by the "white man". During that time, Henry was involved in a brief program with World Heavyweight Champion Goldberg when the former champion, Triple H, put a bounty on Goldberg. This was followed by a brief rivalry with Shawn Michaels, before Henry engaged in a rivalry with Booker T. After defeating Booker T twice, once in a street fight and once in a six-man tag team match, Henry lost to Booker T at Armageddon on December 14. At a practice session in OVW in February 2004, Henry tore his quadriceps muscle, and was out for over a year after undergoing surgery. Henry was then utilized by WWE as a public relations figure during his recovery, before returning to OVW to finish out 2005.

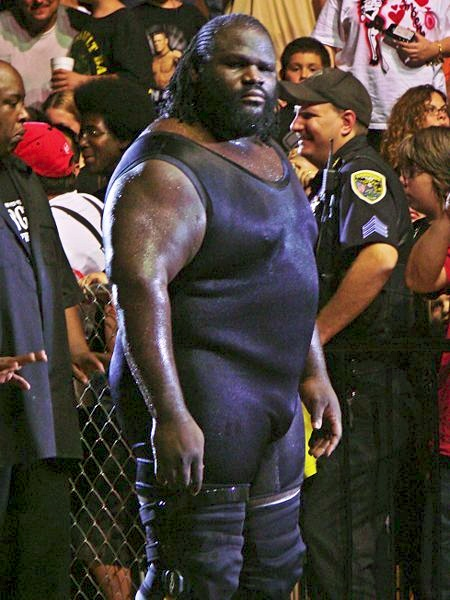
Henry in 2007

During the December 30, 2005 episode of SmackDown!, Henry made his return to television, as he interfered in a WWE Tag Team Championship match, joining with MNM (Joey Mercury, Johnny Nitro, and Melina), to help them defeat Rey Mysterio and Batista for the championship. While Henry feuded with the World Heavyweight Champion Batista, he suffered a severely torn triceps that required surgery during a live event, forcing him to vacate his title. Henry wrestled for the vacant title on the January 13 episode of SmackDown! in a Battle Royal and wrestled Kurt Angle for the title at Royal Rumble, but lost both times. Henry's next feud was against The Undertaker, facing him at WrestleMania 22 in a Casket match, but The Undertaker defeated Henry. There were talks about Henry ending The Undertaker's WrestleMania streak; in an interview on Heavy, Henry stated that the decision was close and that if they did ask him about it he would have refused, stating he did not want to carry that weight.

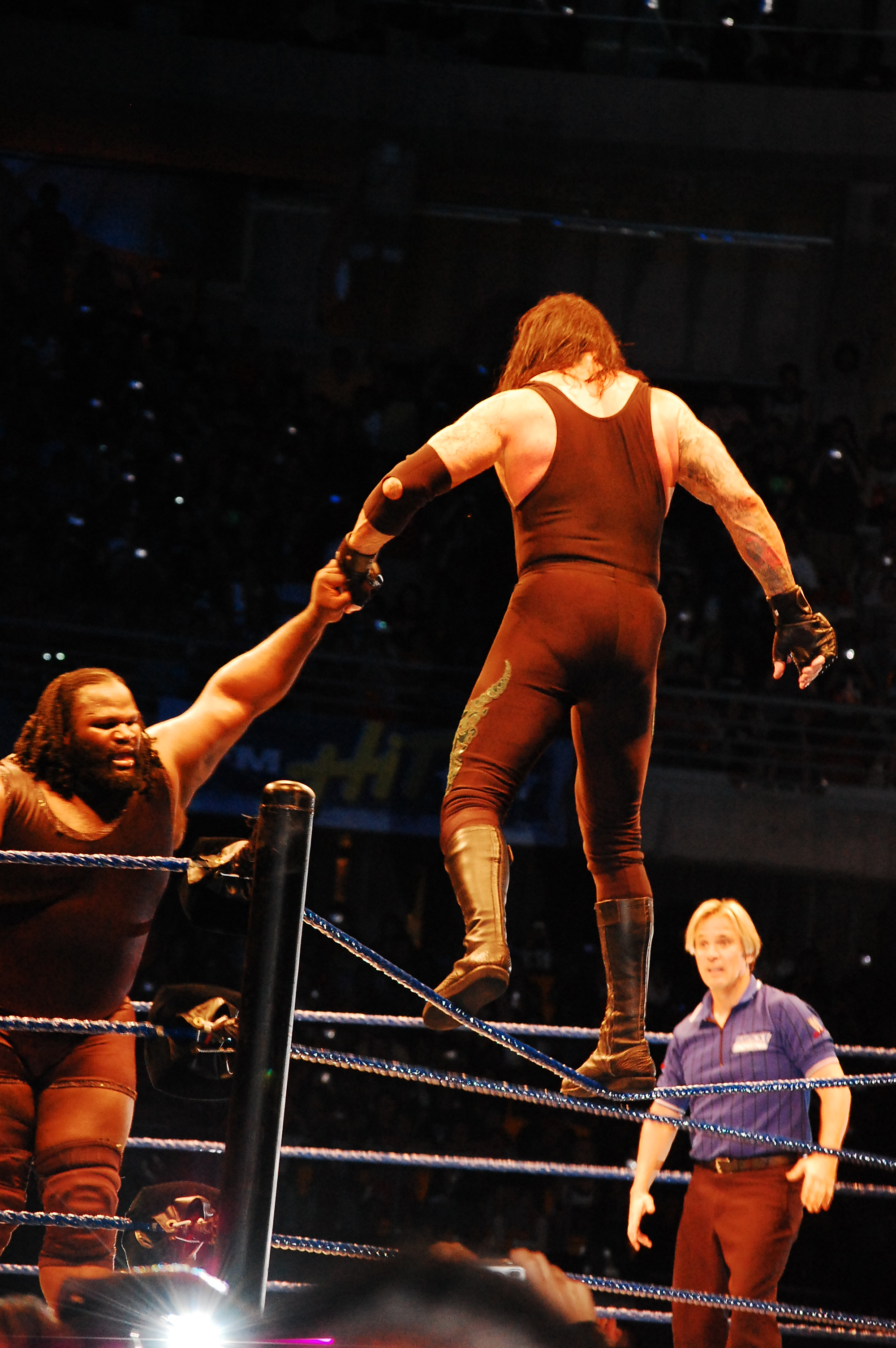
Henry lost to The Undertaker at WrestleMania 22 and Unforgiven 2007

Henry feuded with the returning Batista, being booked to a match at The Great American Bash on July 23. Weeks before that event, however, on the July 15 episode of Saturday Night's Main Event, Henry suffered an injury, canceling the scheduled match. Doctors later found that Henry completely tore his patella tendon off the bone and split his patella completely in two.

Henry returned on the May 11, 2007 episode of SmackDown!, after weeks of vignettes hyping his return. Henry attacked The Undertaker after a World Heavyweight Championship steel cage match with Batista, allowing Edge to take advantage of the situation and use his Money in the Bank contract. Henry and The Undertaker wrestled at Unforgiven on September 16, losing to him after being given a Last Ride. Two weeks later, Henry lost a rematch to The Undertaker after The Undertaker performed a chokeslam on Henry.

==== ECW Champion (2007–2009) ====
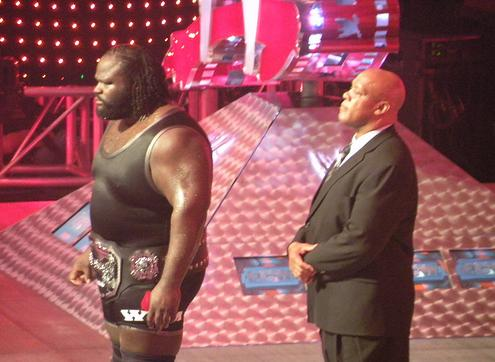
Henry as ECW Champion with Tony Atlas

After a short hiatus, Henry returned to WWE programming on the October 23 episode, working on the ECWbrand, working with Big Daddy V and was briefly managed by Big Daddy V's manager, Matt Striker. At Armageddon on December 16, Henry and Big Daddy V defeated Kane and Punk. As part of the 2008 WWE Supplemental Draft on June 25, Henry was drafted to the ECW brand and won the ECW Championship at Night of Champions, when he defeated former champion Kane and Big Show in a triple threat match. During his reign, he was managed by Hall of Famer Tony Atlas and was given a new belt design. On August 17, Henry retained the title against Matt Hardy at SummerSlam by disqualification; but lost it to Hardy at Unforgiven on September 7 in a Championship Scramble match.

Henry attempted to regain the championship throughout the year, and had a match against Hardy at No Mercy on October 5, but failed as he was unsuccessful. Henry and Atlas then engaged in a feud against Finlay and Hornswoggle, which included Henry losing a Belfast Brawl to Finlay at Armageddon on December 14. On the March 3, 2009 episode of ECW, Henry defeated Santino Marella to qualify for the Money in the Bank ladder match at WrestleMania 25 on April 5, and was involved in a series of matches with the other competitors on Raw, SmackDown, and ECW. He was unsuccessful at WrestleMania, however, as CM Punk won the match. In May, Henry began a rivalry with Evan Bourne, which began after Bourne defeated Henry by countout on the May 26 episode of ECW.

==== Tag team championship pursuits (2009–2011) ====
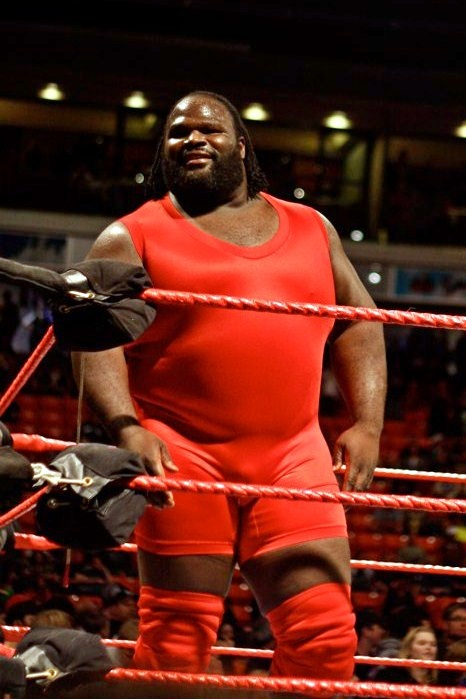
Henry before a tag team match with Montel Vontavious Porter

On June 29, Henry was traded to the Raw brand and redebuted for the brand that night as the third opponent in a three-on-one gauntlet match against WWE Champion Randy Orton, which he won, turning Henry into a face in the process. In August, Henry formed a tag team with Montel Vontavious Porter and the two challenged the Unified WWE Tag Team Champions Jeri-Show (Chris Jericho and The Big Show) for the title at Breaking Point on September 13, but were unsuccessful. They stopped teaming afterwards, becoming involved in separate storylines, until the February 15, 2010 episode of Raw in which they defeated the Unified WWE Tag Team Champions The Big Show and The Miz in a non-title match. The next week they challenged The Big Show and The Miz in a title match but were unsuccessful. At Extreme Rules on April 25, Henry and MVP fought for a chance to become number one contenders to the Unified WWE Tag Team Championship, but were the second team eliminated in a gauntlet match by The Big Show and The Miz. Ultimately, The Hart Dynasty (Tyson Kidd and David Hart Smith) won the match.

Henry mentored Lucky Cannon in the second season of NXT. Cannon was eliminated on the August 10 episode of NXT. In September, Henry began teaming with Evan Bourne, starting at the Night of Champions pay-per-view on September 19, where they entered a Tag Team Turmoil for the WWE Tag Team Championship. They made it to the final two before being defeated by Cody Rhodes and Drew McIntyre. The team came to an end in October when Bourne suffered an injury and was taken out of action. Henry then formed a team with Yoshi Tatsu on the November 29 episode of Raw, defeating WWE Tag Team Champions Justin Gabriel and Heath Slater, after a distraction by John Cena. They received a shot at the championship the next week, in a fatal four-way elimination tag team match, which also included The Usos and Santino Marella and Vladimir Kozlov. Henry and Tatsu were the first team eliminated in the match.

==== World Heavyweight Champion (2011–2012) ====
On the April 25, 2011 episode of Raw, Henry was drafted to the SmackDown brand as part of the 2011 WWE draft. In the main event of the night, Henry attacked his teammates John Cena and Christian, turning heel in the process. On the May 27 episode of SmackDown, Henry participated in a Triple Threat match against Sheamus and Christian to decide the number one contender to the World Heavyweight Championship, which was won by Sheamus. On the June 17 episode of SmackDown, Henry was scheduled to face an angry and emotionally unstable Big Show, who warned Henry not to get into the ring; Henry ignored the warning and Big Show assaulted him before the match could begin. This act ignited a feud between the two; Henry attacked Big Show both backstage and during matches while on the July 1 episode of SmackDown, Big Show's music played during Henry's match against Randy Orton, causing Henry to be counted out and costing him a shot at the World Heavyweight Championship. Henry reacted by destroying the audio equipment and attacking a technician. Henry faced Big Show in a singles match at Money in the Bank and won. After the match, Henry crushed Big Show's leg with a chair, (kayfabe) injuring him, an act Henry later referenced as an induction into the "Hall of Pain". Henry did the same to Kane on the next episode of SmackDown, and in the months ahead, Vladimir Kozlov and The Great Khali suffered the same fate.

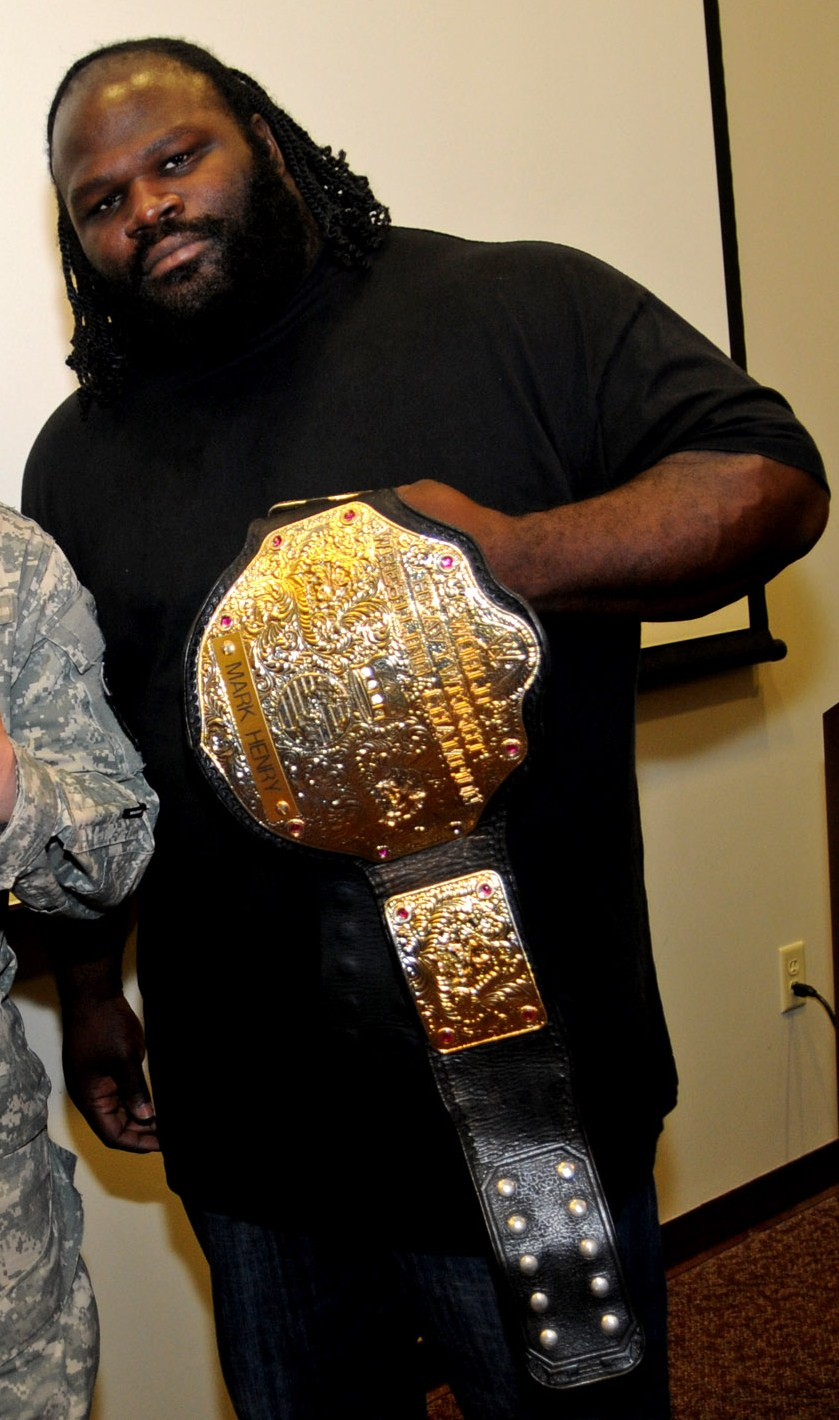
Henry as World Heavyweight Champion

On the July 29 episode of SmackDown, Henry was informed that he could no longer compete as no one dared to fight him, but Sheamus interrupted, saying that he wasn't afraid of Henry before slapping him. At SummerSlam, Henry defeated Sheamus by count-out after slamming him through a ring barricade. On the August 19 episode of SmackDown, Henry won a 20-man Battle Royal to become the number one contender for the World Heavyweight Championship to face Randy Orton at Night of Champions, and throughout weeks on SmackDown and Raw, Henry regularly attacked Orton, getting an advantage over him. At Night of Champions, Henry defeated Orton to win the World Heavyweight Championship for the first time. Henry successfully defended the title against Orton at Hell in a Cell in a Hell in a Cell match.

On the October 7 episode of SmackDown, Big Show returned and chokeslammed Henry through the announce table, thus earning a title shot against Henry at Vengeance. During the match, Henry superplexed Big Show from the top rope, causing the ring to collapse from the impact and the match to be ruled a no contest. Henry began a feud with the Money in the Bank briefcase holder Daniel Bryan on the November 4 episode of SmackDown, challenging Bryan to a non-title match to prove that Bryan could not become champion. During the match, Big Show knocked out Henry, making him win by disqualification. Big Show then urged Bryan to cash in his contract, but Henry recovered and attacked both Bryan and Big Show before the match could start. At Survivor Series, Henry retained the World Heavyweight Championship against Big Show after a low blow that disqualified Henry. Angered by Henry's cowardice, Big Show crushed Henry's ankle with a steel chair. On the November 25 episode of SmackDown, Henry was knocked out again by Big Show, at which point Bryan cashed in his briefcase for a title match and quickly pinned Henry. However, SmackDown General Manager Theodore Long revealed that Henry was not medically cleared to compete and voided the match, so Henry remained champion and the briefcase was returned to Bryan. Later that night, Bryan won a fatal-four-way match to face Henry for the World Heavyweight Championship in a steel cage. On the November 29 episode of SmackDown, Henry defeated Bryan in a steel cage match to retain the World Heavyweight Championship.

Then at TLC: Tables, Ladders & Chairs, Henry lost the World Heavyweight Championship to Big Show in a chairs match. After the match, Henry knocked Big Show out, resulting in Daniel Bryan cashing in his Money in the Bank contract to win his first World Heavyweight Championship. On the January 20 episode of SmackDown, Bryan retained the championship against Henry in a lumberjack match after Bryan provoked the lumberjacks to come in and attack them to cause a no contest. At the 2012 Royal Rumble event, Henry faced Bryan and Big Show in a triple threat steel cage match for the World Heavyweight Championship; Bryan escaped the cage to retain the title. On the February 3 episode of SmackDown, Henry was suspended indefinitely (in storyline) by SmackDown General Manager Theodore Long, after Henry physically accosted Long as he demanded a one-on-one rematch that night with Bryan. In reality, Henry had hyper-extended his knee the previous week. Henry returned to in-ring action on the February 20 episode of Raw SuperShow, losing to Sheamus. On the April 2 and 9 episodes of Raw SuperShow, Henry faced CM Punk for the WWE Championship which he won by count-out and disqualification; as a result, Punk retained his title. On the April 16 episode of Raw SuperShow, Punk defeated Henry in a no-disqualification, no count-out match to retain the WWE Championship. On May 14, Henry announced he was going under a career-threatening surgery for an injury.

==== Final feuds (2013–2017) ====
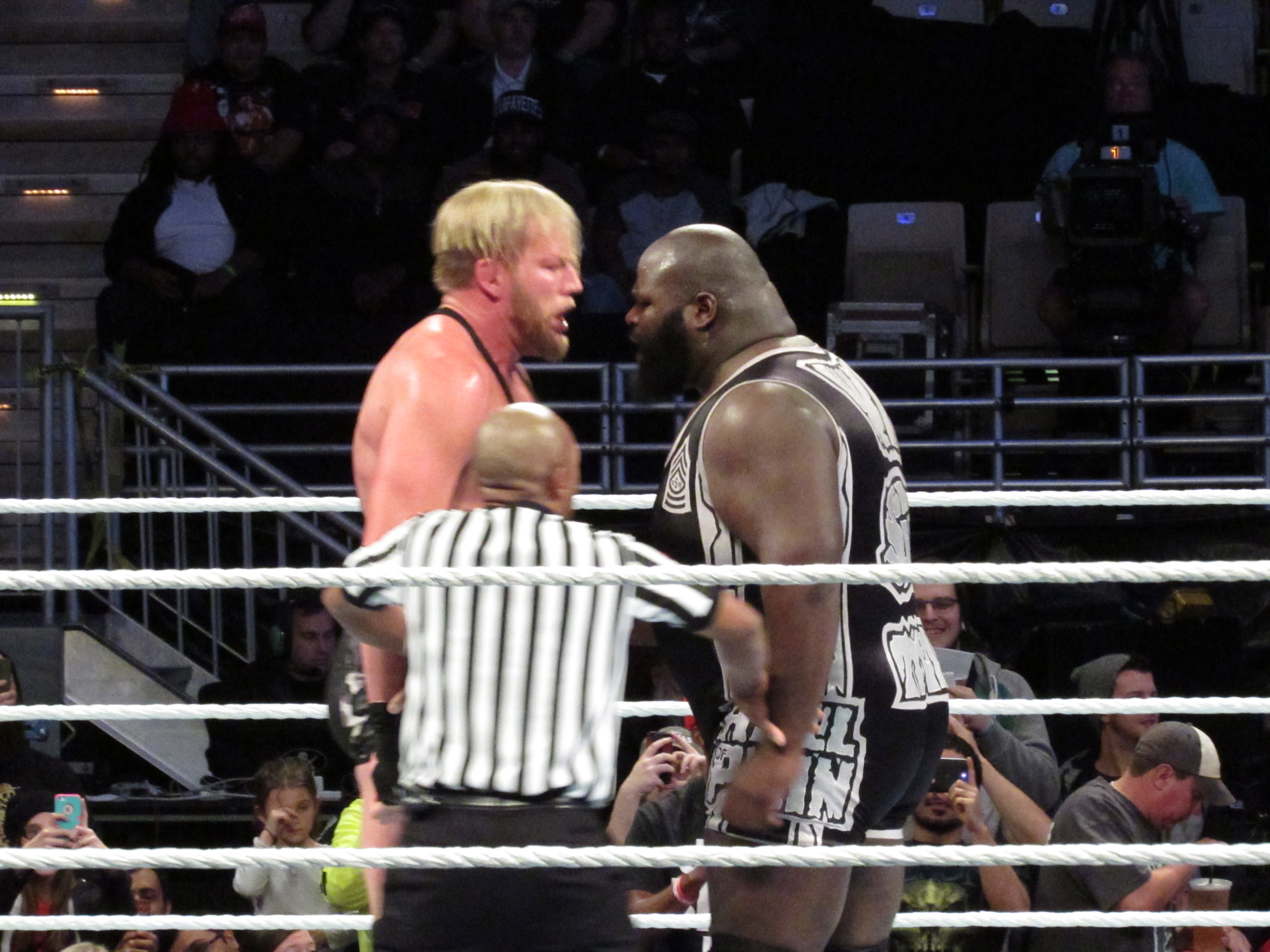
Henry facing Jack Swagger in January 2015

After a nine-month absence, Henry made his return on the February 4, 2013 episode of Raw, brutally attacking Daniel Bryan, Rey Mysterio and Sin Cara. Four days later on SmackDown, Henry defeated Randy Orton to earn a spot in the number one contenders' Elimination Chamber match for the World Heavyweight Championship at Elimination Chamber. At the pay-per-view on February 17, Henry eliminated Daniel Bryan and Kane before being eliminated by Randy Orton. After his elimination, Henry attacked the three remaining participants before being escorted out by WWE officials. Henry then began a feud with Ryback after several non-verbal confrontations. On the March 15 episode of SmackDown, Henry was defeated by Ryback via disqualification, following interference from The Shield. Afterward, Henry delivered the World's Strongest Slam to Ryback three times in a row. On April 7 at WrestleMania 29, Henry defeated Ryback in a singles match. Later that month, Henry reignited a feud with Sheamus by repeatedly attacking Sheamus backstage. Henry and Sheamus then challenged each other in tests of strength, but with Sheamus unable to best Henry, he resorted to attacking Henry with Brogue Kicks. After Sheamus (during his match) Brogue Kicked Henry (who was on commentary), Henry snapped and brutally whipped Sheamus with a belt. This led to a strap match on May 19 at Extreme Rules, where Sheamus emerged victorious. With the loss to Sheamus, Henry declared that he was "going home".

After being absent from television due to injuries, Henry used social media to tease his retirement. On the June 17 episode of Raw, Henry returned, interrupting WWE Champion John Cena and delivering an emotional retirement speech, which was revealed as a ruse when Henry gave Cena a World's Strongest Slam after concluding his speech. The segment was highly praised by fans and critics. With Henry stating his intent to challenge for the "only title he's never held", he was granted a WWE Championship match against Cena at Money in the Bank. On July 14 at the pay-per-view, Henry failed in his title challenge against Cena after submitting to the STF. The following night on Raw, Henry cut a promo to congratulate Cena on his win and asked for a rematch for SummerSlam, but was ultimately attacked by The Shield, turning face in the process for the first time since 2011. Henry continued his face turn the following week, by confronting The Shield and teaming together with The Usos to fend them off. Henry and the Usos went on to lose to The Shield in two six-man tag team matches, the first on the July 29 episode of Raw, and the second on the August 7 episode of Main Event. On the August 12 episode of Raw, Henry competed in a Battle Royal to determine the number one contender for the United States Championship, but was the last man eliminated by Rob Van Dam. After the match, Henry and Van Dam were confronted by The Shield, before the returning Big Show came to their aid. Four days later on SmackDown, Henry, Show, and Van Dam defeated The Shield in a six-man tag team match. After a suspected hamstring injury on August 31 at the TD Garden in Boston Massachusetts, Henry was cleared to compete. Henry, however, took time off and during his time off, he dropped down to 405 lb (184 kg) and shaved his head bald.

Henry returned to in-ring action on November 24, 2013, at Survivor Series, answering Ryback's open challenge and defeating him. On the January 6, 2014 episode of Raw, Henry tried to confront Brock Lesnar during separate encounters after Lesnar's return, resulting in Henry receiving an F-5 the first time and then Lesnar injured Henry's arm after getting it in a kimura lock hold, causing Henry to wail in pain and be absent. He returned on February 10 episode of Raw, and answered Dean Ambrose's open challenge for the United States Championship, but was unable to win the title due to interference by the rest of The Shield. In March, Henry suffered another attack from Lesnar, this time resulting in Henry receiving an F-5 through the announcing table.

On the August 4 episode of Raw, Henry defeated Damien Sandow after a few months absence. That same week on SmackDown, Henry formed a tag team with Big Show to defeat RybAxel (Ryback and Curtis Axel). On the August 18 episode of Raw, Henry entered a feud with Rusev by attacking him. This set up a match between Henry and Rusev at Night of Champions, which he lost by submission. The following night on Raw, he lost to Rusev again by knockout via submission. On the October 27 episode of Raw, Henry attacked Big Show during their tag team match against Gold and Stardust, and turning heel in the process. On the November 3 episode of Raw, Henry lost to Big Show via disqualification and slammed Big Show onto the steel steps. On the November 10 Raw, he joined The Authority's team to face John Cena's team at Survivor Series. On November 23 at Survivor Series, Henry was the first to be eliminated from Team Authority 50 seconds into the match after being knocked out by Big Show. Henry then took another hiatus due to an unspecified injury.

Henry returned on the March 12, 2015 episode of SmackDown, confronting Roman Reigns for having a lack of identity and for not being respected, resulting in Reigns attacking Henry. The attack caused Henry to become a believer in Reigns, and turning face in the process. Henry was unsuccessful in the Elimination Chamber match for the vacant Intercontinental Championship at Elimination Chamber, replacing Rusev who was injured, but was eliminated by Sheamus At Royal Rumble pre-show on January 24, 2016, Henry teamed with Jack Swagger to win a Fatal 4-Way tag team match to earn their spots in the Royal Rumble match. Despite this victory, Henry entered the Rumble match at #22 and lasted only 47 seconds when he was quickly eliminated by The Wyatt Family. At WrestleMania 32, Henry entered his third André the Giant Memorial Battle Royal, where he made it to the final six competitors until being eliminated by Kane and Darren Young.

On July 19, at the 2016 WWE draft, Henry was drafted to Raw. On the August 1 episode of Raw, Henry claimed he still "had a lot left in him" when he spoke of reviving the Hall of Pain and his participation in the Olympics. Raw General Manager Mick Foley gave Henry a United States Championship match, but Henry would lose by submission to Rusev. In October, Henry allied himself with R-Truth and Goldust in a feud against Titus O'Neil and The Shining Stars (Primo and Epico), in which Henry's team came out victorious. Henry returned at the Royal Rumble on January 29, 2017, as entrant number 6, only to be eliminated by Braun Strowman. He unsuccessfully competed in the Andre the Giant Memorial Battle Royal at WrestleMania 33.

==== Retirement and WWE Hall of Famer (2017–2021) ====
Following WrestleMania 33, Henry retired and transitioned into a backstage producers role. He later made his return in a backstage cameo at the Raw 25 Years event in January 2018. On March 19, 2018, it was announced that Henry would be inducted into the WWE Hall of Fame by Big Show, who was one of his closest friends in WWE. On April 27, at the Greatest Royal Rumble, Henry participated in the event's Royal Rumble match, scoring 3 eliminations, but was himself eliminated by Daniel Bryan and Dolph Ziggler. In early 2019, Henry took on a backstage mentoring role helping talent work on their off-air attitude, including cleanliness and respect in the locker room.

Henry appeared on the January 4, 2021 episode of Raw, on its Raw Legends Night special, where in he appeared riding on a scooter due to an injured leg. He was verbally confronted by Randy Orton in what was his final appearance in WWE.

=== All Elite Wrestling (2021–2024) ===
Henry made his debut for All Elite Wrestling (AEW) on May 30, 2021, at Double or Nothing where it was announced that he would be a part of the commentary team for its new show AEW Rampage, as well as a coach. On May 27, 2024, Henry announced that he would not be renewing his contract with AEW and would be leaving the company upon its expiration the following day on May 28, 2024.

=== Return to WWE (2025–present) ===
In March 2025, reports stated that Henry had signed a WWE Legends deal. However, in an August 2026 interview with ITR Wrestling, Henry clarified that he did not work for WWE and described his agreement as a "nostalgia deal", which allowed the company to use his name and likeness for merchandise and video games. He also stated that his connection to WWE included appearing on WWE Radio through SiriusXM.

== Personal life ==
Henry lives in Austin, Texas with his wife Jana; they have a son and a daughter. He drives a Hummer that he won in the 2002 Arnold Strongman Classic. On September 10, 2012, Henry served as one of the pallbearers for actor Michael Clarke Duncan's funeral.

In March 2019, Henry pledged to donate his brain to CTE research once he dies.

== Filmography ==
=== Film ===
Year	Title	Role
2010	MacGruber	Tut Beemer
2014	A Haunted House 2	Prisoner
2015	The Flintstones & WWE: Stone Age SmackDown!	Marble Henry
2016	Incarnate	Bouncer

=== Video games ===
Henry appears in the following licensed wrestling video games:

Year	Title
1999	WWF Attitude
1999	WWF WrestleMania 2000
2000	WWF SmackDown!
2000	WWF No Mercy
2000	WWF SmackDown! 2: Know Your Role
2002	WWE SmackDown! Shut Your Mouth
2003	WWE Raw 2
2006	WWE SmackDown! vs. Raw 2007
2007	WWE SmackDown vs. Raw 2008
2008	WWE SmackDown vs. Raw 2009
2009	WWE SmackDown vs. Raw 2010
2010	WWE SmackDown vs. Raw 2011
2011	WWE All Stars
2011	WWE '12
2012	WWE WrestleFest
2012	WWE '13
2013	WWE 2K14
2014	WWE SuperCard
2014	WWE 2K15
2015	WWE 2K16
2016	WWE 2K17
2017	WWE: Champions
2017	WWE 2K18
2019	WWE 2K20
2020	WWE 2K Battlegrounds
2025	WWE 2K25
2026	WWE 2K26

== Championships, records, and accomplishments ==
=== Powerlifting ===
- Championships Participation – High School Level
  - Two times 1st place in Texas State High School Powerlifting TEAM Championships (in Division I under Silsbee High School)
  - 1st place in Texas State High School Powerlifting Championships 1988 in SHW division
  - 1st place in Texas State High School Powerlifting Championships 1989 in SHW division
  - 1st place in Texas State High School Powerlifting Championships 1990 in SHW division
  - 1st place in National High School Powerlifting Championships 1990 in SHW division at age 18
  - results: Powerlifting Total – 2,033 lb (922 kg) (832 + 501 + 700 lb (377 + 227 + 318 kg)+
- Championships Participation – Junior&Senior Level
  - 1st place in International Junior (20–23) Powerlifting Championships 1991 in SHW division at age 20
  - 2nd place in Men's USPF Senior National Championships 1990 in SHW division at age 19
    - results: Powerlifting Total – 2,006.2 lb (910.0 kg) (365.0 + 212.5 + 332.5 lb (165.6 + 96.4 + 150.8 kg)
  - 1st place in ADFPA (USAPL) National Powerlifting Championships 1995 in SHW division at age 24
    - results: Powerlifting Total – 2,314.8 lb (1,050.0 kg) (948.0 + 462.9 + 903.9 lb (430.0 + 210.0 + 410.0 kg) raw with wraps
  - 1st place in WDFPF World Powerlifting Championships 1995 in SHW division at age 24
    - results: Powerlifting Total – 2,336.9 lb (1,060.0 kg) (953.5 + 518.1 + 865.3 lb (432.5 + 235.0 + 392.5 kg) raw with wraps
  - 1st place in USAPL National Powerlifting Championships 1997 in SHW division at age 26
    - results: Powerlifting Total – 2,248.7 lb (1,020.0 kg) (903.9 + 496.0 + 848.8 lb (410.0 + 225.0 + 385.0 kg) raw with wraps
- Records*
  - Teen III (18–19 years) Level
    - Teen-age World Records in the squat at 832 lb (377 kg) and total at 2,033 lb (922 kg) in SHW class (+regardless of weight class) set in April 1990 at The National High School Powerlifting Championships at age 18
    - Teen-age US American Records in the squat at 832 lb (377 kg), bench press 501 lb (227 kg), dead lift 700 lb (320 kg) and total at 2,033 lb (922 kg) set in April 1990 at The National High School Powerlifting Championships at age 18
    - Texas state and US American Teen-age record holder in all four powerlifting categories – the squat at 832 lb (377 kg), bench press at 525 lb (238 kg) and deadlift at 815 lb (370 kg) as well as the total at 2,033 lb (922 kg) at age 19.
    - Current Texas state and US American Teen-age record holder in the squat at 936.75 lb (424.90 kg) in SHW class (+regardless of weight class) since 1991
  - Collegiate Level
    - Current Texas State Collegiate Record holder in the squat at 936.75 lb (424.90 kg) in SHW class (+regardless of weight class) since 1991 (best in America as well but not registered as such)
  - Junior Level (20–23 years)
    - Current Texas State Junior Record holder in the deadlift at 850 lb (390 kg) in SHW class (+regardless of weight class) since 1995 (best in America as well but not registered as such)
  - Senior Level (24+ years)
    - Current Texas State Record holder in the squat at 954 lb (433 kg), the deadlift at 950 lb (430 kg) and the total at 2,337 lb (1,060 kg) in SHW class (+regardless of weight class) since 1995
    - Former All-time raw (unequipped) squat World Record holder at 948 lb (430 kg) (drug-tested as well as non drug-tested) in SHW class (+regardless of weight class) from July 16, 1995, to October 29, 1995
    - Former All-time raw (unequipped) squat World Record holder at 953.5 lb (432.5 kg) (drug-tested as well as non drug-tested) in SHW class from October 29, 1995, to June 7, 2010** (+regardless of weight class until November 4, 2007***)
    - Former All-time raw (unequipped) deadlift World Record holder at 903.9 lb (410.0 kg) (drug-tested as well as non drug-tested) in SHW class from July 16, 1995, to May 23, 2010**** (+regardless of weight class until July 4, 2009*****)
    - Current All-time drug-tested raw (unequipped) squat World Record holder at 953.5 lb (432.5 kg) in SHW class (+regardless of weight class) since October 29, 1995
    - Current All-time drug-tested raw (unequipped) deadlift World Record holder at 903.9 lb (410.0 kg) in SHW class only since July 16, 1995
    - Current All-time drug-tested raw (unequipped) Powerlifting Total World Record holder at 2,336.9 lb (1,060.0 kg) in SHW class (+regardless of weight class) since October 29, 1995
    - Current All-time American Record holder in the raw deadlift at 903.9 lb (410.0 kg) (drug-tested as well as non drug-tested) in SHW class (+regardless of weight class) since July 16, 1995
    - Current American Record holder in the deadlift at 903.9 lb (410.0 kg) (drug-tested as well as non drug-tested) in SHW class (+regardless of weight class and equipment) since July 16, 1995
    - Current All-time US National Championship Record holder in the deadlift at 903.9 lb (410.0 kg) (drug-tested as well as non drug-tested) in SHW class (+regardless of weight class and equipment) since July 16, 1995
  - Federation Records
    - World Drug-Free Powerlifting Federation (WDFPF) World Records
      - Current WDFPF World Record holder in the squat at 953.5 lb (432.5 kg), the deadlift at 865.3 lb (392.5 kg) and the total at 2,336.9 lb (1,060.0 kg) in SHW class (+regardless of weight class and equipment) since October 29, 1995 (categorized as "open equipped", despite performed in singlet&knee sleeves only/without suit)
    - U.S.A. Powerlifting (USAPL) US American Records
      - Current USAPL US American Record holder in the deadlift at 903.9 lb (410.0 kg) in SHW class (+regardless of weight class and equipment) since July 16, 1995
      - Current US National Championship Record holder in the deadlift at 903.9 lb (410.0 kg) in SHW class (+regardless of weight class and equipment) since July 16, 1995
- Special Powerlifting Honors
  - "The World's Strongest Teen-ager" by the Los Angeles Times in April 1990.
  - Mark Henry was voted in the All-time Top 25 All-Mens US Powerlifting Nationals Team in 2007.
  - Mark Henry's 948 lb (430 kg) raw squat and 903.9 lb (410.0 kg) deadlift, done on July 16, 1995, is the joint-seventeenth highest raw "squat-pull-2-lift-total" (squat+deadlift=1,851.9 lb (840.0 kg)) ever lifted in a competition.
  - Mark also holds the fourth heaviest drug-tested raw (unequipped) Powerlifting Total in history at 2,336.9 lb (1,060.0 kg),

=== Weightlifting ===
- Olympic Games
  - Olympic Games team member representing USA at the Olympics 1992 in Barcelona, Spain, finishing 10th place in SHW division at age 21
  - Team Captain of the Olympic Weightlifting team representing USA at the Olympics 1996 in Atlanta, Georgia, finishing 14th in SHW division due to back injury at age 25
- Pan American Games
  - Silver Medalist in the Olympic weightlifting Total in SHW (+108) division at the Pan American Games 1995 in Mar del Plata, Argentina at age 23
    - result: total – 804 pounds
  - Gold Medalist in the Snatch in SHW (+108) division at the Pan American Games 1995 in Mar del Plata, Argentina at age 23
    - result: snatch – 391 1/4 pounds, setting an American record
  - Bronze Medalist in Clean and jerk in SHW (+108) division at the Pan American Games 1995 in Mar del Plata, Argentina at age 23
    - result: clean and jerk – snatch 412 3/4 pounds
- North America, Central America, Caribbean Islands (NACAC) Championships
  - 1st place in North America, Central America, Caribbean Islands Championships 1996 in SHW (+108 kg) division
- U.S. National Weightlifting Championships
  - 1st place in U.S. National Junior Weightlifting Championships 1991 in SHW (+110 kg) division at age 19
    - results: total: 326.0 kg – snatch: 156.0 kg / clean&jerk: 170.0 kg
  - 4th place in U.S. Senior National Weightlifting Championships 1991 in SHW (+110 kg) division at age 19
    - results: total: 325.0 kg – snatch: 150.0 kg / clean&jerk: 175.0 kg
  - 3rd place in U.S. Senior National Weightlifting Championships 1992 in SHW (+110 kg) division at age 20
    - results: total: 365.0 kg – snatch: 165.0 kg / clean&jerk: 200.0 kg
  - 1st place in U.S. Senior National Weightlifting Championships 1993 in SHW (+108 kg) division at age 21
    - results: total: 385.0 kg – snatch: 175.0 kg / clean&jerk: 210.0 kg
  - 1st place in U.S. Senior National Weightlifting Championships 1994 in SHW (+108 kg) division at age 22
    - results: total: 387.5 kg – snatch: 172.5 kg / clean&jerk: 215.0 kg
  - 1st place in U.S. Senior National Weightlifting Championships 1996 in SHW (+108 kg) division at age 24
    - results: total: 400.0 kg – snatch: 180.0 kg / clean&jerk: 220.0 kg
    - Mark Henry was voted as the #1 outstanding lifter of the championships
- U.S. Olympic Festival Championships
  - 1st place in U.S. Olympic Festival Championships 1993 in SHW (+108 kg) division at age 22
  - 1st place in U.S. Olympic Festival Championships 1994 in SHW (+108 kg) division at age 23
- USA Weightlifting American Open Championships
  - 2nd place in the American Open Weightlifting Championships 1991 in SHW (+110 kg) division at age 20
  - 1st place in the American Open Weightlifting Championships 1992 in SHW (+110 kg) division at age 21
- RECORDS
  - Junior US American record holder (+110 kg) in the Snatch at 162.5 kg, Clean and jerk at 202.5 kg, and Total at 362.5 kg (1986–1992)
  - Senior US American record holder (+108 kg) in the Snatch at 180.0 kg, Clean and jerk at 220.0 kg, and Total at 400.0 kg (1993–1997)

=== Strength athletics ===
- Arnold Classic
  - Arnold Strongman Classic – Winner 2002
- First man in history to one-hand clean and push press the "unliftable" Thomas Inch dumbbell (172 lb (78 kg); 2 3/8 inches (6.0 cm) diameter handle)
- The Second Strongest Man That Ever Lived according to Flex Magazine
- International Sports Hall of Fame
  - International Sports Hall of Fame (Class of 2012)

=== Professional wrestling ===
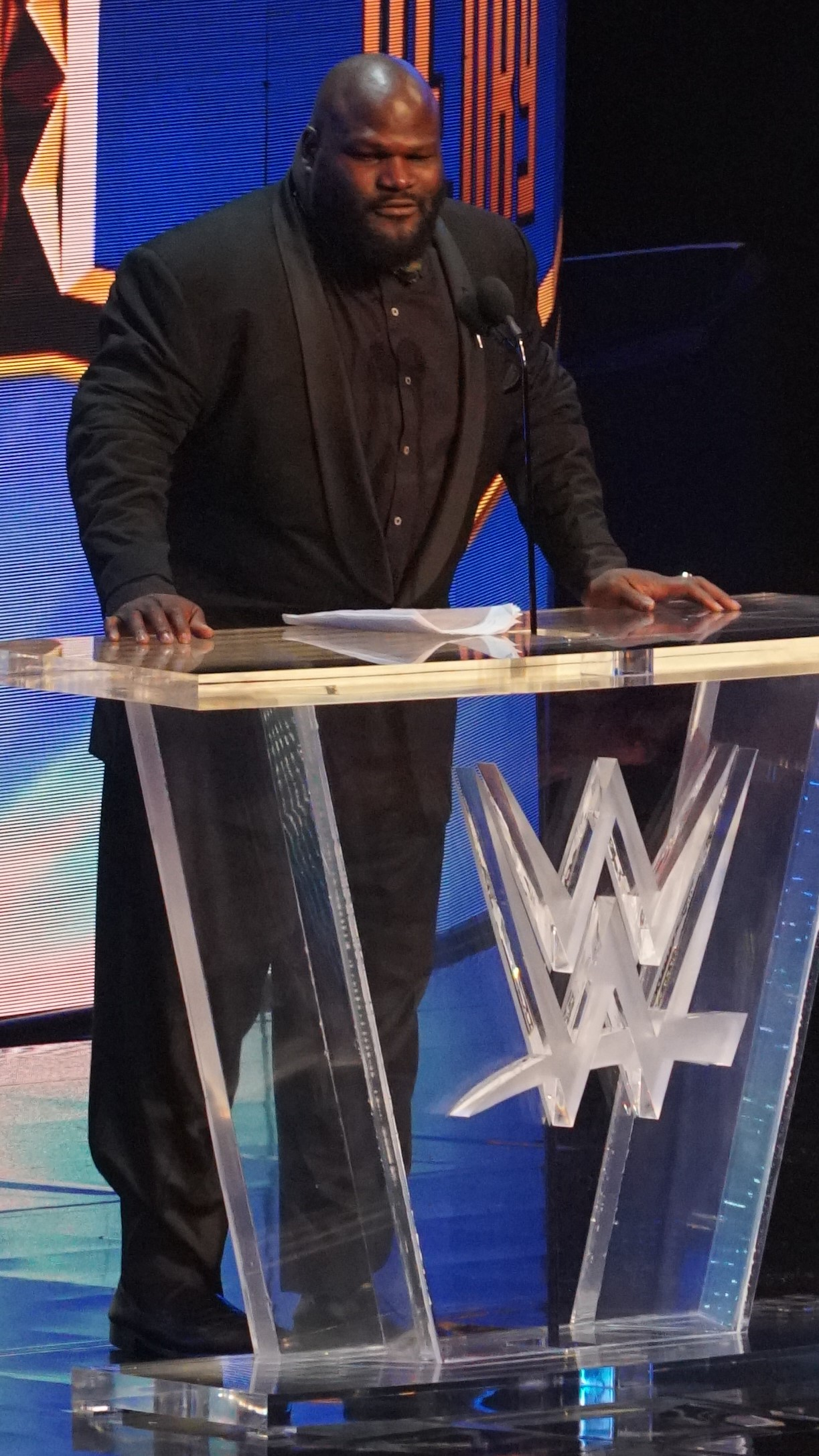
Mark Henry being inducted into the WWE Hall of Fame in April 2018

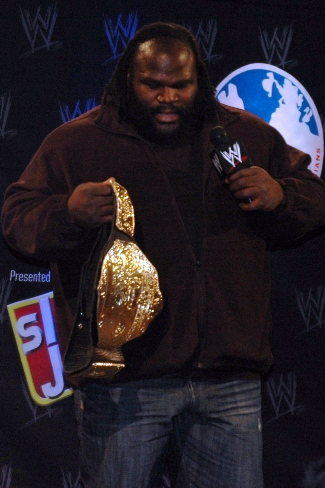
Henry as World Heavyweight Champion in 2011

- Cauliflower Alley Club
  - Iron Mike Mazurki Award (2019)
- George Tragos/Lou Thesz Professional Wrestling Hall of Fame
  - Frank Gotch Award (2021)
- Pro Wrestling Illustrated
  - Most Improved Wrestler of the Year (2011)
  - Ranked No. 9 of the top 500 singles wrestlers in the PWI 500 in 2012
  - Ranked No. 472 of the top 500 greatest wrestlers in the "PWI Years" in 2003
- World Wrestling Federation/Entertainment/WWE
  - World Heavyweight Championship (1 time)
  - ECW Championship (1 time)
  - WWF European Championship (1 time)
  - WWE Hall of Fame (Class of 2018)
  - Brisbane Cup (2006)
  - Slammy Award (3 times)
    - "Holy $#!+ Move of the Year" (2011) Big Show and Mark Henry implode the ring after Henry superplexed him at Vengeance
    - Feat of Strength of the Year (2013) Pulling two trucks with his bare hands
    - Match of the Year (2014) – Team Cena vs. Team Authority at Survivor Series

== See also ==
- List of strongmen
- List of powerlifters
- List of multi-sport athletes
