= Anantanarayanan =

Anantanarayanan is a patronymic. Notable people with the patronymic include:

- Anantanarayanan Madhaviah (1872–1925), Tamil writer known as Madhaviah
- Anantanarayanan Raman (fl. 1990), Australian scientist
