= Jonathan Conneely =

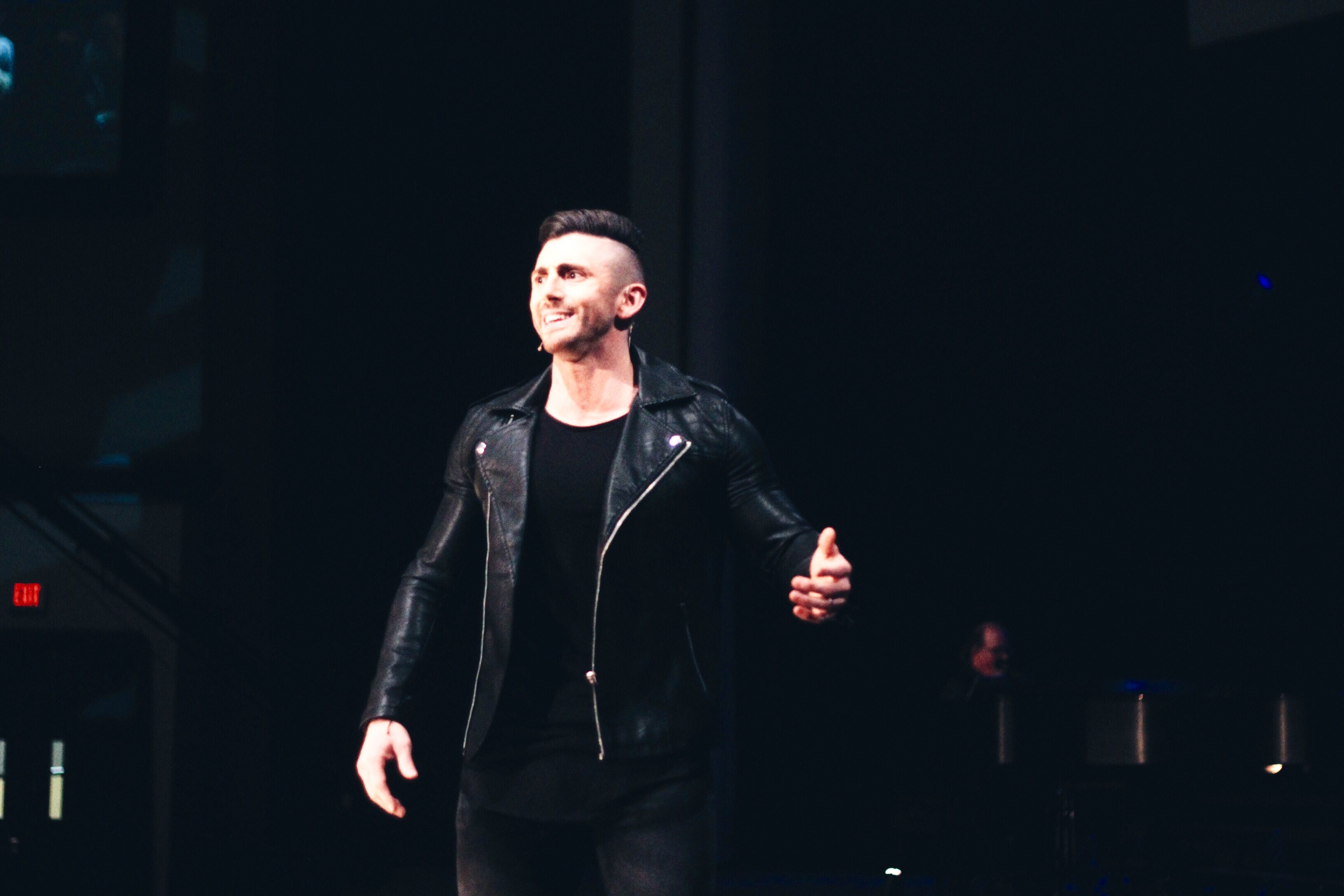
- Born: July 22, 1980 (age 46)
- Education: Oral Roberts University; Victory Bible Institute
- Occupations: Entrepreneur, author and speaker
- Website: coachjc.com

Jonathan Conneely, Coach JC (born July 22, 1980) is an American entrepreneur, non-fiction author and motivational speaker. Conneely is the founder of Bootcamp Tulsa, Dynamic Sports Development and non-profit organisation Fit First Responders.

== Education ==
Conneely received a Bachelor of Science degree from Oral Roberts University, an Olympic Weightlifting certificate from USA Weightlifting and a Practical theology award from Victory Bible Institute in Tulsa.

== Career ==
Conneely started his career as the youngest Director of Strength and Conditioning coach in the nation at the Division 1 level at Oral Roberts University in 1999.

Conneely founded Bootcamp Tulsa, Tulsa's first outdoor fitness program for women in 2008, Dynamic Sports Development, Tulsa's training facility for athletes in 2009, and non-profit Fit First Responders foundation empowering police officers, firefighters, EMSA medics, and National Guard members to win in their fitness, nutrition, and in life in 2015. Conneely created the Secret to Weight Loss Success for Christians, an 8-week life transformation program created for Christians and church small groups worldwide.

Conneely is an author of the books The Secret to Real Weight Loss Success, The Secret to Real Success: How to Have Anything You Want in Business and in Life in 27 Days, The Secret to Weight Loss Success for Christians, and The Secret to Real Athlete Success.

Conneely opened for Donald Trump as his ″Hype Man″ in Arkansas for his 2016 campaign speaking to over 12,000 people, and is the speaker of choice for corporations and churches across the country including Victory Christian Center speaking to over 14,000 members.

== Awards and recognition ==
- 2009 Tulsey Award in Young Entrepreneur of the Year category for Boot-camp Tulsa.
- Tulsa 40 class of 2014 by Tulsa World
- Citizens Appreciation Award from the Tulsa Police Department, a citizen appreciation award from EMSA, and Recognition from the Tulsa Fire Department.
- 2015 Beacon Award for Nonprofits Serving Nonprofits from The Journal Record for his foundation, Fit First Responders.
- Several Counseling Certifications
