= Donald Abrahamson =

American weightlifter (born 1957)

Personal information
- Born: September 19, 1957 (age 69) Athol, Massachusetts, U.S.
- Height: 5 ft 3 1/2 in (161 cm)
- Weight: 148 lb (67 kg)

Sport
- Sport: Weightlifting

Donald Robert Abrahamson Jr. (born September 19, 1957) is an American weightlifter. He competed in the 1984 Summer Olympics.

He initially graduated from the University of Central Florida with a degree in computer science and worked as a software programmer for a time before turning his weightlifting career professional.

He also won the weightlifting competitions at the 1978, 1981, and 1983 U.S. Olympic Festival, as well as winning the U.S. Nationals in 1972 and 1978.
