= Kjell Albin Abrahamson =

Swedish journalist and writer

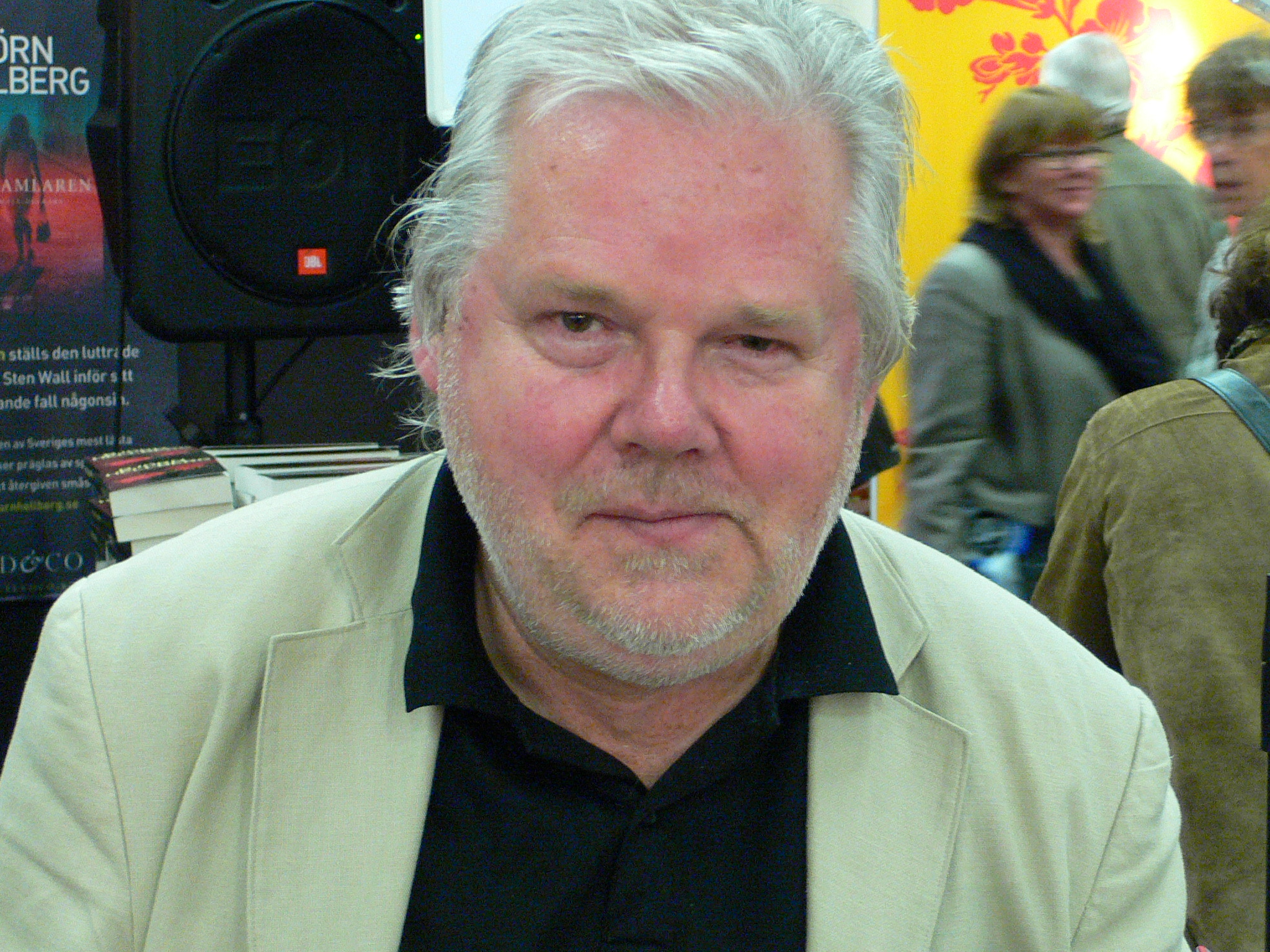
- Kjell Albin Abrahamson during the Göteborg Book Fair in October 2007
- Born: 23 June 1945; Östersunds församling
- Children: Emmy Abrahamson

Kjell Albin Abrahamson (23 June 1945 – 22 September 2016) was a Swedish journalist and author. He served as Swedish National Radio's senior correspondent to Warsaw, Poland, a position he previously held in Moscow, USSR (1986–1990); twice in Vienna, Austria (1990–1994 and 2001–2004); and once before in Warsaw (1994–1997). He also wrote for Sydsvenska Dagbladet and op-ed pieces for Länstidningen of Östersund.

Abrahamson has written a number of initiated books about the transitional characteristics of Eastern Europe and Russia. After the assassination of the Russian journalist Anna Politkovskaya, Abrahamson blamed the Russian President Vladimir Putin, naming him "Gasputin" (an obvious mockery of the president, Gazprom, and the Russian mystic Grigori Rasputin), concluding: "With oil and gas, (Putin) has succeeded, where the Soviet Union – despite having nuclear weapons – failed".

Abrahamson suffered a stroke and died in Gdynia, Poland on 22 September 2016.

== Selected bibliography ==
- Munkavlen och ordet : [Polen 81] = [Knebel i slowo] : [Polska 81], Göteborg : Maneten, 1981. ISBN 978-91-7576-002-5
- Från stormakt till Big Mac : oväsentligheter om Sovjetunionen, Stockholm : Norstedt, 1991. ISBN 978-91-1-911772-4
- Fakta om Tjeckien och Slovakien, Stockholm : Almqvist & Wiksell, 1994. ISBN 978-91-21-15202-7
- Balkan betyder berg : [reporter i krigets Jugoslavien], Stockholm : Fischer, 1995. ISBN 978-91-7054-770-6
- Fakta om Österrike och Schweiz, Stockholm : Almqvist & Wiksell, 1996. ISBN 978-91-21-14561-6
- Polen – diamant i aska (Polska – diament w popiele), Stockholm : Fischer, 1997. ISBN 978-91-7054-850-5
- Sverige och Polen : Szwecja i Polska, Stockholm : Svenska institutet, 2000. ISBN 978-91-520-0642-9
- Den harmynte humoristen, Stockholm : Fischer, 2002. ISBN 978-91-7054-954-0
- Enkel biljett till Polen, Rimbo : Fischer & Co, 2004. ISBN 978-91-85183-04-3
