= Anantanarayanan Raman =

Australian scientist

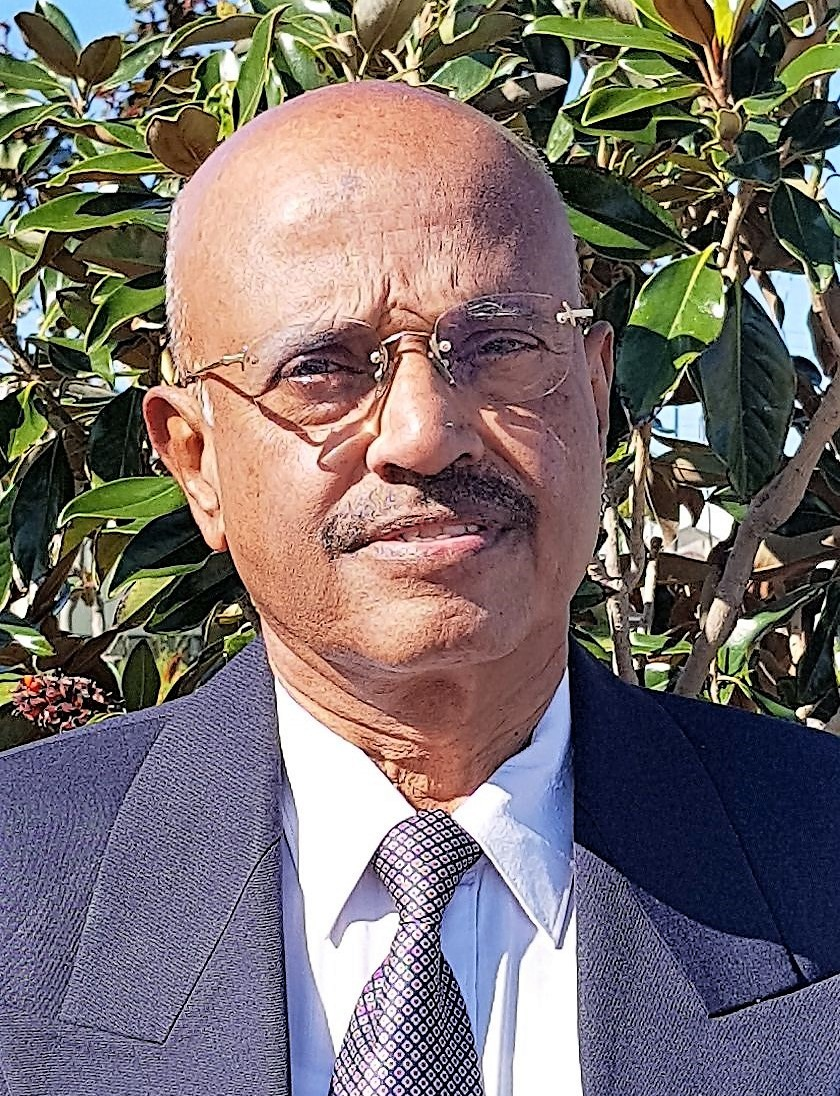
- Education: Loyola College; Presidency College; Madras University; Bucknell University; Université Louis Pasteur
- Occupation: Professor of ecology
- Organizations: Charles Sturt University; CSIRO
- Known for: Ecology, Entomology, Chemical and molecular ecology of insect—plant interactions
- Awards: Australian Academy of Science; Fulbright Association; The German Academic Exchange Service (DAAD); Ian Potter Foundation; Indian National Science Academy (INSA); Vulimiri Ramalingaswami Award

Anantanarayanan Raman is a Professor of Ecology with Charles Sturt University, NSW and a scientist with CSIRO, Australia.

== Education ==
Raman received his bachelor's degree in biology from Loyola College, Madras followed by a master's degree in biology from Presidency College, Madras, and PhD & DSc degrees in ecology from Madras University. As a graduate student, he researched at the Université Louis Pasteur, France, on the nutritional physiology of gall-inducing Tubulifera.

== Research ==
Raman received a Fulbright Award in 1990 to work with Warren G. Abrahamson, of Bucknell University on population ecology and evaluated energetics using the Solidago–Rhopalomyia system. Raman received a German Academic Exchange Service (DAAD) grant to study the aseptic dual culture technique using Pemphigus and its primary host Populus and secondary host Taraxacum, and hypersensitive responses among species of Vitis to infestations of Daktulusphairia vitifoliae. Raman collaborated with Rolf Beiderbeck of Rurpecht–Karls Universität, to work on a protocol for raising plant‑feeding insects on aseptically‑grown tissue callus of its host plant, using the Trialeyrodes–Stellaria system.

In 2000, he received the Ian Potter Foundation’s award and visited the University of Nebraska, to evaluate the nutrient mobilisation in the moth-induced galls of the parthenium weed using stable isotope mass spectrometry. Raman received an Australian Academy of Science fellowship to visit the National Chung Hsing University, Taiwan to study the nutritional ecology of insects invading Machilus Thunbergii. Raman was invited by the Indian National Science Academy (INSA), on a Vulimiri Ramalingaswami Fellowship, through which he conducted workshops and training programs at Indian universities.

== Science history of Madras (Chennai) city and India ==
Raman became interested in chronicling the growth of science in India, particularly that of Madras city, especially that occurred between 1650 and 1947 AD. Raman continues to publish articles related to science history, in professional journals, such as Current Science (Bangalore)., Indian Journal of the History of Science (Indian National Science Academy), New Delhi), Archives of Natural History (Edinburgh), on diverse aspects of science pertaining to environment, medicine, chemistry, physics, mathematics, and engineering. His articles published in Current Science are archived here.

== Most cited papers ==
- Shorthouse JD, Wool D, Raman A. Gall-inducing insects–Nature's most sophisticated herbivores. Basic and Applied Ecology. 2005 Oct 14;6(5):407-11. (Cited 233 times, according to Google Scholar
- Raman A. Insect-induced plant galls of India: unresolved questions. Current Science. 2007 Mar 25:748-57. (Cited 137 times, according to Google Scholar.)
- Raman A. Morphogenesis of insect-induced plant galls: facts and questions. Flora-Morphology, Distribution, Functional Ecology of Plants. 2011 Jun 1;206(6):517-33. (Cited 103 times, according to Google Scholar.)
- Hossain Z, Gurr GM, Wratten SD, Raman A. Habitat manipulation in lucerne Medicago sativa: arthropod population dynamics in harvested and'refuge'crop strips. Journal of Applied Ecology. 2002 Jun 1:445-54. (Cited 103 times, according to Google Scholar.)
- Perović DJ, Gurr GM, Raman A, Nicol HI. Effect of landscape composition and arrangement on biological control agents in a simplified agricultural system: a cost–distance approach. Biological Control. 2010 Mar 1;52(3):263-70. (Cited 96 times, according to Google Scholar.)
- S. K. Florentine, A. Raman & K. Dhileepan. Effects of Gall Induction by Epiblema Strenuana on Gas Exchange, Nutrients, and Energetics in Parthenium Hysterophorus. Biological Control. 2005 Oct 50,787–801 (cited 87 times according to Google Scholar)
- Anamika Sharma, Anwar N. Khan, Sreenath Subrahmanyam, A. Raman, G.S. Taylor and M.J. Fletcher. Salivary proteins of plant-feeding hemipteroids – implication in phytophagy. 2013 Nov 104(2), 117–136. doi:10.1017/S0007485313000618. (Cited 72 times, according to Google Scholar)

== Books and special issues ==
- Muniappan R, Reddy G V P, Raman A (2009) Biological Control of Tropical Weeds using Arthropods. Cambridge University Press, Cambridge, UK. 495+xii pages (ISBN 978-0-521-87791-6; hardback)
- Raman A (1997) Ecology and Evolution of Plant‑feeding Insects in Natural and Man‑made Environments. Backhuys Publishers (Leiden, The Netherlands). 245+xxi pages.
- Raman A, Schaefer CW, Withers T M (2005) Biology, Ecology, and Evolution of Gall-inducing Arthropods [2 Volumes]. Science Publishers, Inc., Enfield, New Hampshire, USA. 817+xxi pages.
- Wool D, Shorthouse JD, Raman A (2005) Adaptive Radiation in Gall-inducing Insects (Proceedings of the Symposium ‘Ecology and Evolution of Gall-inducing Insects’, organised during the XXII International Congress of Entomology, Brisbane, Australia. Special Issue of Basic and Applied Ecology 6: 407–488.
