= Dinah Abrahamson =

American author and politician

- Born: 1954; Omaha, Nebraska, United States
- Died: December 17, 2013 (aged 59); Brooklyn, New York, United States
- Occupation: Author/Nebraska State Central Committee Member
- Children: Sarah Abrahamson; Yosef Abrahamson
- Writing career
- Years active: 2011–2013
- Period: 2011–2013
- Genre: Race relations
- Website: theabrahamsonfamily.wordpress.com

Dinah Abrahamson (1954 – December 17, 2013) was an American author and politician. A native of Omaha, Nebraska, Abrahamson was a member of the Nebraska State Central Committee as well as an active member of the Republican Party. She was also known for her appearance on the Oprah Winfrey Network special on the lives of Hasidic Jews. Abrahamson and her family were most memorable for being one of few African-American families associated with the Chabad Lubavitch movement.

== Early life ==
Abrahamson was born in Omaha, Nebraska, in 1954, the daughter of immigrants. Her father was of Afro-Panamanian descent and her mother was of Ashkenazi Jewish descent from Germany. Raised by her mother and maternal grandparents, Abrahamson grew up in a secular Jewish household and would only attend synagogue on events within the Jewish community.

== Religious views ==
In 1993, Abrahamson and her two children joined the Hasidic Jewish dynasty, Chabad Lubavitch. After being raised in a secular household, Abrahamson became religious as she grew older and got to know herself better. The Abrahamsons were one of few Hasidic families, let alone black Hasidic families, in the Omaha area.

Her daughter Sarah eventually moved to Brooklyn, New York to work at a Hasidic Jewish day school. Shortly afterwards, Abrahamson and her son Yosef joined Sarah in New York City in order to be closer to a larger Jewish community. The family ultimately settled in Crown Heights, a neighborhood known for both its large African-American and Hasidic Jewish communities who live side by side in the area.

== Politics ==
Abrahamson was an active member of the Republican Party. She was a member of the Nebraska State Central Committee, as well as a supporter of Nebraska politician Lee Terry, who was a family friend of Abrahamson.

== Writing ==
At the time of her death, Abrahamson had self-published a book on race relations in America.

== Death ==
Abrahamson died on December 17, 2013. She was survived by her children, her sister and a granddaughter.
