= World Drug-Free Powerlifting Federation =

International sports organization

The World Drug-Free Powerlifting Federation (WDFPF) is an international powerlifting federation, founded in 1988, with 22 member countries. Its current president is Wim Backelant.

The federation is created specifically as a drug-free alternative international platform in order to provide fair competition world-wide for those powerlifters who wish to train and compete without performance-enhancing drugs. WDFPF has adopted rigorous drug control procedures, which is also applied to all national organizations affiliated to the WDFPF, as a pre-condition of their registration with the world body.

== Competition types ==
The WDFPF offers both equipped and unequipped lifting. In the equipped division single ply bench shirts are allowed in polyester or denim. Canvas and open backed shirts are not allowed. Single ply lifting suits are allowed in polyester. Canvas and denim are not allowed. Briefs are not legal. Knee wraps are fine up to 2m.

- Powerlifting - is a strength sport that consists of three attempts at maximal weight on three lifts: squat, bench press, and deadlift.
- Unequipped Competing or "RAW" - Allows limited equipment to only wrist wraps and a weightlifting belt. knee sleeves are considered equipped by the WDFPF
- Equipped Competing - Equipped lifters can wear a squat suit, knee wraps or sleeves, a bench shirt, and a deadlift suit. These four things are the things that separate equipped lifters and raw lifters.

== World Championship/World record holders ==
- Squat Unequipped Records
- Squat Equipped Records
- Bench Unequipped Records
- Bench Equipped
- Deadlift Unequipped Records
- Deadlift Equipped Records

== List of national affiliates ==
- Australia
- Belgium
- Canada
- Estonia
- France
- Germany
- Great Britain
- Ireland
- Italy
- Malta
- Moldova
- Russia
- Switzerland
- Turkmenistan
- Ukraine
- USA
