= Una Abrahamson =

British-born Canadian writer and artist

Una Stella Abrahamson
- Born: Una Stella Golding; August 6, 1922; Hackney, London, England
- Died: February 28, 1999 (aged 76); Toronto, Ontario, Canada
- Known for: Painter; Food nutritionist
- Spouse: Roy Abrahamson (m. 1945)

Una Stella Abrahamson (née Golding; August 6, 1922 – February 28, 1999) was an English-born Canadian artist and writer.

== Biography ==
She was born Una Stella Golding in East London and studied art in England. She married Roy Abrahamson shortly after World War II ended in 1945 and came to Canada the next year. She apprenticed as a painter with Henri Masson. She later worked as an economist and as domestic historian for the test kitchens at Chatelaine magazine. She was a publicist for the kitchens of General Foods and later as director of Consumer Affairs for the Dominion chain of supermarkets.

In 1975, Abrahamson was chair of the Ontario Council of Health's task force on dietetics and nutrition. In October 1976, she was hit by a car in Toronto. After staying in a coma for over a year and going through a subsequent long recovery period, she regained the ability to speak and write. She died in 1999 in Toronto at the age of 76.

== Legacy ==
She was the author of God Bless Our Home: Domestic Life in Nineteenth Century Canada (1966), The Canadian Guide to Home Entertaining (1974) and Crafts Canada (1975).

The large collection of cookbooks that she accumulated over her life were donated to the University of Guelph as the Una Abrahamson Canadian Cookery Collection.
