= Jakob Abrahamson =

Swedish poet

Jakob Abrahamson is a Swedish poet. His three poetry collections are published by the publishing house Ristaros in Täby, which only have published two other titles. Possibly, the name Jakob Abrahamson is a pseudonym for Svante Erhardson (born 1933).

== Bibliography ==
- 2004 - Vår dotter sopsorterar : 2001-2002 : dikter annars nästan helt utan kärlek och sådant ISBN 91-631-4892-7
- 2005 - När Sverige fick Norge och Danmark Sören : 2000-talet : dikter och stapelessäer för läsare över sjuttio ISBN 91-975577-0-6
- 2006 - Säga vad man vill om EU och det gör man ju : rimmad vers och stapelprosa för pensionärer ISBN 91-975577-2-2
