= Warren Abrahamson =

American biologist

- Scientific career
- Fields: Biology
- Institutions: Bucknell University (1973–2012)

Warren G. Abrahamson is an American biologist. He is Professor of Biology Emeritus at Bucknell University. He retired in 2012, having begun at the college as a teacher and researcher in 1973.

== Early life and career ==
Abrahamson, who was born to Warren and Alice Abrahamson, graduated from the University of Michigan.

In 1972, he was awarded the Lindback Award for Distinguished Teaching. A decade later, he was awarded The Class of 1956 Lectureship Award. In 1984, he was awarded the National Audubon Society's William Dutcher Award for Outstanding Service to the Audubon Cause at the Regional Level (Mid-Atlantic Region).

He was elected a Fellow of the American Association for the Advancement of Science in 2008.

=== Bucknell Greenhouse ===
Around 1990, Abrahamson helped design the Bucknell Biology Greenhouse during the department's relocation from the Botany Building. He created a self-guiding tour for the greenhouse, which is located on the fourth floor of the Robert L. Rooke Science Center. Julia Knickerbocker was the greenhouse's caretaker at the Botany Building. She was succeeded by Dr. Mark Spiro, who is now Associate Professor of Biology and Bucknell Farm's director. Tasha Hall has held the role since 2022.

Upon Abrahamson's retirement in 2012, Dr. Chris Martine succeeded him.

== Personal life ==
Abrahamson is married to Chris, with whom he lives on Shamokin Mountain, near Lewisburg, Pennsylvania. Their daughter, Jill, died in 2017, aged 44.
