= Emmy Abrahamson =

Swedish author (born 1976)

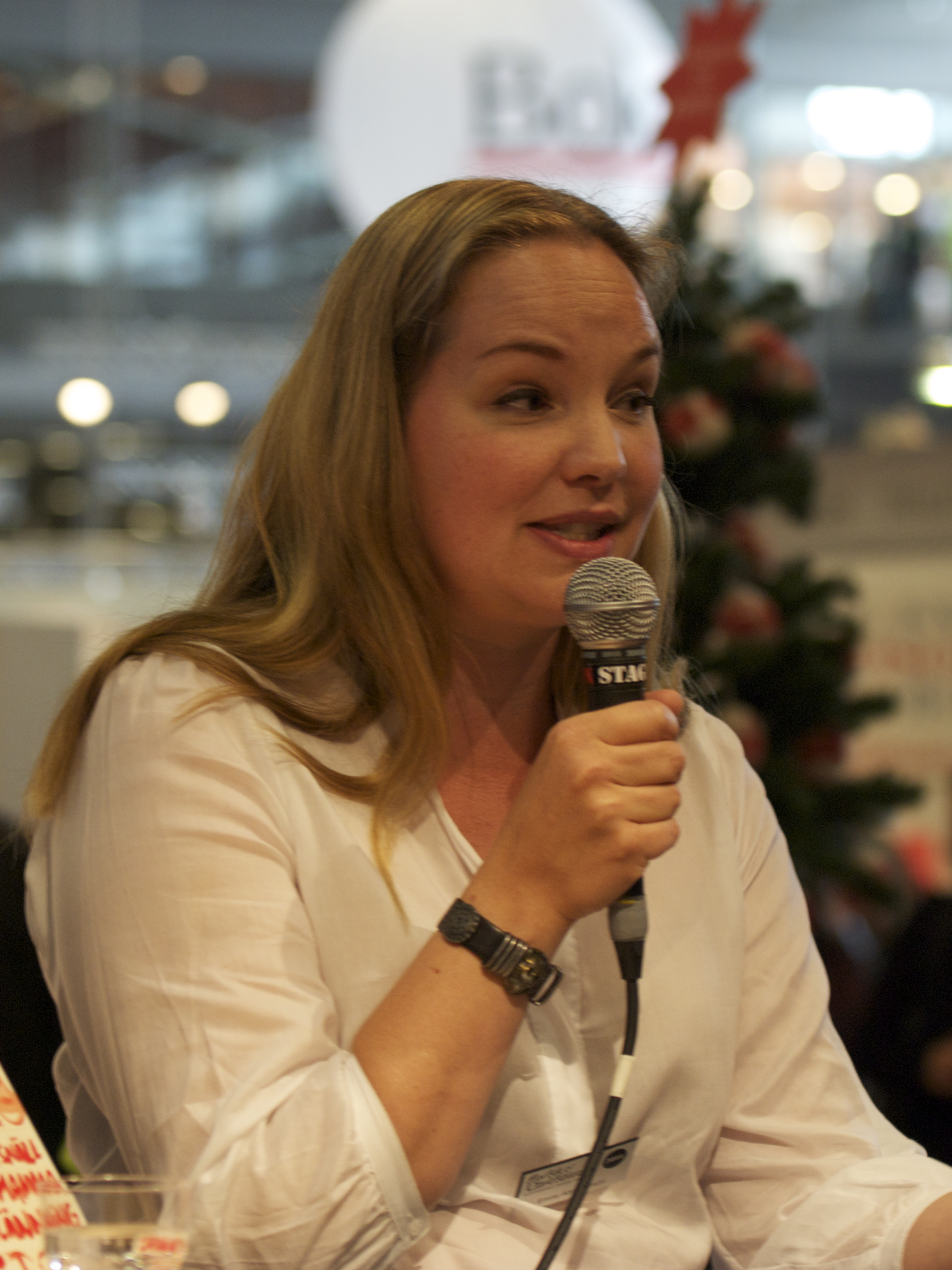
- Abrahamsson in 2011
- Born: 1976 (age 49–50)
- Occupation: Author

Emmy Abrahamson (born 1976) is a Swedish author and former actress. Abrahamson grew up in Moscow, then studied drama in London, worked as an actor in Amsterdam then as a director and artistic director in Vienna. In 2009, she returned to live again in Sweden.

Her literary debut was in 2011. The following year, she had a book nominated for a Prize in the category for children's and young adult literature.

According to Emmy, she met her husband, Vic Kocula, during her stay in Amsterdam. Vic was then a homeless man, who followed her back to Vienna. She wrote a book about the experience, How to fall in love with a man who lives in a bush. They have two children.
