= USA Weightlifting =

Sports governing body

USA Weightlifting, otherwise known as USAW, is the national governing body overseeing the sport of weightlifting in the United States. USAW is a member of the United States Olympic Committee (USOC), responsible for conducting weightlifting programs throughout the country, and a member of the International Weightlifting Federation (IWF). Top competitors are selected by USAW to compete in major international events such as the Olympic Games, World Championships, World Junior Championships, Pan American Championships and Pan American Games.

There are 45 state oriented Local Weightlifting Committees (LWC's). Each LWC promotes weightlifting programs and develops athletes in its region by holding local competitions and other programs. To compete in any USA Weightlifting sanctioned events, an athlete must be a current member of USAW. All athletes participating in USA Weightlifting activities may be subject to random drug testing, conducted via either the US Anti-Doping Agency (USADA) or the World Anti-Doping Agency (WADA).

USA Weightlifting authorizes five National Championships in all age groups, giving athletes a chance to evaluate their competition nationwide. Top competitors are selected from the various National Championships to compete in major international events.

The CEO oversees the USA Weightlifting National Office, which is located at the U.S. Olympic Training Center in Colorado Springs, Colorado. The CEO coordinates affairs with the US Olympic Committee (USOC), oversees national competitions and team selections, and supervises sponsorship and fundraising activities.

== National events ==
=== National Championships ===
The USA Weightlifting National Championships is the pinnacle Olympic weightlifting competition held in the United States. Open to registered USAW athletes (US citizens only) of all ages that reach the qualifying total in their weight class.

=== American Open ===
Open to registered USAW athletes of all ages that reach the qualifying total in their weight class.

=== National Collegiate Championships ===
Open to registered USAW athletes (US citizenship not required) currently registered at accredited colleges throughout the United States, who reach the qualifying total in their weight class. Athletes competing at the National Collegiate Championships cannot be younger than 15 or older than 28, as of December 31 of the year in which they are competing at this event.

=== National Junior Championships ===
Open to registered USAW athletes (US citizens only) that reach the qualifying total in their weight class. Athletes competing at the National Juniors cannot be younger than 18 or older than 20, as of December 31 of the year in which they are competing at this event.

=== National School Age Championships ===
Open to registered USAW athletes (US citizens only) that reach the qualifying total in their weight class. Athletes competing at the National School Age Championships cannot be older than 17 years old, as of December 31 of the year in which they are competing at this event.

=== Olympic trials ===
The USA Weightlifting Olympic Trials are by invitation only, according to athlete ranking and other factors. Anyone hoping to compete at the Olympic Trials must request to be in the Registered Drug Testing Pool at least one year prior to the first Olympic Trials qualifying event.

== Coaches ==
=== Club Coach (Level 1) ===
The Club Coach course is aimed at beginning coaches who will be working with competing weightlifters and who want to learn the basics of the Olympic lifts. Material learned covers the foundation of the snatch and the clean and jerk. Progression coaching is used as the tool for teaching the lifts, including push press, overhead squat, muscle lifts, and others.

=== Senior Coach (Level 2) ===
This is the second formalized education course within USA Weightlifting's Coaching Education curriculum. The course accommodates the needs of coaches who have already qualified as Club Coaches. The facilitation of this course is over four days and may take place at USAW Headquarters, the Olympic Training Center in Colorado Springs or at a club location.

The aim of this course is at the developing Club Coach graduate who has progressed beyond coaching beginners. The course offers an expanding education for the coach, introducing many Sports Science elements. Instructors will provide candidates with a body of knowledge and practical expertise so that they can develop their lifters from Club standard to National standard and beyond. More emphasis is on programming of training and preparing athletes to compete on the international platform. A more comprehensive biomechanics chapter is included and a number of new topics are introduced such as anatomy, physiology, kinesiology, nutrition, strength and power principles and general physical preparation.

=== Regional Coach (Level 3) ===
This is the final formalized education course within USA Weightlifting's Coaching Education curriculum. The course caters to the needs of coaches who have already qualified as Club and Senior Coaches.

The main thrust and aim of the course is to progress the Senior Coach Graduate, who is by now, hopefully, coaching and developing national standard lifters, to a point where he/she can develop his/her lifters into international class competitors. The course will also prepare the coach to handle team coaching at international events.

The course is very open-ended and designed to provide the most up-to-date information on a variety of topics. The provision of this information will stimulate the candidates to develop their own coaching philosophies within USAW guidelines. Looking at the sport on an "international" rather than a national context should aid in this endeavor.

=== Sports Performance Coach ===
The Sports Performance Coach course focuses on the utilization and application of the Olympic lifts and their assistance exercises, plyometrics and medicine ball training to the realm of sport specific training, power development and injury prevention. The course is appropriate for high school, college and professional sports coaches who work with athletes from other sports besides weightlifting, such as football, track and field, wrestling, etc. It is also appropriate for personal trainers who work with private clients, incorporating weightlifting into their personal fitness routines. There are no prerequisites to take this course.

=== Advanced Sports Performance Coach ===
The Advanced Sports Performance Coach course is a secondary course to the standard Sports Performance Coaching Course. The course is aimed at coaches who would like advanced knowledge in hopes of bettering themselves and their athletes.
