= Majdi =

Majdy and Majdi or Mejdi or Egyptian variants Magdi or Magdy (in Arabic مجدي) is an Arabic masculine given name and surname of Arabic origin. Notable people with the name include:

== Given name ==
=== Magdi ===
- Magdi Abdelghani (born 1959), former Egyptian footballer, who played as an attacking midfielder
- Magdi Abdelhadi, Egyptian-British freelance writer
- Magdi Allam (born 1952), Egyptian-born Italian journalist and political leader, noted for his criticism of Islamic Extremism
- Magdi Amin (born 1966), Sudanese-American economist and venture capitalist
- Magdi El-Gabri (1961–1999), Egyptian poet and researcher
- Magdi El Galad (born 1964), Egyptian journalist
- Magdi Khalil, Egyptian-American political analyst, researcher, author, and executive editor
- Magdi Mehanna (1956–2008), Egyptian journalist
- Magdi Qorqor, Egyptian journalist
- Magdi Saad (1954–2011), Egyptian squash player and coach
- Magdi Wahba (1925–1991), Egyptian university professor, Johnsonian scholar, and lexicographer
- Magdi Yacoub, (born 1935), Professor of Cardiothoracic Surgery at Imperial College London
- Magdi Youssef (born 1936), Egyptian professor

=== Magdy ===
- Magdy Ahmed Abdullah (born 1966), Egyptian field hockey player
- Magdy Ahmed Ali (born 1952), Egyptian director, actor, and screenwriter
- Magdy Ashour, Egyptian activist
- Magdy Atwa (born 1983), Egyptian football midfielder
- Magdy Conyd (1939–2023), Canadian fencer
- Magdy Abdel Ghaffar (born 1952), Egyptian politician
- Magdy Gheriani (born 1931), Egyptian gymnast
- Magdy Hatata (born 1941), retired Egyptian military officer
- Magdy Fouad Hegazy (born 1953), Egyptian politician
- Magdy Ishak (born 1947), orthopedic surgeon, President of the Egyptian Medical Society UK
- Magdy Abou El-Magd (born 1972), Egyptian handball player
- Magdy Galal Sharawi (born 1946), retired senior Egyptian Air Force officer
- Magdy Tolba (born 1964), former Egyptian international midfielder
- Magdy Younes (born 1939), Canadian physician and researcher

=== Majdi ===
- Majdi Allawi (born 1970), Lebanese Maronite priest
- Majdi Al-Attar (born 1995), Jordanian footballer
- Majdi Halabi (1985–2005), Israeli Druze soldier who disappeared on duty near Haifa
- Majdi Khaldi (born 1961), Palestinian diplomat and ambassador
- Majdi Mosrati (born 1986), Tunisian footballer
- Majdi Nema (born 1988), Syrian media figure, politician, and convicted war criminal
- Majdi al-Saleh (born 1963), Palestinian politician and civil engineer
- Majdi Siddiq (born 1985), Qatari footballer of Sudanese descent
- Majdi Smiri (born 1983), Tunisian filmmaker
- Majdi Toumi (born 1975), Tunisian volleyball player

=== Mejdi ===
- Mejdi Kaabi (born 1982), Tunisian chess player
- Mejdi Schalck (born 2004), French rock climber
- Mejdi Traoui (born 1983), Tunisian football player

== Surname ==
=== Magdy ===
- Ahmed Magdy (actor) (born 1986), Egyptian-Algerian actor and director
- Ahmed Magdy (footballer, born 1986), Egyptian football defender
- Ahmed Magdy (footballer, born 1989), Egyptian football right wing back

=== Majdi ===
- Aya Majdi (born 1994), Egyptian born Qatari table tennis player
- Muhammad Zainul Majdi (born 1972), Indonesian politician and governor

== See also ==
- Majdy, a village in the administrative district of Gmina Stawiguda, within Olsztyn County, Warmian-Masurian Voivodeship, in northern Poland
- Mejdi Tours
