= Lina Attalah =

Egyptian journalist

- لينا عطاالله
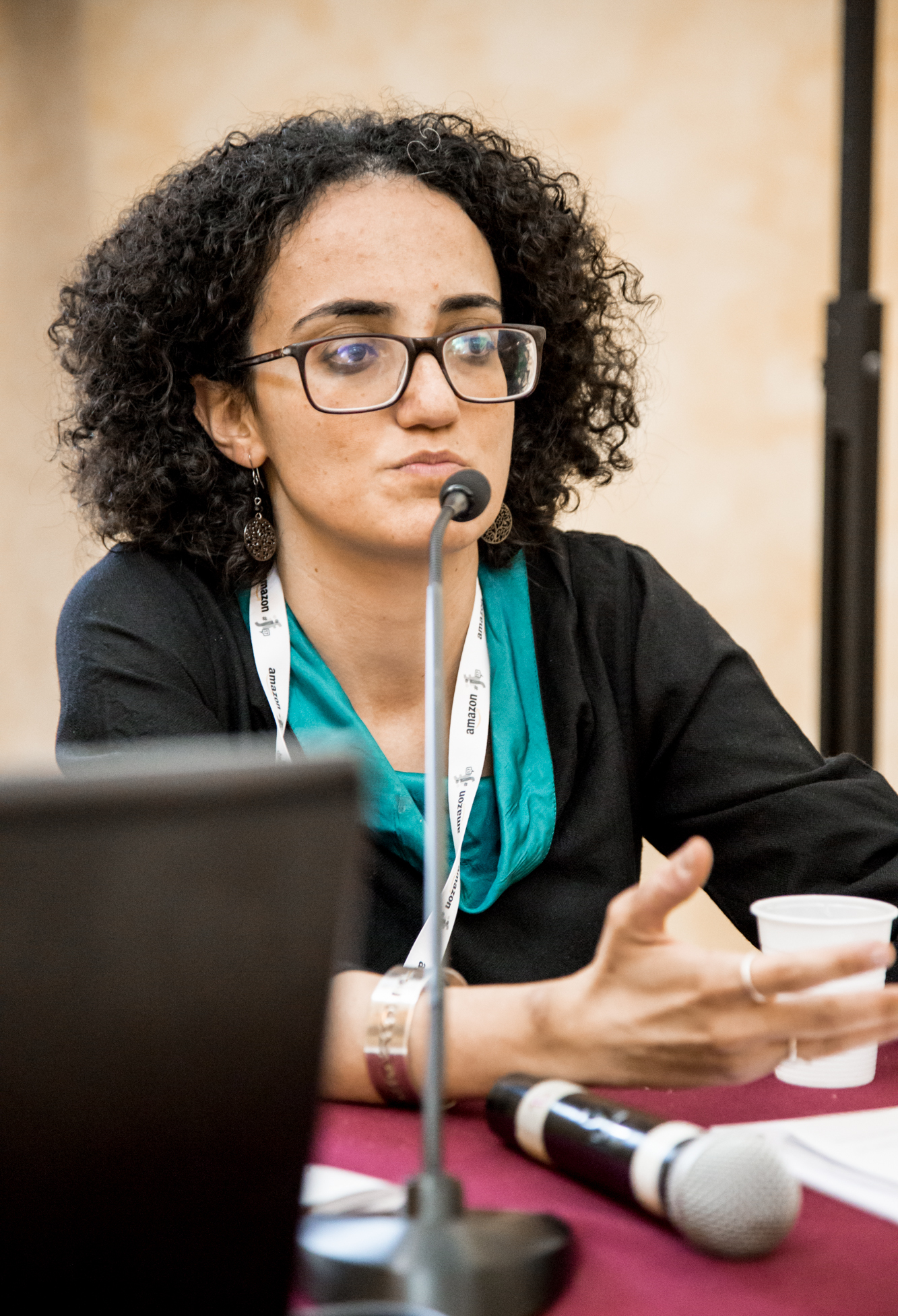
- Born: c. 1983
- Education: American University in Cairo
- Occupations: Journalist, activist, journalist
- Employers: Egypt Independent; Mada Masr

Lina Attalah (Arabic: لينا عطاالله; born c. 1983) is an Egyptian media figure and journalist. Attalah is co-founder and chief editor of Mada Masr, an independent online Egyptian newspaper and was previously managing editor of the Egypt Independent prior to its print edition closure in 2013. She is active in the fight against the restriction of honest journalism. Time recognized her as a "New Generation Leader", calling her the "Muckraker of the Arab World" in 2018, and including her in Time's 100 Most Influential People of 2020.

in 2020 she was awarded the Knight International Journalism Award from the International Center for Journalists.

== Education ==
Attalah is an alumna of the United World College of the Adriatic in Duino, Italy. She then studied journalism at the American University in Cairo.

== Journalism ==
Attalah's journalism has covered notable events in the Egyptian world, including the 2011 Egyptian revolution. She has published articles in Al-Masry Al-Youm, Cairo Times, The Daily Star and the Christian Science Monitor and for the Thomson Reuters news agency. She worked as a radio producer and campaign coordinator for BBC World Service Trust in 2005.

Attalah was managing editor of the Egypt Independent prior to the closure of its print edition in 2013. She is co-founder and the first chief editor of Mada Masr, an independent online Egyptian newspaper.

=== Repression ===
In 2011, Attalah was among journalists who were attacked by security forces while covering a demonstration in Cairo.

In November 2019, Attalah was briefly detained by Egyptian security services after Mada Masr, of which she is chief editor, published an article about plans for president Abdel Fattah el-Sisi's son Mahmoud el-Sisi to be transferred from the General Intelligence Directorate (GIS), one of the three Egyptian intelligence services, to the Military Intelligence agency and assigned to a diplomatic position in Moscow in 2020 in response to Mahmoud's media visibility having a negative impact on president el-Sisi's image. Mada Masr member Shady Zalat was detained for a day and a half, laptops and telephones from the Mada Masr office were confiscated, and Mada Masr staff, free lancers and guests were held incommunicado in the office for several hours by security forces.

On 18 May 2020, in what was described as a "growing crackdown on freedom of expression linked to Covid-19," Attalah was arrested outside Tora prison in Cairo while interviewing the sister of detained journalist Alaa Abd El-Fattah.

==== 2026 trial and sentencing ====
On 22 October 2026, Attalah was questioned and referred to trial on a charge of establishing and managing a website without a license. The court date was set for 27 October. Mada Masr said it had been applying for a license since 2018, with its latest application pending since 2023.

At the hearing on 27 October 2026, all observers except Hossam Bahgat of the Egyptian Initiative for Personal Rights were barred from the courtroom. Judge Mohammed Mubarak announced that he would replace Attalah's lawyer with a lawyer of his own appointment. According to Bahgat, "the judge proceeded to dictate motions on behalf of this lawyer—who had not uttered a single word—and entered them into the official record". Bahgat said Attalah's objection to the lawyer's appointment was not entered into the record.

Attalah was convicted and given the maximum penalty of a E£3 million (US$53,500) fine, and informed of a yearlong prison sentence issued against her in 2024.

== Public speaker ==
Attalah is a frequent public speaker and has been invited to address UNESCO's World Press Freedom Day, Storyful in Australia, the Arab Media Forum, and a host of other events.

== Online media ==
Attalah is active in online social media. She had more than 50 thousand followers on Twitter in 2022.

== Recognition ==
Attalah was awarded the 2020 Knight International Journalism Award from the International Center for Journalists. Attalah was one of Time's 100 most influential people of 2020.

Attallah was awarded Ordre des Arts et des Lettres with a Knight degree by the French embassy in Cairo in 2022

== Personal life ==
Attalah is a Christian.

== See also ==
- Lists of Egyptians
