= Ma3looma =

Ma3looma is an Egyptian website aimed to raise awareness about sexual and reproductive health (SRH) issues among the Egyptian youth. The website addresses the current problem that Egyptian youth/students are insufficiently educated about SRH issues due to their relatives/teachers being embarrassed or unprepared to discuss this issue due to social taboos. Ma3looma uses various social media platforms as well as its own website to expose at-risk populations and the Egyptian youth coming to age in a digital era “… to anonymous, accurate, and non-judgmental information about their health and rights using OneWorld’s mobile phone and web-based question-and-answer service, which is managed and staffed by trained counselors from the Egyptian Family Health Service (EFHS).” Ma3looma is operating via Facebook, Twitter, and YouTube.

Ma3looma is funded by the Ford Foundation and is a project within One World's Mobile4Good portfolio.

== Historical context ==
There is a danger of inattention to HIV/AIDS that lurks within the countries of the Middle East and North Africa, specifically Egypt, that could lead to a repeat of situations seen in “Indonesia, Africa or China where initial disregard or delayed reaction has ended in large number of orphans, a shortage of workers and huge health expenditures to care for HIV/AIDS patients.” Young people worldwide are considered an ‘at-risk’ population due to participation in risky behaviors such as taking drugs, experimenting sexually, and failing to use condoms. Sexual education is a necessity among youth worldwide and Egyptian youth is no exception.

In Egypt, adolescent SRH education is controversial and is opposed by some parents, religious and community leaders, policymakers, service providers, and young people due to social taboos and the belief that these issues are too embarrassing to discuss in public. The lack of continuity within the society leads to school-based or home-based SRH education to be insufficient in either the amount of information and/or the accuracy of that information. This obviously creates a challenge for young Egyptians, aged 10–29 who compose 40 percent of the Egyptian population, to attain important and accurate SRH information to stay healthy and safe.

Enter Ma3looma which means "a piece of information," in Arabic. This website uses various social media platforms as well as its own website to expose at-risk populations and the Egyptian youth coming to age in a digital era “… to anonymous, accurate, and non-judgmental information about their health and rights using OneWorld’s mobile phone and web-based question-and-answer service, which is managed and staffed by trained counselors from the Egyptian Family Health Service (EFHS).”

== Supported ==
Support from the website comes from "a collaborative network of actors, including OneWorld UK, the Egypt-based Centre for Development Services (CDS), which is responsible for the financial management of the project, the Egyptian Family Health Society (EFHS), which manages the mobile phone messaging service, as well as the UNFPA's Youth Peer Network (Y-PEER), Friends of Life (FoL), the Egyptian Initiative for Personal Rights (EIPR), and Qabila TV."
