= Hossam Fahr =

Egyptian writer and translator

- Born: Cairo, Egypt
- Education: University of Cairo (B.A.)
- Occupations: Writer, translator
- Awards: Won the Sawiris Foundation Award for his work "Amina's Tales" in 2009

Hossam Fahr (Arabic:حسام فخر), a writer and translator, was born in 1958. He has published four collections of short stories and two novels including "The Other Stories". He won the Sawiris Foundation Award in its fourth session for his collection of short stories "Amina's Tales" in 2009.

== Education and career ==
Hossam Fahr was born in Cairo, Egypt in 1958. He moved to New York City in 1982 and is currently residing there. His father is Major General Ahmed Fahr and his uncle is the Egyptian poet Salah Jahin. He is currently the Director of the translation Department at the United Nations Headquarters in New York. He graduated from Cairo University and earned a bachelor's degree in Political Science in 1979. His first short stories collections "The Rug is not Ahmadiyya" was published in 1985, and his second collection "The Mother of Feelings" was published in 1992. He has published four collections of short stories and two novels. His fourth short stories collection won the Sawiris Foundation Award in its fourth session in 2009. Although this collection consists of various different stories yet the character "Amina" is the center and common character in all the stories. In fact, Amina represents Fahr's grandmother "Amina", the mother of the Egyptian poet Salah Jahin, as he recounted his grandmother's stories and memories. His latest novel was "Tales of the Others", published in 2008, which takes place in the city of Al-Nahhas in Morocco, where the narrator of the novel travels to escape from his parents' grief over the death of his brother and his idea of killing them to save them from the pain of sadness, but he decided to go and never return again.

== Works ==
=== Short-stories collections ===
- The Rug is not Ahmadiyya (original title: Al Bisatu Laisa Ahmadiyan), 1985
- The Mother of Feelings (original title: Um al Shuur), 1992
- Faces of Newyork (original title: Wojooh New York), 2004
- Amina’s Tales (original title: Hikayaat Amina), 2007

=== Novels ===
- My Eyes’ Dear (original title: Ya Aziz Aini), 2006
- The “Other” Stories (original title: Hawadeeth al Akhar), 2008

== Awards ==
- He won the Sawiris Foundation Award in its fourth session for his collection of short stories "Amina’s Tales" in 2009.

== See also ==
- Abdel Nasser El-Gohary
- Amr El Adly
- Magdi El-Gabri
