= Magdi Youssef =

Egyptian academic

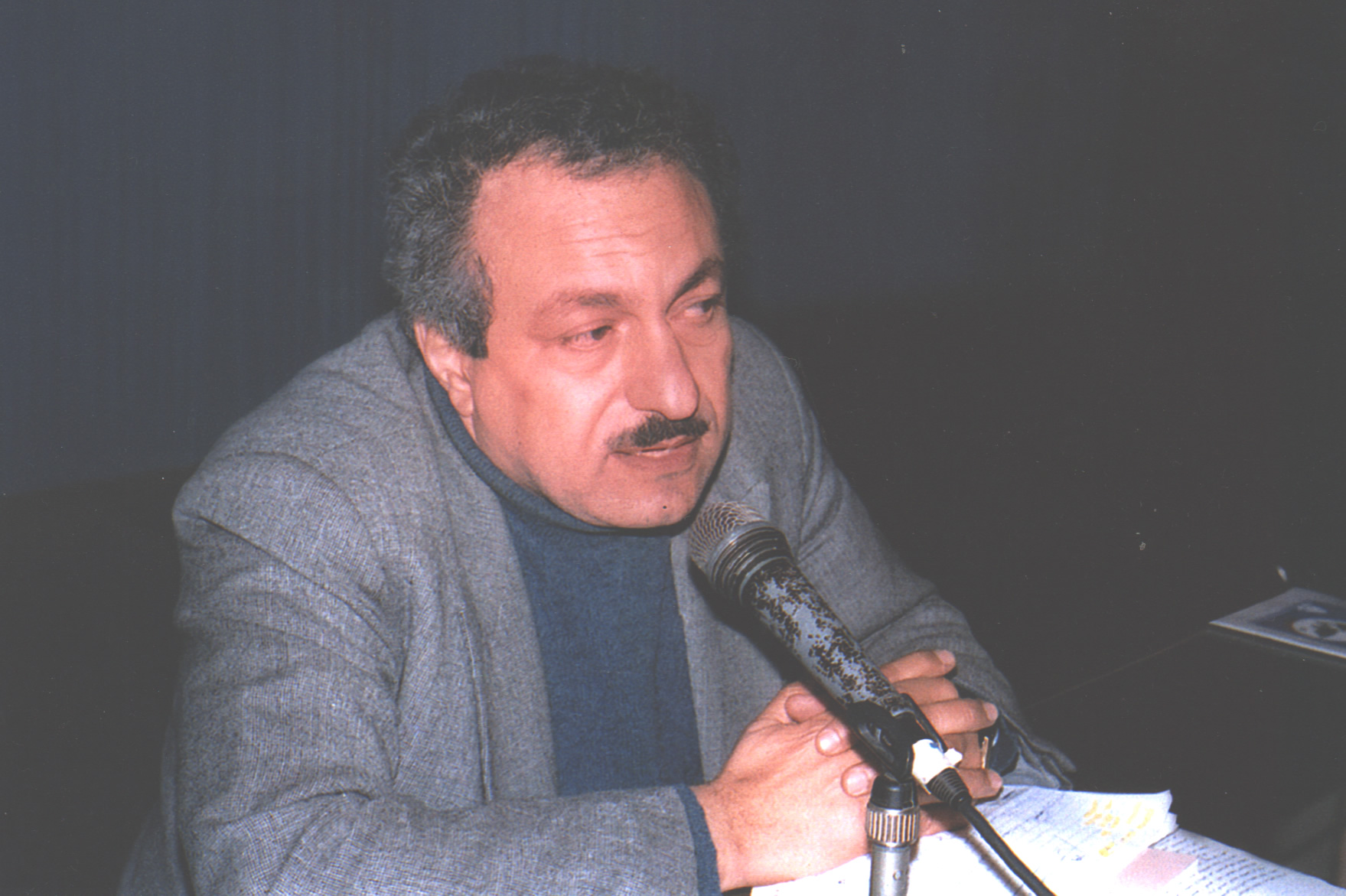
Magdi Youssef lecturing.

Magdi Youssef (born 22 July 1936) is an Egyptian professor of comparative literature and culture studies. He has taught at various universities in Europe and Egypt until his retirement. Al-Ahram (according to the Middle East Institute the equivalent of the New York Times in the Arab World) called Youssef “the renowned culture critic.” He is widely noted in the Arab world for his analytic interventions that focus on cultural alienation and unequal exchange in the sphere of culture. His book Critical Battles received wide attention. Youssef has contributed to the proceedings of comparative literature congresses in Latin America, Asia, Europe and the US., and to such journals as Al-Hilal, the International Journal of Middle East Studies (Cambridge Univ. Press) and Theatre Research International (Oxford Univ. Press). He is also the founding president of the International Association of Intercultural Studies (IAIS) and still actively involved in theoretical debates related to intercultural relations and comparative literature.

Youssef is a member of the Association pour l'avancement des études islamiques, Collège de France (Paris). He is also listed as a member of the International Sociological Association (ISA), L'Association Internationale des Sociologues de Langue Francaise, the International Brecht Society, based in the US, the Egyptian Association of Plastic Art Critics and the International Comparative Literature Association (ICLA). Magdi Youssef adheres to the Egyptian writers' union and the German Schriftstellerverband.

Outside academe, Youssef was widely noted as a critic of contemporary developments and a culture critic by such daily newspapers and weeklies as The Irish Times, Al-Masry Al-Youm, Al Qahira, Al-Ahram Daily, Al-Ahram Hebdo, Al-Ahram Weekly, as well as other media in the Arab World, Brazil, Canada, China, France, Germany, and the US.

== Early life and education ==
Magdi Youssef is a native of Cairo. After completing his social scientific studies at Ain Shams University in Cairo and pursuing advanced studies in Germany, he acquired in October 1975 the degree of Dr. rer. soc. from the Faculty of Social Sciences of Bochum University (recognized by the Supreme Council of Universities of Egypt as the equivalent of a Ph.D.). From 1963 till 1971, he collaborated with the German ‘orientalist’ Annemarie Schimmel, translating literary and philosophical texts and contributing to the periodical Fikrun wa Fann (Thought and Art) He has two children.

== Academic career ==
Youssef taught at German universities since 1965. After intensive debates with conventional Orientalists, he established and taught the hitherto contested subject of Modern and Contemporary Arabic Literature and Culture at Cologne University. Modern and Contemporary Arabic Literature had been widely ignored in German academe (which specialized in Classical Arabic and the Islamic Legacy). Youssef continued to teach this subject at Cologne University until 1971.

From October 1971–76, Youssef taught Modern Arabic Literature and Culture at the Department of Philology at Bochum University. Since then he has lectured on the Interactions between the Arab and Western Socio-Cultural Formations in Modern Times, at the Faculty of Social Sciences at Bochum University, at post-graduate level.

From 1979 to 1981, Youssef continued to commute between Bochum and Tanta, teaching Methodology of Research at the department of sociology and the department of philosophy at Tanta University (Egypt). He was Professor of Methodology of Research at the Academy of Arts in Cairo from 1983 to 1984. Until his retirement, Magdi Youssef was Professor of Comparative Literature and Drama Studies at the Faculty of Arts at Cairo University (from the mid-1980s-2005). From 1988 to 1991 he was simultaneously a visiting professor of Methodology of Research at the Faculty of Mass Communication at the same university. Youssef has also been a visiting professor at Trinity College Dublin. And he taught at Bonn University in the context of Gastprofessur. More recently, he has been offered a research fellowship at the Free University of Berlin (in 2014 and 2015).

=== Brecht in Egypt ===
In 1976 Youssef published a study on “Brecht in Egypt” that reveals his main methodological focus. In this study which elucidated the influence of spontaneous actor-public interaction in popular As Samir performances on advanced, Egyptified stagings of Brecht's plays, he already emphasized the active rather than passive aspect of reception as a socio-culturally ‘situated’ process that typically occurs in a context of specific interests, needs, etc. The value of this study was noted by Prof. Stéphane Santerres-Sarkany. Other scholars saw the study as very valuable, too, notably Martin Franzbach. The book was also praised by the Brecht scholar Reinhold Grimm. Grimm wrote that "Youssef's approach is highly enlightening, and in fact, exemplary for any future investigation of Brecht's influence in the Third World." Recognizing the relevance of Youssef's approach to modern theater, the Goethe Institute in Tunis invited Youssef in 1972 to deliver lectures about Brecht's theatre in the Arab World. At the time, his Arabic translation of Brecht's play "Der Jasager und der Neinsager" was performed in the Tunisian province Al-Kaf; it was directed by Monsef Al-Souissi. Due to Youssef's continuous focus on the theater as an effective medium of socio-cultural interaction, he was invited to address the Colloquium organized in the context of the international theater festival in Carthage, Tunisia, in 1995. On this occasion, he was also a member of the jury of the Festival International de Carthage.

For many years, Youssef has been engaged in testing his methodological approach, re-formulating it where necessary. Intercultural studies and comparative literature research have never been a purely literary concern for him. He situated both in social and political contexts. As Peter Horwath mentions, it was enlightening that Youssef critically discussed “[e]conomic and cultural contacts between Arab and European nations during the modern era” (p. 129) at the XVth Triennial Congress of the Fédération Internationale des Langues et littératures modernes. That he saw the link between economics and culture was not accidental.

An editorial commentary in the Proceedings of the Tenth Congress of the ICLA (published in 1985) asserted that “references to neo-Marxist explanations and ideological analysis” could be found in the paper that Youssef presented at this Congress. Whether this label suggested by either D. W. Fokkema or E. C. Smith or both is appropriate, is subject to further debate. Other, more careful commentators defined Youssef as a sharp critic of “Eurocentrism” (respectively “West[ern]-Centrism”).

Youssef described himself as “a theorist of intercultural studies” who is mainly interested in analyzing the interaction between “modern and contemporary Arab vs Western socio-cultural formations. […] His publications […] deal with the study of the mechanisms of socio-cultural relations between different societal formations.”

In the late 1990s, a critical study entitled “The Myth of European Literature” caught the attention of such scholars as Franca Sinopoli, Armando Gnisci and Peter Caravetta. Caravetta noted especially Youssef's epistemological critique of Edward Said: Because of Said's indebtedness to Auerbach and Curtius, Youssef found his critique of orientalism ambivalent. According to Caravetta, Youssef critiqued the fact that Edward Said, very much like Auerbach and Curtius, could not help but comprehend ‘realism’ as an ‘intra-literary’ phenomenon. Youssef held that literature, in so far as it is a human product, and in so far as it works or functions in an interactive way, is a process which takes place inside society, however.

Armando Gnisci saw in Youssef's Myth of European Literature an important theoretical contribution to a “poetics of decolonization” that challenges dominant Western literary concepts of literature and the Western literary canon.

Youssef's reflections on Arab Comparative and General Literature were widely noted and they were accorded a considerable reception, as they appeared in English, in Italian, and in Irish. Likewise, a summary of his research and his methodological considerations with regard to “Literary and Social Transformations” (pertaining to the relationship of European and Arabic Literatures) were noted also outside the English-speaking world. And so was his analysis concerning the (lacking) balance of translation from Western into Non-Western languages and conversely, from languages rooted in the so-called Third World into English and other main languages of the Northern hemisphere.

=== From Sociocultural Interference to Cross-cultural Interaction ===
In 2001, the critic Mahmoud El-Wardani called Youssef's new book From Sociocultural Interference to Cross-cultural Interaction [M. Youssef, Min Al-Tadakhul ila Al-Tafa'ul Al-Hadari. Al-Hilal Book, Dar Al-Hilal, 2001] a “valuable book” that “deals with the challenges globalization posits for Third World countries. The main concern of the book is how people of the Third World could be not merely consumers of knowledge but also producers. It is divided into three sections; the first dealing with theoretical approaches to the dialectics of the self and the other in the present time, the second attempts an application of the theory elaborated in the first section on selected works of literature and art. The final section engages in critical debates with a number of well-known figures in Arab culture.”

As an article in Al-Ahram Weekly notes, “Youssef describes his life's work as a single, protracted attempt at establishing, in the Western academic mentality, the existence of a contemporary Arab culture -- in the widest sense of the word. And it is on the vitality, creativity and "objective difference" of such a culture, he insists, that every successful step on the way to demystifying Orientalist preconceptions about the Arab world has depended.”

Al-Ahram Weekly repeatedly noted Youssef's critique of the hegemony of Western media, including televised and printed cartoons of the Walt Disney type. In this context, Youssef's essay “Arab Fairy-Tales in Disney-Times” deserved attention.

According to Youssef, “the West's subtle psychological barriers complicate the process of intercultural exchange," a staff writer of Al Ahram Weekly noted.

Youssef was also rather critical of the cultural bureaucracy of the Mubarak regime and of the Arab League's cultural bureaucracies when the Arab World was Guest of Honor at the International Frankfurt Book Fair in 2004. He has generally been critical of dictatorships, including that of Mubarak. His commitment to democracy motivates him to comment regularly on the state of affairs in Egypt in the Arab version of the Egypt Independent, i.e. in Al-Masry Al-Youm. Some of his articles in Al-Masry al-Youm aroused controversies in the Arab-Egyptian media, for instance in the weekly journal al-Qahira. Here, one of the most renowned Egyptian and Arab columnists, al-Sayed Yasin, commented for instance on Oct. 9, 2012 in his weekly column entitled Meditations on M. Youssef's article What is Reading and What is Illiteracy? (published in Al-Masry al-Youm, Sept. 28, 2012). Al-Masry al-Youm refers to him (in Arabic) as “Magdi Youssef · Top Commenter · Professor of Comparative Literature and Methodology of Research at Cairo University.”

According to an interviewer, one of his goals as a scholar is to “help place Arab culture on an equal footing with the West.”

Reflecting on the shortcomings of the Arab League’s cultural program during the 2004 Frankfurt Book fair, “comparative literature professor Magdi Youssef's, stress[ed] scholarly issues” – most notably “the programme's failure to take account of Arab achievements in the natural sciences, an omission that [in Youssef’s view] confirms the [false] notion that Arabs have made no contribution to material knowledge for centuries.”

The Congress of the IAIS in 2009 (organized by Youssef) that took place at the UNESCO headquarters in Paris has sought to correct this perception, as scholars from various disciplines, both from the West and the Arab world, evaluated the Arab contribution to “world culture” in a wide range of fields that include the natural and social sciences as well as literature and the arts (e.g. the architecture of Rasem Badran and of the late Hassan Fathi).

== Editorial activities ==
Youssef is listed as an adviser to the editorial board of Sotour (a monthly literary and cultural review based in Cairo and London). He is also an adviser to the editorial board of the Yearbook of Comparative Literature (published by Cairo University). He is currently the general editor of the book series: Towards a Really Rational World Culture, published by Cambridge Scholars Publishing in the U.K. This series aim at presenting the contributions of the so far marginalized socio-cultures to World Culture thus to make for a real cultural exchange worldwide, instead of the prevailing one-sided globalized Western 'World culture'.

== Selected books and articles ==
- Magdi Youssef, Brecht in Aegypten: Versuch einer literatursoziologischen Deutung, Bochum (Brockmeyer Universitaetsverlag) 1976. [Brecht's Theater in Egypt: A Socio-literary Interpretation.]
- Magdi Youssef, The Socio-Cultural Interaction Processes between the Arab World and the West in Modern Times, in: Intercultural Studies, Bochum, 1983, pp. 11–47.
- Magdi Youssef (Bochum), “Sociology of the Emergence and Development of European Forms of Theatre in Modern Arabic Literatures,” in: Actes du VIIIe Congrès de L'Association Internationale de Littérature Comparée: Littératures de diverses cultures au vingtième siècle. (International Comparative Literature Association. Congress), ed. by Béla Köpeczi, György Mihály Vajda – 1980, pp. 207ff.
- Magdi Youssef, al-Tadakhul al-Hadari wa'l Istiqlal al-Fikri (Socio-Cultural Interference and Intellectual Independence), Cairo 1993. (In Arabic).
- Magdi Youssef, “Brecht’s Theatre and Social Change in Egypt (1954-71),” in: Bulletin of the Faculty of Arts, Cairo University Press, No. 63, May 1994, pp. 59–73. Republished in the first issue of:www.arabstages.org
- Magdi Youssef, “Towards a Multi-Centric Literary Canon: The Arab Contribution, in: Language and Literature Today”, in: Proceedings of the 19th Triennial Congress of the International Federation for Modern Languages and Literatures, pp. 496–498 (abstract), in: Language and literature today: proceedings of the XIXth triennial congress of the International Federation for Modern Languages and Literatures; interdisciplinary approaches to language and literature. Languages and literature in the "global village". (Universidade de Brasília) 1996
- Magdi Youssef, The Myth of European Literature (extended version), Aachen-Rotterdam (Symposium Press) 1998.
- Magdi Youssef, “Towards a Real Decentralization of the Literary Canon: The Arab Contribution,” in: Horwath, Peter; Hendrickson, William L; Valdivieso, L. Teresa; Thor, Eric P. (eds): Humanism and the Good Life, Proceedings of the Fifteenth Congress of the World Federation of Humanists, New York (Peter Lang) 1998, pp. 381–389.
- Magdi Youssef, Min al-Tadakhul ila at-Tafa'ul al-Hadari(From Socio-Cultural Interference to Cross-Cultural Interaction), Cairo (Kitab al-Hilal) 2001. (In Arabic).
- Magdi Youssef, Ma'arik Naqdiyya (Critical Debates), Cairo 2007. 2nd edition.(In Arabic).
- Magdi Youssef, “From A Philological To A Social-Scientific Approach With Regard To Comparative Literary Research”, in: Coutinho, Eduardo F. (ed.): Beyond Binarisms. Proceedings of the 18th International Comparative Literature Association (ICLA) [Conference, held in Rio de Janeiro 2007], Rio de Janeiro 2009.
- Magdi Youssef, " Decolonizing World Literature", in: D'haen, Theo, Jannis Goerland and Roger Sell (eds.): Major versus Minor ?- Languages and Literature in a Globalized World. John Benjamin's Publishing Company: Amsterdam and Philadelphia, 2015, pp. 125–140.
- Magdi Youssef, As'ilat al-Manhag al-Naqid ( Questions of a Critical Methodology/Epistemology ), Cairo, 2016, pp 378.
- Magdi Youssef, (ed.and co-author), The Contemporary Arab Contribution To World Culture: An Arab-Western Dialogue, Cambridge Scholars Publishing, 2018, pp. 225.
