= Aziz Abu Sarah =

Palestinian peace activist, journalist, and politician

- عزيز أبو سارة
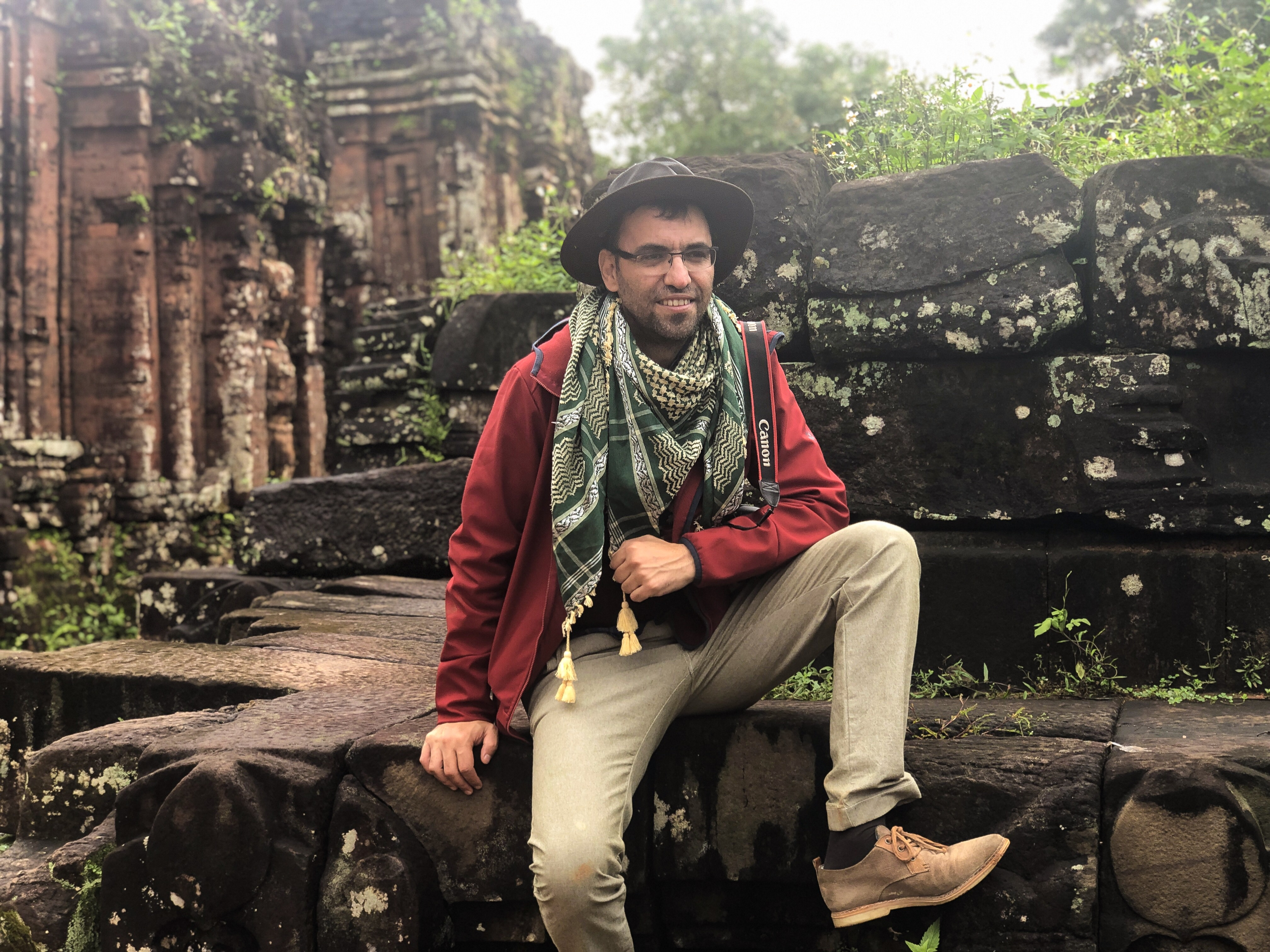
- Born: 1980 (age 45–46) al-Eizariya, Jerusalem
- Occupations: Tour operator; Journalist
- Employers: All for Peace; National Geographic; Mejdi Tours
- Organizations: The Parents Circle-Families Forum; Center for World Religions, Diplomacy and Conflict Resolution
- Known for: Peace activism; International conflict resolution; Founder of Mejdi Tours

Aziz Abu Sarah (Arabic: عزيز أبو سارة, Hebrew: עזיז אבו סארה; born 1980) is a Palestinian peace activist, journalist, social entrepreneur and politician.

After watching his brother die of internal injuries subsequent to being released from an Israeli jail following a year-long detention for stone throwing, Abu Sarah first turned to anti-Israel political writing. After high school, he learned Hebrew and joined an Israeli-Palestinian families bereavement organization, and began lecturing in schools against violent activism.

Abu Sarah co-founded the alternative tour company Mejdi with his Jewish friend Scott Cooper, which gives different perspectives on any given point of interest to tourists in various multi-cultural locales. He later received recognition for his conflict resolution work in such disparate places as Colombia and Afghanistan. He has advocated for better political representation and living conditions for Palestinian residents of East Jerusalem through his association with political advisor Gershon Baskin.

== Early life ==
Abu Sarah was born in al-Eizariya, a town in the West Bank, to a Muslim family, the youngest of seven children. His father ran a produce import-export company with neighboring Arab countries. As a youth growing up during the First Intifada, he threw stones at passing Israeli cars "because we were bored, with nothing to do." His first stone was accidentally thrown at a neighbor's car. The only Jews Abu Sarah knew of were the soldiers he dodged at Israeli checkpoints, and Israeli settlers.

When Abu Sarah was 9, his older brother Tayseer was arrested from home by the Israel Defence Forces on suspicion of stone throwing and detained for almost a year. His brother died from internal injuries a few weeks after being released from custody, from what the family believed he received under torture in an Israeli prison.

The family moved to nearby East Jerusalem when Abu Sarah was 16 due to his difficulty in obtaining an Israeli identity card in al-Eizariya. He attended the Al Rashidiyeh School, and soon after joined the Fatah youth movement, which had a strong presence at the school. Abu Sarah refused to participate in the required Hebrew language instruction out of spite. As editor of the youth organization's magazine, he contributed many angry and vengeful articles. He wrote political pamphlets, a crime that could have gotten him 6 months imprisonment under the Israeli Civil Administration.

After finishing high school, Abu Sarah enrolled in an ulpan (Hebrew language school) on King George Street after realizing the career limitations of not understanding the language. There for the first time he began getting to know some Israeli Jews. He visited Yad Vashem, walked through a Haredi neighborhood and attended a Christian Bible college to obtain different perspectives on the Israeli-Palestinian conflict. Urged on by a family friend, he attended lectures with his parents sponsored by The Parents Circle-Families Forum, which featured Israelis and Palestinians who were suffering from loss of family members due to the conflict. He would later become strongly associated with the Forum.

== Activism ==
I believe that if you're not doing something, then you accept reality, and if you accept reality, then you agree with the fact that the only solution is for us to keep killing each other. It's hard for me to understand how you can accept something like that. One should do whatever he or she can to change the situation. Even if there is a tiny bit of hope, I think it is better to try to do something than sit there and do nothing.

— Aziz Abu Sarah

Abu Sarah has been described as being both a Palestinian peace activist, and a Palestinian patriot and nationalist.

To illustrate the impact of the death toll as a result of the Second Intifada, Abu Sarah helped arrange for 1,200 coffins (the number of casualties on both sides) draped with Israeli and Palestinian flags to be displayed in Rabin Square. The authorities mostly scuttled the event, but it was later successfully carried out in front of the Headquarters of the United Nations in New York City. He was instrumental in initiating a free telephone line for Israelis and Palestinians to communicate with each other and to leave voice mails, amounting to 500,000 calls in total. The program was later expanded through the internet. He has appeared at over 1,000 school venues on behalf of the Families Forum, lecturing to 30,000 people. Later as a TED fellow, he has lectured at venues in the United States and around the world.

Abu Sarah is a former co-executive director of the Center for World Religions, Diplomacy and Conflict Resolution, an arm of George Mason University's School for Conflict Analysis and Resolution. He coordinated the group's work in Islamic countries such as Afghanistan and Syria.

== Professional career ==
=== Journalism ===
Abu Sarah hosted Changing Directions, a program broadcast on the All for Peace radio station. The format revolved around interviews of members of the Bereaved Families Forum, and sought to find out how the respondents changed their outlook to the Israeli-Palestinian conflict as a result of experiencing tragedies. The station was shut down by the Israeli government in November 2011.

As a National Geographic Explorer, Abu Sarah hosted the 4-part web series documentary Conflict Zone in 2013, featuring perspectives from both sides of the conflict. He has written columns for The New York Times, Haaretz, The Jerusalem Post, The Washington Post, +972 Magazine and provided analysis on programs broadcast on CNN, Fox News and al Jazeera.

In 2026, Abu Sarah, alongside Israeli peace activist Maoz Inon, co-wrote a book entitled The Future is Peace.

=== Tourism ===
After studying tourism management, Abu Sarah founded his own tour company. Through the course of this work he met Marc Gopin of George Mason University, who inspired him to turn the company into a social entrepreneurship. In 2009, Abu Sarah, together with business partner Scott Cooper, founded Mejdi, an enterprise that offers alternative tours for Jews, Muslims and Christians on both sides in the conflict zone. Each tour is dispatched with two tour guides, one Jewish and one Palestinian, with each giving his own historical perspective. The model was so successful that it spawned similar operations in Vietnam, Turkey, Colombia, Ireland and other places experiencing cultural conflict. The company partners with National Geographic Expeditions. Gopin helped get Abu Sarah his start in international conflict resolution work.

== Political career ==
When all you do is boycott the elections, you're doing Israel a favour. You're giving Israel a blank check to do whatever it wants in our city.

— Aziz Abu Sarah

In 2018, Abu Sarah started a campaign to be the first Palestinian since 1944 to become elected mayor of Jerusalem. At first he planned to run together with his political adviser Gershon Baskin on a joint Israeli-Palestinian list, but this later changed to an all-Palestinian list called Al-Quds Lana (Jerusalem is Ours). The party did not hold large political rallies or public town halls due to fear of harassment from hardline community opponents, so instead they met with local committees, teacher's groups, students, and communities in closed door meetings. While some Palestinians gave their support, others called him a traitor, with some pelting Abu Sarah with eggs at a speech he gave outside Jerusalem city hall. The Palestine Liberation Organization has historically discouraged Palestinians from participating in Israeli elections because they claim it legitimises the occupation. The Palestinian Authority had already appointed its own governor of Jerusalem, Adnan Gaith, who said "We tell Aziz Abu Sarah, if you want to become the mayor of Jerusalem, you should wait until Jerusalem becomes the capital of the Palestinian State.

Israeli law forbids non citizens Palestinians from East Jerusalem such as Abu Sarah who are not Israeli citizens from running for office. He planned to sue to obtain this right in the Supreme Court of Israel. He asked, "If Israel really claims to be a democracy then how is it that 40 per cent of a city (the Palestinians) cannot hold the most important job?"

On 25 September 2018, Abu Sarah dropped out of the race. He cited an Israeli threat to revoke his Jerusalem resident I.D. on the grounds that most of his time was being spent outside of Jerusalem, and with his tour company. He was also concerned about opposition from Palestinian election-boycott activists who were "applying strong pressure on our candidates and their families" to end their campaign.

== Personal life ==
Abu Sarah divides his time between Virginia and Wadi al-Joz, a neighborhood of East Jerusalem. He speaks Arabic, Hebrew and English fluently, and enjoys country music.

== Awards and recognition ==
- Goldberg Prize for Peace in the Middle East from the Institute of International Education
- Solidar Silver Rose Award at the European Parliament
- Eisenhower Medallion from People to People International
- Eliav-Sartawi Award for Middle Eastern Journalism
- Intercultural Innovation Award from the United Nations Alliance of Civilizations and BMW Group
- Listed in The 500 Most Influential Muslims, 2010—2018
- Recognized by United Nations Secretary General Ban Ki-moon for his work in global conflict resolution during his speech at the 5th World Forum of the Alliance of Civilizations initiative in February 2013.

== Books and publications ==
- Clark, Kelly J.; Abu Sarah, Aziz; Kreimer, Nancy F. (2018): Strangers, Neighbors, Friends: Muslim-Christian-Jewish Reflections on Compassion and Peace. Cascade Books
- Abu Sarah, Aziz. Column roll, +972 Magazine
- Inon, Maoz; Abu Sarah, Aziz (April 14, 2026). The Future is Peace: A Shared Journey Across the Holy Land. New York: Crown Publishing Group. ISBN 979-8-217-08651-1.
