= Amr El Adly =

Egyptian writer and novelist

- Born: 1970 (age 55–56); Cairo, Egypt
- Education: B.A. and M.A. in Sociology
- Occupations: Writer and novelist
- Years active: 2008– present

Amr El Adly (Arabic:عمرو العادلي) is an Egyptian writer and novelist who was born in 1970. He is a member of Egypt writers Union. El Adly has published five-story collections, one poetry collection, and eight novels including ‘The Lamp and the Bottle’ and ‘My Name Is Fatima’ which were nominated for Sheikh Zayed Book Award in 2018 and 2019, respectively.

== Biography ==
Amr El Adly was born in Cairo on December 9, 1970. He graduated from the Department of Sociology at Ain Shams University. He is a member of the Egypt writers Union. His writing career started in 2008, when he published his first story collection "Black Bread." El Adly was influenced by ‘Art of Poetry’ by Aristotle and by ‘The Decameron’ by Giovanni Boccaccio. In 2011, he succeeded to publish his first novel which is ‘Seducing Yusuf.’ However, "the Light and the Bottle" the novel which was longlisted for the Sheikh Zayed Book Award in 2018, is the only novel he published for children and young people.

El Adly's writing style, particularly in writing stories, does not address specific audience. He tries through his writings to document his feeling and make all readers of different levels understand and feel what he felt.

Al-Adly has won many awards including the State incentive Award for his novel "The visit" in 2015. In the same year, he won the Sawiris Cultural Award for his story collection "the Story of Yusuf Idris." His novel "My Name Is Fatima" also was longlisted for the Sheikh Zayed Book Award in 2019. Since 2013, El Adly has been organizing workshops for creative writing, including ‘Dar Ishraq’ workshop for creative writing, ‘Toya’ workshop and others.

== Works ==
=== Story collections ===
- Black Bread (Original title: Khobz Asswad), 2008
- Letters for the Sky (Original title: Jawabat Lel Sama), 2008
- Story of Yusuf Idris (Original title: Qisat Yusuf Idris), 2012
- Franshi World (Original title: A’alam Franshi), 2016
- Wow, 2017

=== Poetry collections ===
- Good Morning To Me (Original title: Sabah Lkhair Ya Ana), 2014

=== Novels ===
- Seducing Yusuf (Original title: Eghwa’a Yusuf), 2011
- Schindler Catalogue (Original title: Katalough Schindler), 2013
- The Visit (Original title: Azyara), 2014
- The Unholy Trip of The Family (Original title: Rihlt Alaela Ghir El-mokadasa), 2015
- My Name Is Fatima (Original title: Ismi Fatima), 2017
- The Lamp and the Bottle (Original title: Al Misbah wa Zojaja), 2017
- Before Evening (Original title: Qabla Al Masa’a), 2018
- Ghassan Kanafani’s Men (Original title: Rijal Ghassan Kanafani), 2020

== Awards ==
- 2015: he won the State Incentive Award for his novel ‘The Visit’.
- 2016: he won the Sawiris Cultural Award- Senior Writers Section for his story collection ‘The story of Yusuf Idris’.
- 2018: he won the Egyptian Writers Union Award for his novel for his novel ‘The Unholy Trip of The Family’
- 2018: he was nominated for Sheikh Zayed Book Award for Children's Literature for his novel ‘The Lamp and The Bottle’
- 2019: he was nominated for Sheikh Zayed Book Award for Children's Literature for his novel ‘My name Is Fatima’

== See also ==
- Hossam Fahr
- Magdi El-Gabri
- Abdel Nasser El Gohary
