= El Watan News =

News outlet

- Type: general
- Format: online
- Owner: Future Media (Mohamed Al-Amin)
- Founder: Magdi El Galad
- Publisher: Future International
- Editor: Mahmoud Muslim
- Founded: 2012
- Political alignment: independent
- Website: www.elwatannews.com

El Watan News (Arabic: الوطن) is an Egyptian daily news portal published online by Future Publishing, Distribution, and Press. The portal provides breaking news reports, political analyses, and other general economic and entertainment coverage to an audience of Arabic speakers worldwide. Live, on-site video coverage and advertisements curated by Bawabat Al-Watan (the in-site ad agency) are as important to its journalistic mix as written articles. Journalist Mahmoud Muslim serves as the editor, and Mohamed Al-Amin owns Future Media. Magdi El Galad founded the site in 2012.

== Reaction to caricatures of Muhammad ==
After the release of Innocence of Muslims and the publication of caricatures of Muhammad in the French weekly Charlie Hebdo, El Watan News published a special issue in response that consisted of 15 five-panel cartoons tackling Islamophobia in Western media. They were published on the website alongside articles translated into several languages.
