= Mohammad Najib Abdallah =

Egyptian writer and physician

- Born: 26 June 1974 (age 52); Denmark
- Education: University of Cairo
- Occupations: Physician and writer
- Writing career
- Language: Arabic

Mohamed Naguib Abdullah Shaaban Wafi (born June 26, 1974, in Denmark), known as Mohamed Naguib Abdullah, is an Egyptian writer and physician. He has written various short stories and translated his collection of short stories, Before the Death of a King, into Italian and French. In medicine, he obtained his master's and doctorate degrees in internal medicine in 2007 from the Faculty of Medicine, Cairo University. He works as a professor of internal medicine at the university’s Faculty of Medicine.

== Bibliography ==
=== Novels ===
- Arabic: ما قبل وفاة الملك, romanized: ma qabel wafat almalek, lit. 'Before The Death of the King', 2005, 9776148069
- Arabic: عندما تموت القطط, romanized: endama tamot alketat, lit. 'When The Cats Die', 2007.
- Arabic: العزف على أوتار بشرية, romanized: alazef ala awtar basharreya, lit. 'Playing Human Strings', 2008.
- Arabic: المبتعدون لكي يقتربوا, romanized: almobtaedon lekay yaktarebo, lit. 'Far away to get close',2012.
- Arabic: كريستال, romanized: krystal, lit. 'Crystal',2014.
- Arabic: شيروفوبيا, romanized: shyrophopia, lit. 'Cherophobia',2014.ISBN 9789775153388, 9775153387
- Arabic: متاعب الجهاز الهضمي في رمضان, romanized: mataeb aljehaz alhadmy fi ramadan, lit. 'Digestive problems in Ramadan',2014.ISBN 9789770816325.
- Arabic: العابر, romanized: alaber, lit. 'The Passenger',2016,ISBN 9789775153777.
- Arabic: بوابة سليمان, romanized: bawabat suleman, lit. 'Sulaiman's Gate',2018,ISBN 9789778240382, 9778240388.

== Memberships ==
- Member of the Egyptian Writers Union
- Member of the story club in the hunting club
- Member of the literary activity of the 6th of October Club
- Member of the Egyptian Society for the Study of Liver and Digestive Diseases (as a physician)
- Member of the European Society of Gastrointestinal Endoscopy (as a physician)
- Member of the Arab Society for the Study of Diabetes and Metabolism (as a physician)

== See also ==
- Abdelnasser Gohary
