= Mossi Raz =

Israeli politician

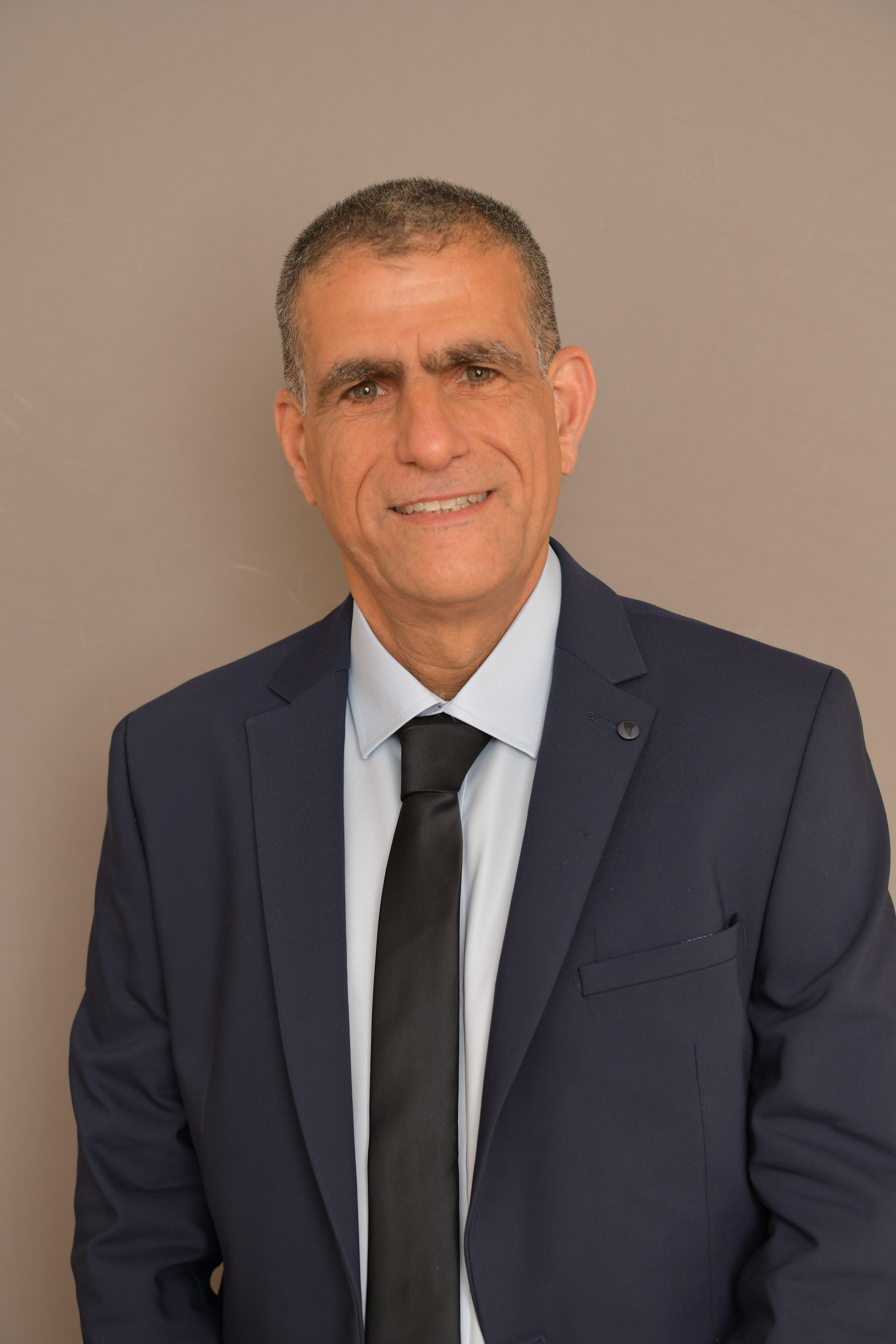
- Raz in 2021

Faction represented in the Knesset
- 2000–2003: Meretz
- 2017–2019: Meretz
- 2021–2022: Meretz

Personal details
- Born: 19 December 1965 (age 60) Jerusalem, Israel

Moshe "Mossi" Raz (Hebrew: מֹשֶׁה "מוּסִי" רָז; born 19 December 1965) is an Israeli politician. He was a member of the Knesset for Meretz in three spells between 2000 and 2022.

== Early life ==
Born in Jerusalem to Kurdish-Jewish parents, during his IDF national service Raz volunteered to serve as a paratrooper in the Paratroopers Brigade. He served as a soldier and a squad leader. Later on he became an infantry officer, after completing Officer Candidate School, and served as a platoon leader in the elite Maglan unit, where he continues to serve as a reserve major.

He earned a BA in accounting and economics from the Hebrew University.

== Political career ==
An activist, Raz has served as secretary general of Peace Now and director of the non-profit organisation Ir Shalem. For the 1999 Knesset elections Raz was placed 11th on the Meretz list, but missed out on a seat when they won only 10 mandates. However, he entered the Knesset on 25 February 2000 when Haim Oron resigned his seat.

He won eighth place on the party's list for the 2003 elections, but lost his seat when the party was reduced to six seats. Raz was placed tenth on the list for the 2006 elections, but the party won only five seats. Prior to the 2009 elections he won fourth place on the Meretz list, but the party won only three seats.

In 2011 he was questioned by the police for managing a radio station which they said broadcast illegally.

Raz was placed sixth on the Meretz list for the 2015 Knesset elections, narrowly missing out on a return to the legislature as Meretz won five seats. In 2015 Likud MK Miki Zohar claimed Raz justifies attacks on Israelis, urging Meretz members to "condemn MKs who go on terrorist flotillas and [former Meretz MK] Mossi Raz, who, on the day of the [fatal terror] attack [near Dolev], wrote that it was because of settlements." Labor Knesset Member Stav Shaffir dismissed Zohar's statement as "a blatant, ugly, nauseating lie" and asked the Attorney General to investigate Zohar for defamation.

Raz re-entered the Knesset on 22 October 2017 as a replacement for Meretz leader Zehava Gal-On after she gave up her seat.

Raz was active in opposing a short-lived Israeli government policy to forcibly deport asylum seekers to Rwanda. In February 2018, he visited Rwanda, together with Michal Rozin, to try to get that government to end its cooperation with the deportation plan. He lost his seat in the April 2019 elections.

Raz was placed sixth on Meretz's list for the 2021 elections, and regained his seat in the Knesset as Meretz won six seats. However, Meretz failed to cross the electoral threshold in the 2022 elections and Raz lost his seat.

== Awards ==
In 2010 Raz and colleague Maysa Baransi-Siniora were awarded the Outstanding Contribution to Peace prize by the International Council for Press and Broadcasting at the International Media Awards in London for his work with All for Peace radio.
