= Mohamed Salmawy =

Mohamed Salmawy is a leading Egyptian intellectual whose writings are widely read throughout the Arab World. He is the former president of the Writers Union of Egypt and the secretary general of the General Union of Arab Writers. A former editor-in-chief of a number of leading publications, including the widely circulated independent news-paper Al-Masry Al-Youm, he is one of Egypt’s most prominent columnists, play wrights and novelists.

== Literary works ==
Notable titles include Butterfly Wings, translated by Raphael Cohen, and The Last Station: Naguib Mahfouz Looking Back, translated by Andy Smart. His literary writings have been widely translated, and his novel “Butterfly Wings” (AUC Press, 2014) predicted, when it first appeared in Arabic in 2010, the 2011 Revolution that led to the ouster of President Hosni Mubarak.

== Awards ==
He is the recipient of a number of prestigious decorations from France, Italy and Belgium; and his books have received a number of literary awards. Salmawy received the Prestigious Medal of Honor of Palestine from Mahmoud Abbas, the President of Palestinian Authority on 22 November 2017.
