= Hossam Bahgat =

Egyptian human rights activist (born 1978)

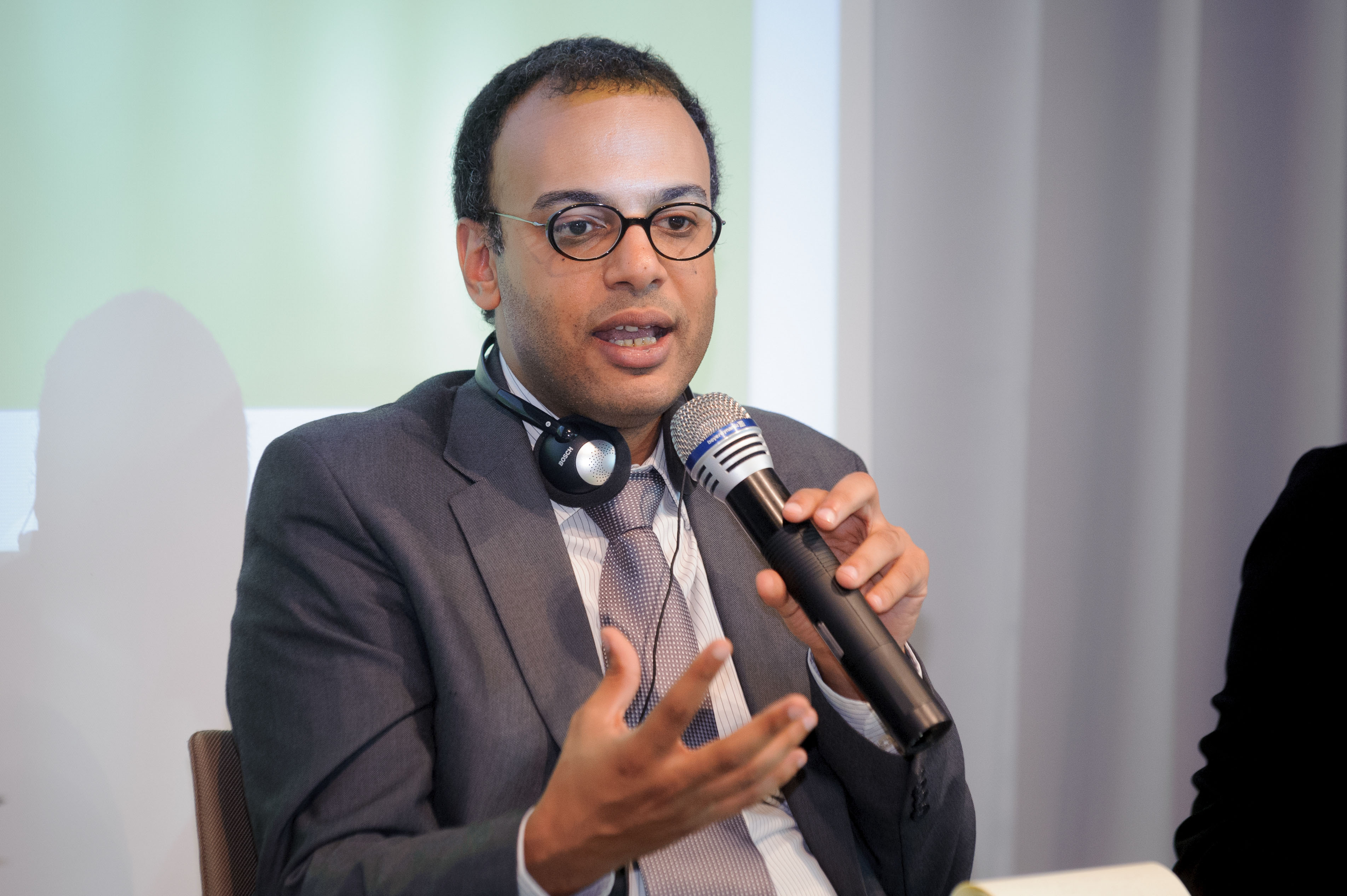
- Born: 1978 (age 47–48)
- Occupations: Activist, journalist
- Known for: Rights activism

Hossam Bahgat (Arabic: حسام بهجت [ħoˈsæːm ˈbæhɡæt]; born 1978) is an Egyptian human rights activist and the founder of the Egyptian Initiative for Personal Rights. He was an investigative journalist at Mada Masr. He was the 2011 recipient of the Alison Des Forges Award from Human Rights Watch "for upholding the personal freedoms of all Egyptians."

== Early life ==
Hossam Bahgat was born in 1978 in Alexandria. He studied and still lives in the same city.

== Career ==
Bahgat started his career as a journalist. He subsequently worked for the Egyptian Organization for Human Rights (EOHR), but he was dismissed in 2001 following public disagreements over the organization's inaction regarding 52 gay men having been arrested on the basis of their sexuality (a mass arrest known as the "Queen Boat incident").

On July 23, 2001, Bahgat published an article in MERIP criticizing government crackdown on Egyptian gay communities and a "shattered rights movement," directly addressing the mass arrest. He was dismissed from his EOHR position two days after publication.

Following his departure from EOHR, he founded the Egyptian Initiative for Personal Rights, a human rights organization, in 2002. It was the first human rights organization in Egypt to recognize LGBT rights as human rights.

== Persecution ==
Bahgat was arrested on 8 November 2015 for three days for "publishing false news that harms national interests and disseminating information that disturbs public peace" during the presidency of Abdel Fattah el-Sisi. The arrest was condemned both by the Committee to Protect Journalists and Amnesty International. In January 2016, he issued more public criticism of el-Sisi's regime, stating that the "level of repression now [was] significantly higher than it was under the Mubarak regime."

In 2016, he was banned from traveling and his assets were frozen on the background of Case 173, known as the foreign funding case, which targeted dozens of nongovernmental organizations. In 2020 the European Parliament passed a resolution titled The deteriorating situation of human rights in Egypt, in particular the case of the activists of the Egyptian Initiative for Personal Rights (EIPR), in which it is recognized that EIPR "provides an invaluable service in promoting personal, political, civil, economic and social rights and freedoms in the country," and is asked to revoke the restrictive measures against Bahgat.

In July 2021, an investigative judge in Case 173 summoned Bahgat and interrogated him after the National Security Agency accused him of inciting the public against state institutions. In response, the United States State Department said it "is concerned by continued detentions, indictments, and harassment of Egyptian civil society leaders [...] including the indictment of the Director General of the Egyptian Initiative for Personal Rights, Hossam Bahgat."

On March 20, 2024, an Egyptian court dropped the charges against five of the last remaining non-governmental organizations accused of receiving foreign funds to harm the state in Case 173/2011, reversing earlier decisions to freeze their assets, and ban their members from traveling. The decision included Bahgat's name.

In January 2025, Bahgat received summons to appear before the Supreme State Security Prosecution on 19 January on unknown charges.

== Awards ==
Bahgat received the journalism price Anna Politkovskaja from the Italian magazine Internazionale in September 2016 in Ferrara. In his speech at the ceremony, he said, "I well know that we will have to struggle, if not for a victory, at least for keeping track of this harsh period of Egyptian history."
