= Magdi El-Gabri =

Egyptian writer and poet

- Born: 1961
- Died: 1999 (aged 37–38)
- Education: Diploma in Agriculture
- Alma mater: Ain Shams University
- Occupations: writer, poet, researcher
- Years active: 1990–1999

Magdi El-Gabri (Arabic: مجدي عبد الهادي الجابري), Egyptian poet and researcher. He has published several collections of poetry, including "August" which was published in 1990 by Dar Al-Masrya. He died in 1999 of lung cancer.

== Biography ==
Magdi Abdel-Hadi Al-Gabri was born in Umm Al-Masryeen neighborhood in Giza, Egypt in 1961. His mother gave birth to 16 children and he was the ninth child and one of two boys who lived after the death of his six siblings. For this reason, and to protect him from the evil eye, his family treated him as a girl by dressing him as a girl, lengthening his hair, and changing his name to a girl's name until he started his primary school studies. El-Gabri studied his middle school at Al-Ahram School, and his secondary school at Saidia Military school in 1979. Later, he obtained a Diploma in Higher Institute for Agricultural Cooperation from Ain Shams University, and obtained a postgraduate diploma in folk arts from the Academy of Arts in 1992. Then, he worked as a proofreader for the "radio and television" magazine, then worked as a cultural specialist at the General Organization of Culture Palaces. El-Gabri married his wife, Safaa Abdel Moneim, who was also a writer, in 1988. His writing career began when he was still studying at the Agriculture College at Ain Shams University, where he wrote a play entitle "A Passport on Meat Paper". He published his first poetry collection "August" a few months prior to the Gulf War in 1990. Then he published his second collection named "Exactly As If It Happened" in 1995. He also published the poem "A Scandal, and a Scandal Must Be Completed" in which he mocked the wars that are taking place in the Arab world.

=== His death ===
El-Gabri was diagnosed with lung cancer in 1998. He moved to the "Umm Al-Masryeen" hospital. After taking his first chemotherapy does, he died in 1999.

== Works ==
- "August" (original title: Ashustus), 1990
- "Exactly as if It Happened" (original title: Bil Thabt wa Ka'anahu Hasal), 1994
- "A Boy Listening to Stories" (original title: Ayeel Byestad Hawadeeth), 1995
- "Life is Not a Rehearsal" (original title: Al Hayat Min Profa), 2010

== See also ==
- Abdel Nasser El-Gohary
- Hossam Fahr
- Amr El Adly
