= Mada Masr =

Independent Egyptian online newspaper

Mada Masr مدى مصر
- Independent, progressive journalism
- Format: Online newspaper
- Founded: 30 June 2013
- Language: Arabic and English
- Country: Egypt
- Website: Official website

Mada Masr (Arabic: مدى مصر) is an independent Egyptian online newspaper, founded in June 2013 by former journalists of the English-language newspaper Egypt Independent following the shutting down of its editorial operations in April 2013. Its editorial alignment has been described as liberal.

On 27 October 2026, an Egyptian court ordered the closure of Mada Masr.

== History ==
=== Predecessors ===
Cover of the final edition of Egypt Independent

Egypt Independent was a weekly, 24-page English-language newspaper that had evolved from the English web edition of the newspaper Al-Masry Al-Youm. Its first edition was published on 24 November 2011.

In December 2011, the second edition of the newspaper was prevented from being printed, following internal censorship of an article written by political scientist Robert Springborg which was critical of the Supreme Council of the Armed Forces.

In April 2013, the editorial team was informed by the management of Al-Masry Media Corporation that their print and online news operation would be shut down. The editorial team decided to put together a closing edition, which would have been published on 25 April, "to explain the conditions under which a strong voice of independent and progressive journalism in Egypt is being terminated". However, the management decided in the last minute to withhold the printing of the final edition, so the editorial team decided to publish it online.

The online edition of Egypt Independent was re-launched later that year.

=== Formation ===
On 30 June 2013, Mada Masr published its first issue, run by Lina Attalah and some of the staff from the former Egypt Independent.

In the first article published, the editorial team described the planning process for the launch: "We decided we want to publish in Arabic as well as English, that we want to see more data-based reports, more investigative journalism. We want to experiment with different ways of storytelling. And very importantly, develop a business model and deploy a visionary commercial team that helps make our work sustainable."

The article also described how the editorial team arrived at the name: "It needed a name. An Arabic name that was easy to say in English, but one that also reflected our practice of independent, progressive journalism. After a long process, we came to Mada. It is the Arabic word for range, scope or span, but it's also the spot where a stone is placed on a ring, a symbol of taking a position."

The article concluded with: "Today Mada Masr is born amid many challenges and uncertainties. But it's also born out of inevitability. It is the inevitability of rebuilding a home for our team and our practice, the inevitability of a different form of journalism, the inevitability of experimentation and adventure as the only gateway for our imagination to strive."

Since then, Mada Masr published a number of articles on different topics such as politics, economy, environment, culture and lifestyle, and some of their articles on current affairs in Egypt were referenced by international news media. As an example, an article by Sarah Carr about the political movement The Third Square was quoted extensively in a New York Times blog article about the subject.

=== Censorship ===
In July 2013, an article by the Associated Press about media bias in Egypt following the overthrow of Mohamed Morsi quoted Lina Atallah, editor-in-chief of Mada Masr, as saying that there was increased pressure on journalists to toe the line, pointing to the coverage of protester killings, which repeated the interim government and military's official narrative. "What's scary about this time around in the media performance is that there is much more agenda-setting from above," she said.

Mada Masr has been blocked in Egypt since May 2017, alongside twenty other websites featuring political content perceived as friendly to the Muslim Brotherhood and hostile to the government., and dissident contributing writers. In a statement to the official Egyptian news agency MENA, a security source stated that the websites in question were blocked due to propagating what the source perceived to be fake news. Mada Masr Media Company filed a lawsuit several weeks later, petitioning the Egyptian National Telecom Regulatory Authority (NTRA) to provide official documentation of the decision behind the block, if there had been one, and a technical explanation as to how the block was enacted, requesting that ISPs remove obstacles placed to prevent users from accessing its website. The NTRA denied it was responsible for administering the block, an assertion it maintained throughout the case.

Lawyers representing Mada Masr and the Communications and Information Technology Ministry argued that the NTRA was solely responsible, and the NTRA countered that website blocks fell under the purview of the Supreme Media Regulatory Council or a national security body, which includes the presidency, the Interior Ministry, the General Intelligence Services and the Administrative Control Authority, as designated by Article 1 of the communication law (Law 10/2003).

According to Article 64 of the law, the Armed Forces are also considered an agency concerned with national security, when it comes to technical capabilities that include telecommunications equipment, systems and programs. As media regulatory bodies continued to deny involvement in the blocking of access to its website, Mada Masr Media requested that the court add the president of Egypt, the defense minister, deputy head of the General Intelligence Service, the interior minister and head of the Supreme Media Regulatory Council as respondents in the case.

With no information provided by state lawyers or the NTRA, on 30 September 2018, the date the court had set to announce a verdict, the court referred the case for a technical review. The case was to be referred to the NTRA, but because the body was a respondent in the case, it was instead handed to the Authority of Experts at the Justice Ministry, essentially suspending the judicial process until an unknown date. According to lawyer Hazem Azhary, the ministry's Authority of Experts can take years to examine a case.

On 24 November 2019, plainclothes police officers raided the headquarters of Mada Masr, briefly arresting Atallah as well as staff members Mohamed Hamma and Rana Mamdouh. The three were later released hours later, alongside staff member Shady Zalat, who was arrested separately at his residence and detained at an unspecified location. The Egyptian prosecution, citing national security investigations, alleged that Mada Masr was founded by the illegal Islamist organization the Muslim Brotherhood, with the intent of spreading fake news. Foreign Ministry spokesman Ahmed Hafez defended the Mada Masr raid, stating that the organization was operating without legal authorization and that the raid was conducted in compliance with the law.

Atallah was later arrested a second time on 17 May 2020 by Egyptian security forces. She was released on bail later the same day.

On 8 September 2022, Egyptian authorities summoned and interrogated chief editor Lina Attalah and Mada Masr journalists Rana Mamdouh, Sara Seif Eddin, and Beesan Kassab. They were later charged with "spreading false news" and defamation against the pro-government Nation's Future Party in relation to an article on party's alleged corruption. The party was closely associated with President Abdel Fattah El-Sisi. The journalists were all released on bail. The Egyptian authorities, under El-Sisi's leadership, have increasingly consolidated their grip on the media through online censorship, raiding and closing independent media outlets and controlling content in both public and private media.

=== Trials and closure ===
On 22 October 2026, Attalah was questioned and referred to trial on a charge of establishing and managing a website without a license, facing E£1–3 million (US$18–54,000) of fines if convicted. The court date was set for 27 October. Mada Masr said it had been applying for a license since 2018, with its latest application pending since 2023.

On 27 October 2026, an Egyptian court ordered the closure of Mada Masr and imposed a fine of E£3 million on Attalah. She was released following the fine being paid by Mada Masr. During the proceedings she discovered that in 2024 she had been sentenced to one year in prison in abstention with a retrial scheduled for November.

Amnesty International spokesperson, Yasmine Ahmed, said the actions were "designed to shut down one of the country's last remaining independent media voices". The decision was also condemned by Reporters Without Borders and The Committee to Protect Journalists (CJP). The head of the Egyptian Initiative for Personal Rights, Hossam Bahgat said "this escalation validates our fears that the arrest and continued detention of the six Matsadaash journalists would signal a crackdown of unprecedented magnitude". According to the EIPR the actions are part of a wider crackdown on journalism in Egypt.

The World Press Freedom Index ranks Egypt 169th (out of 180) in terms of press freedom in 2026. According to the CJP there were a total of 25 journalists imprisoned in Egypt at the time of Attalah's arrest.
