= Mejdi Tours =

Tour company

MEJDI Tours is a full-service tour company.

MEJDI Tours has operated tours in Israel and in the Palestinian Authority, Ireland and Northern Ireland, Jordan, Turkey, Iraqi Kurdistan, Spain, and Egypt, among others. They have organized Christian, Jewish, Muslim, university and non-profit tours. Past clients include Boston University, Arcadia University, Pardes Institute for Jewish Studies, American Israel Public Affairs Committee (AIPAC), National Community Church, Brisbane Church of Christ, World Vision, Hands of Peace, and Churches for Middle East Peace.

MEJDI Tours is also the sole operator of National Geographic's Holy Land and Traveling the Sands of Time: Oman to Dubai expeditions.

The company's two-guide model equips groups with two local guides. Originally launched in Israel and Palestine as a dual narrative tour—where MEJDI travelers are guided by one Palestinian guide and one Israeli—this model is now an option in all MEJDI destinations.

In 2014, MEJDI co-founder Aziz Abu Sarah gave a TED Talk about MEJDI Tours' concept and goals.

Reports about MEJDI Tours have been published by National Geographic, The Toronto Star, the United Nations World Travel Organization, the United Nations Alliance of Civilizations, Forbes, and Haaretz.

== See also ==
- Israeli-Palestinian peace process
- Valley of Peace Initiative
