= Majdi Toumi =

Tunisian volleyball player (born 1975)

Personal information
- Nationality: Tunisian
- Born: 29 August 1975 (age 49)

Sport
- Sport: Volleyball

Majdi Toumi (born 29 August 1975) is a Tunisian volleyball player. He competed in the men's tournament at the 1996 Summer Olympics.
