= Magdi Qorqor =

Egyptian Labour Party Secretary General

Mohammed Magdi Qorqor, is the Secretary General of Egyptian Labour Party, whose activity was suspended by the Egyptian Party Affairs Committee in the year 2000. He is an Egyptian politician and journalist, and a professor and head of the Environmental Planning and Infrastructure Department College of Urban Planning Cairo University. He had prominent activity in the Engineers Against the Guard movement, and is a leader in the National Alliance to Support Legitimacy and rejected the coup, which been created on 2013 against the military coup in Egypt.

== Scientific Degrees ==
- Bachelor of Civil Engineering (BSc) – Cairo University – July 1975
- Master of Science (MSc) in Civil Engineering 1981
- Doctor of Philosophy (PhD) in Civil Engineering 1986

== Political activities ==
- Secretary General of the Labour Party (Egypt), June 2011.
- Assistant Secretary General of the Labour Party 1993 to June 2011
- Assistant General Coordinator Egyptian Movement for Change "Kifaya" (February 2007 – January 2011).
- One of the founders and a member of the Executive Office Egyptian Movement for Change "Kifaya" (February 2005 – February 2007).
- Member of the Board of Trustees of the Global Campaign to Counter the Aggression (February 2005 – date)
- Member of the Islamic National Conference – 2000 to date (Beirut)
- Coordinator of the Front of the Ummah Scholars and Thinkers – Cairo (2003–2007)
- Member of the National Committee for the Defence of Prisoners of Conscience (1993–present).
- Secretary of Education – Labour Party 1989 to June 2011
- Participated in student activity at Cairo University (1970–1975)

== Imprisonment and detention ==
Qorqor was arrested on 2 July 2014 one day before the first anniversary of the military coup in Egypt and after the National Alliance to Support Legitimacy call for demonstrations in That memory, and he was charged with joining a terrorist group and inciting violence, according to investigations However, the court released him in that case as he is not guilty.

Qorqor was previously arrested in the events of 6 April 2008 with the April 6 Youth Movement, and he was released after 18 days after his college students at Cairo University demonstrated, denouncing his arrest.
