= All for Peace =

Radio station in Jerusalem

all for Peace
- Ramallah; Palestine
- Broadcast area: Israel and Palestine
- Frequency: 107.2 MHz 87.8 MHz

Programming
- Languages: Arabic, English, Hebrew and Russian

History
- First air date: 2004
- Last air date: 17 November 2011

Links
- Webcast: allforpeace.org/eng/live
- Website: allforpeace.org

All for Peace (Hebrew: רדיו כל השלום; Arabic: راديو صوت السلام) was a joint Israeli-Palestinian East Jerusalem based radio station that transmitted from Ramallah in the Palestinian territories. It was founded in 2004 with the stated aim of having "a positive role in resolving the conflict" and describes itself as not-for-profit. A significant section of its independent revenue came from commercial advertising. It was the first radio station staffed by Israelis and Palestinians to be broadcast in both Arabic and Hebrew. The Israeli and Palestinian co-directors of the station were joint winners of the International Council for Press and Broadcasting's "Outstanding Contribution to Peace" award in 2010, part of the International Media Awards. The station was shut down by the Israeli government in November 2011 for "broadcasting into Israel illegally".

== History ==
All for Peace was set up in 2004 as a joint initiative of Givat Haviva's Jewish-Arab Center for Peace, an Israeli organization, and Biladi, a Palestinian publishing company. Its co-directors are Jewish Israeli Mossi Raz and Palestinian Maysa Baransi-Siniora. It was the first radio station staffed by Israelis and Palestinians to broadcast in both Arabic and Hebrew. The original plan for the station was to host shows in both Arabic and Hebrew to promote intercultural awareness between Arabs and Jews in their own languages. English broadcasts were added not long after the station started because, according to Maysa Baransi-Siniora, "English is a language that both sides understand." In 2004, when the station started, content was initially generated in Jerusalem and broadcast over the Internet while the station waited for their radio transmitter to be released by Israeli customs officials in Tel Aviv. The station regarded broadcasting over the FM band as important because many potential listeners did not have Internet access. Although the station had been provided with rights to one of the Palestinian Authority's approved radio frequencies, bureaucratic difficulties at a time when there were poor relations between Israel and the Palestinian Authority and no peace negotiations delayed the transmitter's delivery to Ramallah for several months. After some initial delays, the station started broadcasting from Ramallah in the West Bank but its offices and recording studio, where programs are recorded and uploaded to the Internet, are in East Jerusalem. The station was conceived as a replacement for Abie Nathan's Voice of Peace radio station that stopped broadcasting in 1993. A small difference in the spelling between the Hebrew names of the stations was used to differentiate between them.

== Programming ==
The multi-lingual station, staffed by both Israelis and Palestinians, broadcasts to both Israel and the Palestinian territories in Arabic, English, Hebrew and Russian. The stated goals of the station are to expose various aspects of each side in the conflict to the other side through interviews, artists and various topics, to break stereotypes, discuss common interests, report joint initiatives and ideas to end the conflict, provide hope to listeners and prepare them for when the conflict ends. The station says that it aims for "a wide audience that encompasses both peoples, and seeks to provide messages of peace, freedom, democracy, cooperation, mutual understanding, coexistence, and hope". The station broadcast a weekly program by the Parents Circle-Families Forum, a grassroots organization of Palestinian and Israeli families who have lost immediate family members in the conflict.

== Sponsorship and funding ==
The radio station has received sponsorship from the Anne Frank Fonds foundation, Belgium's Flemish Department of Foreign Affairs, the European Union, the German Federal Foreign Office, the Givat Haviva friends association in Switzerland, the German Institute for Foreign Cultural Relations, the Foundation for Middle East Peace, the Royal Norwegian Embassy in Israel, the Rich Foundation, the Sam Spiegel Foundation, Philipp Burckhardt Stiftung Zurich-Switzerland, USAID, the United States Institute of Peace, and United Nations organisations. A substantial proportion of its income, prior to being ordered to stop broadcasting, came from advertising.

== Reception ==
The station has been cited as one of several examples of joint ventures, founded by Arabs and Jews, that "highlight or create joint identities". It has been described as being "unique for its willingness to talk to far-right Israelis as much as to militant Palestinians". Co-directors Mossi Raz and Maysa Baransi-Siniora were joint winners of the International Council for Press and Broadcasting's sixth annual International Media Awards in 2010. They won the "Outstanding Contribution to Peace" award.

== Shutdown ==
The station was shut down by the Israeli Communications Ministry on 17 November 2011 for "broadcasting into Israel illegally". The Israeli government explained that the station began broadcasting "an increasing number of Hebrew-language commercials", which "led to economic damage to legal Israeli regional radio stations". The station says that since it transmits from Ramallah in the Palestinian territories and has a licence from the Palestinian Authority it does not require permission from Israel. According to the Israeli co-director of the station, Mossi Raz, over the past seven years the station has been in regular contact with the Ministry of Communications and has not been told to seek an Israeli licence, asked to stop broadcasting, or warned about a problem with the station's existence or programs. Raz said that the station's income was increasing and local radio stations may have complained to the Minister of Communications resulting in some pressure to close the station down.

According to the station's operators, on 4 November 2011, the station received a letter from the Ministry of Communications that said the station was operating illegally and must stop broadcasting immediately, a charge they denied. The station responded to the Ministry in writing and on 17 November 2011 Mossi Raz was questioned under caution by the police and told that he must order an end to the broadcasts or the police would carry out a raid of the offices and he would be remanded by a judge and arrested. According to the station operators, Raz was forced to sign a statement that said he would "stop the broadcasts that are intended for the residence of Israel" and instruct the station to stop the Hebrew on-air radio broadcast on 107.2 FM until further notice before the police would release him. Raz described it as "a political decision" and "an anti-democratic move".

On 20 November, approximately 500 Israeli journalists attended an "emergency conference" in Tel Aviv to discuss what they regarded as "unprecedented and immediate threats to their free expression" and to protest the closure of All for Peace, the planned government closure of Channel 10 and government-supported libel legislation. The head of the Israeli journalists' association described the closure as part of "a wave of legislation and other measures against a free press in Israel that very much worries anyone who cares about Israeli democracy".

Danny Danon, a member of the Knesset for Likud who had lodged a complaint about the station with the Attorney General two months previously, took credit for the shut down. He said a "radical leftist station that becomes an instrument of incitement must not be allowed to broadcast to the public", reportedly in response to a show where presenters encouraged Palestinians to demonstrate in support of the Palestinian bid for statehood recognition by the United Nations. Danon said he had lobbied the Ministry of Communications and described the police action as "carrying out justice" and that the station's broadcasts "were unacceptable". A Communications Ministry spokesman said that the order to stop broadcasting "had nothing to do with politics." A petition filed by the station in the High Court of Justice challenging the shut-down order was denied. According to the station, the shutdown order reduced advertising income from NIS 64,000 in November 2011 to NIS 6,000 in December 2011 and resulted in ten paid staff being laid off.
