= Magdi Amin =

Sudanese-American economist

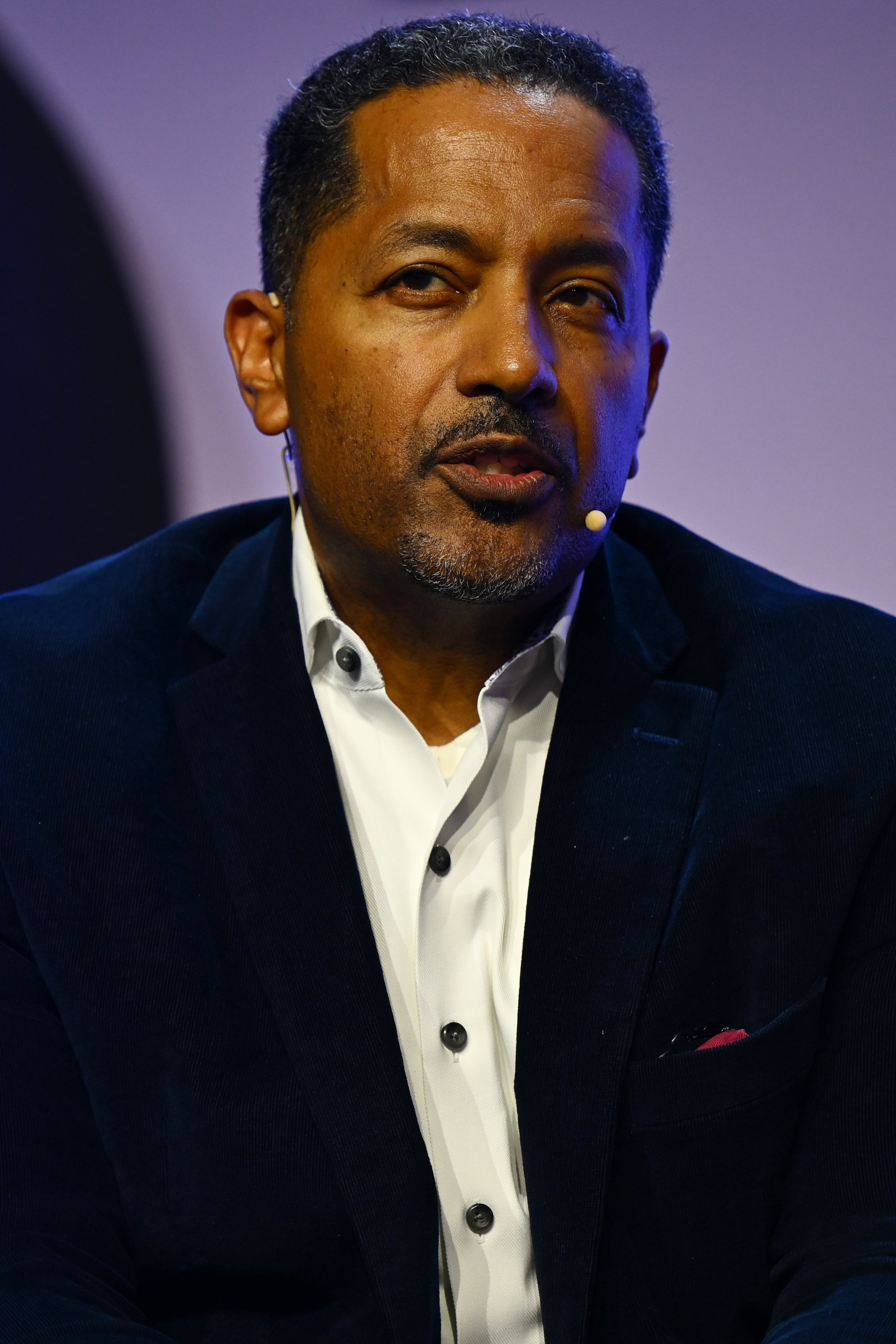
- Amin in 2024

Managing partner at African Renaissance Ventures
- Incumbent
- Assumed office 2022

Senior Advisor to the Ministry of Finance and Economic Planning of Sudan
- In office 2020–2022

Personal details
- Born: Magdi M. Amin; 1966 (age 59–60)
- Citizenship: American
- Education: Princeton School of Public and International Affairs, School of Advanced International Studies
- Profession: Economist
- Portfolio: Business Finance

Magdi Amin is a Sudanese-American economist and venture capitalist. He is the founder and managing partner of African Renaissance Ventures, a venture capital firm focused on seed-stage companies in East Africa, founded 2022.

Amin worked at the World Bank and the International Finance Corporation for two decades between 1998 and 2018, holding senior roles in private sector development and corporate strategy. From 2018, he become the Investment Partner at Omidyar Network and was appointed Managing Director in September 2019.

At World Bank, Amin worked in politically and economically transitional areas including Thailand during the Asian Financial Crisis, Ethiopia during political unrest, Egypt during the Arab Spring, and Sudan's post-2019 transitional period, during which he served as Senior Advisor to the Ministry of Finance since 2020.

== Early life and education ==
Amin grew up between Sudan and California. His father, a Sudanese diplomat, relocated the family to the United States following political unrest in Sudan. Amin earned a Bachelor of Arts degree from Princeton School of Public and International Affairs in 1988. He later obtained a Master of Arts in International Economics and Middle East Studies from the Johns Hopkins University School of Advanced International Studies (SAIS) in 1991.

== Career ==
In 1998, Amin joined the World Bank as a Senior Private Sector Specialist. He worked in the Africa Region and the East Asia and Pacific Region, contributing to private sector development programs in countries including Sudan, Ethiopia, Thailand, Malaysia, and Cambodia. Amin worked in Ethiopia for the World Bank between 2005 and 2008. During this time, he supported responses to countries in political and economic transitions, including post-socialist Central Europe, Thailand during the Asian Financial Crisis, Ethiopia during political unrest, and Egypt during the Arab Spring.

In February 2008, Amin joined the International Finance Corporation, a member of the World Bank Group. He served in senior positions, including, Principal Economist in the Office of the Executive Vice President in 2013 and Manager for Corporate Strategy and Partnership for three years until 2018.

In 2018, Amin served as Investment Partner at Omidyar Network. He was appointed Managing Director in September 2019. His work involved early-stage technology investments and policy engagement related to digital governance and responsible technology. In a 2019 interview with Biometric Update, Amin discussed the development of digital identity systems in African countries and outlined Omidyar Network’s approach to what it describes as “Good ID.”

In 2020, Amin served as Senior Advisor to the Ministry of Finance and Economic Planning of the Republic of Sudan, providing strategic guidance during the country's post-2019 coup transitional period.

In 2023, Amin became Managing Partner of African Renaissance Ventures, a venture capital firm investing in seed-stage technology companies in Africa, with a focus on East Africa. Since 2023, African Renaissance Ventures has invested in early-stage technology companies in East Africa, including Emata, Kubik, Credify, Kapsule, Tembo and Charis UAS.

Since August 2022, Amin has served as Adjunct Faculty at the Johns Hopkins University School of Advanced International Studies. He has also served as Adjunct Instructor at Carnegie Mellon University Africa, where he teaches on responsible digital development. Since 2025, Amin has advised the Africa AI Council on expanding AI access for African economic development. He writes on Sudanese and Nubian history.
