= Egypt Independent =

Egyptian online newspaper

- Format: Daily, online
- Owner: Al-Masry Media Corporation
- Editor: Heba Helmy
- Founded: November 2011
- Language: English
- Headquarters: Cairo
- Country: Egypt
- Website: EgyptIndependent.com

Egypt Independent is an online newspaper that formerly published a weekly 24-page English-language edition of the Egyptian newspaper, Al-Masry Al-Youm.

== History ==
On 24 November 2011, the first print edition of Egypt Independent was published. It had evolved from the English edition of Al-Masry Al-Youm, which was previously published as a weekly supplement to the newspaper.

After being banned to publish their second edition by the editor in chief of Al-Masry Al-Youm, Egypt Independent acquired its own license and resumed publishing its weekly edition separate from Al-Masry Al-Youm in 2012.

In April 2013, the management of Al-Masry Media Corporation informed the Egypt Independent editorial team that the print news operation was being shut down, though the website continues to publish new stories, daily.

In June 2013, some former employees of Egypt Independent including Managing Editor Lina Attalah began publishing Mada Masr.

== Accusations of internal censorship ==
On 1 December 2011, the chief editor of Al-Masry Al-Youm objected to and ultimately censored a print issue of Egypt Independent.

The second issue of Egypt Independent was to carry an opinion piece by Robert Springborg, a political scientist and expert on Egyptian civil-military relations, that was critical of the Supreme Council of the Armed Forces that had ruled Egypt since the February 2011 departure of former president Housni Mubarak. Springborg and the Egypt Independent staff collaborated to alter the offending sections in the opinion piece, however the second issue of the supplement was nevertheless prevented from being published. Professor Springborg was himself accused of being a "conspirator against Egypt's stability" in the 7 December 2011 Arabic-language edition of Al-Masry Al-Youm.

The self-censorship episode prompted the staff of Egypt Independent to write that "even after 25 January, self-censorship still plagues Egyptian media. As an Egyptian newspaper, we, too, suffer from it. But if self-censorship becomes internalized and goes unquestioned, it becomes an irreversible practice. We refuse to let this happen."

== See also ==
- Mada Masr
- Al-Masry Al-Youm
