= Magdi El Galad =

Egyptian journalist

Magdi Mahmoud Abdallah Hussein El Gallad
- Born: September 6, 1964 (age 61); Menya Al Qamh, Sharqia Governorate, Egypt
- Education: Cairo University
- Occupation: Journalist

Magdi El Gallad (Egyptian: مجدى الجلاد; born 6 of September 1964) is an Egyptian journalist. He is the editor-in-chief of the Egyptian newspaper Al-Watan, and he is the first to hold the position since the newspaper was founded in March 2012.

== Career ==
Gallad started his career as an investigative journalist for Al-Ahram. He is the founding editor of Al Watan newspaper. Before that, he was the editor-in-chief of the independent daily newspaper Al-Masry Al-Youm, and its sister English-language website, The Independent.
