= Al-Masry Al-Youm =

Egyptian newspaper

- Typical Al-Masry Al-Youm front page.
- Type: Daily newspaper
- Format: Compact
- Owner(s): Al-Masry Al-Youm for Journalism and Publication
- Editor: Abdellatif El-Menawy
- Founded: 7 June 2004; 21 years ago
- Political alignment: Independent; Reformist; Liberal
- Headquarters: Garden City, Cairo, Egypt
- Website: almasryalyoum.com (in Arabic) almasryalyoum.com/en

Al-Masry Al-Youm (Arabic: المصري اليوم, romanized: al-Maṣrī l-Yawm, IPA: [elˈmɑsˤɾi lˈjoːm], meaning The Egyptian Today) is an Egyptian privately owned daily newspaper that was first published in June 2004. It is published in Arabic as is its website, almasryalyoum.com. An English version of the website was introduced in 2009 as the Al-masry Al-youm English Edition, which later evolved into Egypt Independent. It strives to be a full-service multimedia news organization for Egypt.

== History and profile ==
Al-Masry Al-Youm Caricature

The newspaper was founded in late 2002 by Salah Diab, an Egyptian businessman whose grandfather (Tawfik Diab) was one of Egypt's most renowned publishers in the 1930s and 1940s. Hisham Kassem is also a founder of Al Masry Al Youm. In 2004, its establishment was finalized, and on 7 June 2004, it published its first edition. The publisher of the daily is Al-Masry Al-Youm for Journalism and Publication.

Magdi El Galad is one of the former editors-in-chief of the paper. Until 3 May 2014 Mohamed Salmawi served as editor-in-chief of the daily when Ali Al Sayed was appointed to the post.

The paper has a liberal leaning. It initially circulated primarily amongst Cairo's intellectual elite, providing objective news coverage in the belief that good news would beat sensationalist reporting found in other Egyptian print media. It has been said that the paper's launch "helped inaugurate a new opening for independent media in Egypt.". After 3 three years, it was challenging Al-Ahram for the status of being the national paper of record. As of 2009 it was regarded as the most influential newspaper in Egypt.

It has successfully responded to the Egyptian media market as a whole and not a single political party, like many Egyptian opposition papers, and was unafraid to take on hard-hitting topics, like governmental news outlets. Further, it harnessed the energy of young journalists, giving them incentives to produce good work.

In 2012, the paper's online version was the 26th most-visited website in Egypt based on the Alexa data. The same year the paper sold 250,000 copies.

=== 2011 Gaza Aid Flotilla Initiative ===
In July, 2011, Al Masry Al Youm publicized its initiative to host the Freedom Flotilla II in Egypt and to have the flotilla's ships sail for Gaza from an Egyptian port. The flotilla's ships were stalled in Greece after Greek authorities refused to let them sail. The paper reported that flotilla activists welcomed the paper's initiative to sail from Egypt. The French ship Dignité Al Karama was the only ship in the flotilla that managed to approach Gaza. It turned towards Gaza after publicly announcing that its destination was the port of Alexandria, before being intercepted by Israeli commandos and escorted to the Israeli port of Ashdod. Al Masry Al Youm reported at the time that a source among the flotilla's activists said to the paper that "the ship will reach the port of Alexandria to refuel, in response to the invitation of Al Masry Al Youm, and after that it will proceed to one of the Mediterranean ports, and from there directly to Gaza, challenging all of the threats that Israel has issued."

=== Accusations of self-censorship ===
On 1 December 2011, the chief editor of Al-Masry Al-Youm objected to and ultimately censored a print issue of Egypt Independent, Al-Masry's weekly English-language newspaper supplement that was launched in November 2011. The second issue of Egypt Independent was to carry an opinion piece by Robert Springborg, a political scientist and expert on Egyptian civil-military relations, that was critical of the Supreme Council of the Armed Forces that had ruled Egypt since the February, 2011 departure of former president Husni Mubarak. Springborg and the Egypt Independent staff collaborated to alter the offending sections in the opinion piece, however the second issue of the supplement was nevertheless prevented from being published. Professor Springborg was himself accused of being a "conspirator against Egypt’s stability" on 7 December 2011 Arabic-language edition of Al-Masry al-Youm. The self-censorship episode prompted the staff of Egypt Independent to write that "even after 25 January, self-censorship still plagues Egyptian media. As an Egyptian newspaper, we, too, suffer from it. But if self-censorship becomes internalized and goes unquestioned, it becomes an irreversible practice. We refuse to let this happen."

=== Egypt Independent closure ===
Egypt Independent was closed by the parent company in April 2013. Its final print issue which was due to be published on 25 April was withheld by the owners. It was eventually made available in an online digital edition.

In June 2013, former journalists of Egypt Independent founded an online newspaper entitled Mada Masr.

== Editors ==
- Magdi Mehanna (2004)
- Anwar El Hawari (2004–2005)
- Magdi El Galad (2005–2012)
- Mohamad Samir (2012)
- Yasser Rizk (2012–2013)
- Mohamed Salmawy (2014)
- Ali Al Sayyed (2014–2015)
- Mahmoud Musallam (2015–2016)
- Mohamed El Sayed Saleh (2017–present)
