= Egyptian Initiative for Personal Rights =

Egyptian human rights organization

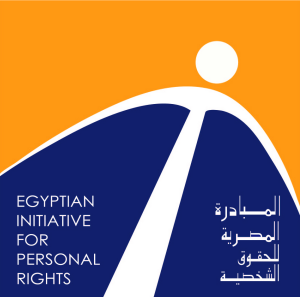
- Type: Non-profit; NGO
- Location: Cairo, Egypt
- Fields: Human rights, Advocacy
- Website: www.eipr.org/en

The Egyptian Initiative for Personal Rights or EIPR (Arabic: المبادرة المصرية للحقوق الشخصية, romanized: al-Mubādarah al-Miṣrīyah lil-Ḥuqūq al-Shakhṣīyah) is an independent Egyptian human rights organization, established in 2002. It is a Cairo-based think tank.

== Structure and leadership ==
As of November 2020, Gasser Abdel Razek was EIPR's Executive Director, Karim Ennarah was EIPR's Director of Criminal Justice and Mohammed Basheer was office manager.

== Creation and aims ==
The EIPR was created in 2002 by Hossam Bahgat.

EIPR aims to complement the work of other Egyptian human rights groups by focusing on human rights related to a person's "body, privacy and house".

=== Methods ===
The EIPR uses "research, documentation, legal aid, strategic litigation and advocacy" on issues including prison conditions during the COVID-19 pandemic in Egypt, capital punishment in Egypt, attacks against LGBT rights in Egypt, and "foreign debt and sectarian violence".

== Programs ==
As of November 2020, EIPR worked on four main programs, covering "criminal justice; civil liberties; economic and social justice; and regional and international human rights mechanisms".

== The North African Litigation Initiative ==
EIPR established its North African Litigation Initiative (NALI) in 2010 to encourage NGOs and human rights defenders from North Africa to play a more active role within the African human rights system. The aim of NALI is to pressure North African governments to promote and protect the rights defined in the African Charter.

NALI provides technical and financial assistance to North African NGOs and human rights defenders who wish to litigate using the African human rights system, especially the African Commission on Human and Peoples' Rights.

== Arrests of employees ==
=== November 2020 ===
On 15 November 2020, the home of EIPR office manager Mohammed Basheer in Cairo was raided and he was detained by Egyptian security forces. Gasser Abdel Razek, EIPR's Executive Director, interpreted the raid and detention as a response to European diplomats meeting with EIPR staff at the EIPR headquarters earlier in November. Razek stated, "The extreme sensitivity displayed in dealing with the visit is the bigger confession of how bad the human rights situation is in Egypt. ... We are dealing with new kinds of rights violations which were not present five or 10 years ago."

EIPR Director of Criminal Justice, Karim Ennarah, was detained on 18 November in Dahab. Executive director Gasser Abdel Razek was detained on 19 November at his home in Cairo.

On 27 November 2020, the UN human rights experts called upon the Egyptian authorities to “immediately and unconditionally” release the three detained EIPR employees.

=== December 2020 ===
On 3 December 2020, Abdel Razek, Ennarah, and Basheer, who were detained at Cairo's Tora Prison, were released on bail after an international outcry from prominent Western politicians and actors including Scarlett Johansson, and Antony Blinken. On December 7, however, a court extended the detention of Patrick Zaki, a researcher for EIPR who is also a student at an Italian university.

On 18 December 2020, the European Parliament passed a resolution, citing what it perceived to be a deteriorating human rights situation in Egypt. Approved with 434 votes, the resolution urged the member states to impose targeted restrictions against Egypt, particularly regarding its detention of the EIPR employees. However, the Egyptian Senate and House of Representatives condemned the resolution, describing it as being politically motivated.

== See also ==
- Human rights in Egypt
