= Abdelnasser Gohary =

Egyptian poet (born 1970)

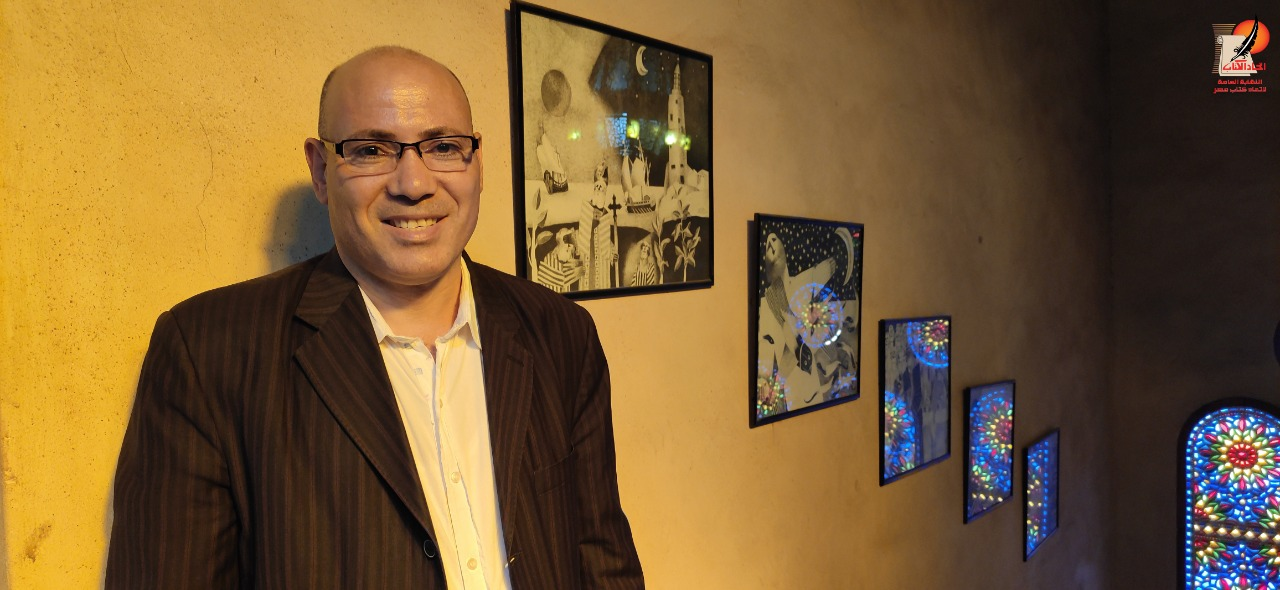
- Native name: عبد الناصر الجوهري
- Born: 28 July 1970 (age 55) Egypt
- Occupation: Poet
- Language: Arabic
- Education: BA in law

Website
- www.facebook.com/gohary121

Abdelnasser El-Gohary, (born 1970, Dakahlia) is an Egyptian poet. He received several awards, the most recent of which was the Classical Poetry Award from the Egyptian Writers Union in 2016. He is also a member of the Board of Directors of the Egyptian Writers Union in 2018/2020, hosted by the Sino-Arab Forum - the first session - Creativity on the New Silk Road in Cairo - 2018.

== Career ==
Abdelnasser Ahmed El-Gohary Mohamed was born in Dakahlia Governorate, Egypt on July 28, 1970. He studied at Mansoura University and obtained a Bachelor of Laws in 2017. He is a member of the General Syndicate of the Egyptian Writers Union, the Writers Association, a member of the Cairo Atelier, and the World Islamic Literature Association, and he is a central lecturer at the General Authority for Cultural Palaces in Egypt. The General Authority for Culture Palaces included it in the Dictionary of Writers in 2004, and it was among the poets who were included in the Directory of the Egyptian Writers Union in 2006, and it was also included in the Great Encyclopedia of Arab Poets in Morocco in 2016, from contemporary poets who were included in the Al-Babtain Dictionary of Contemporary Arab Poets in its third edition - The eighth volume in 2014 AD - Kuwait, and he has more than fifteen poetry collections, including the collection "A cry that does not dry up" issued by the Egyptian General Book Authority in 2015. Culture in 2003 and "In the Waq Waq" for the literature series of the masses.

El-Gohary participated in poetry competitions and won many prizes, including the Classical Poetry Prize in the East Delta Cultural Region Competition in Egypt in 2000, the Central Literary Prize for the General Authority for Cultural Palaces in Egypt in 2005, the Writers Association Prize in Cairo in 2005, and the Emirates Heritage Club Prize in 2003, The Fusha Poetry Award from the Egyptian Writers Union in 2016, and other awards. He was also chosen among the 35 best poets in the Arab world in the UAE "Prince of Poets" competition in 2008. In his poems, El-Gohary touches on many topics, including love and dreamy romance, such as his poem "A Rose as a Discourse", and resistance poetry and inspiration for the inheritance, where he talks about the homeland and love The homeland is like his poem "Poetry is the Memory of Anger," as well as about the issues and concerns of Arab poetry.

== Literary works ==
=== Poems ===
- Fossils may indicate you
- Poetry is the memory of anger
- Space of my canned space
- Scary fantasy what scares crows
- Reveal
- Love is before me
- I am the little sea poet
- What now do I call you
- Who are you wasting my sadness?
- Did the doves flock returned?
- Be afraid of the temptation of the tired
- If the eyes of the night fall asleep
- What is ours shall not be yours

=== Poetry collections ===
Title	Language	Publisher	Year	Pages	ISBN	OCLC Number
At the gate of beauty girl	Arabic	Dar Yastorun for printing, publishing and distribution	2016	273	ISBN 9789777761697, 9777761694	948845501
A cry that does not dry up	Arabic	Egyptian General Book Authority	2014	243	ISBN 9789779100463, 9779100466	910086888
Talk of innocence	Arabic	Dar Yastorun for printing, publishing and distribution	2016	219	ISBN 9789777761680, 9777761686	951885251
The clown can't laugh	Arabic		2007			1126598102
Sadness assassinates spring	Arabic		2007			745407156
Beads of moon tears	Arabic		2007			745407159
Do not worry	Arabic					745407160
Who are you wasting my sadness for?!	Arabic					745411267
From the leaves of nostalgia	Arabic	Egyptian General Book Authority	2022	205	ISBN 9789779129235, 9779129235	1320814990
Mummy for someone who looks like me	Arabic	Dar Yastorun for printing, publishing and distribution	2021	224		1320816076
Wretched crushed by longing	Arabic		2007			
What now do I call you?	Arabic		2008			
A lawsuit has not yet been filed	Arabic	Dar Al Emad for Publishing and Distribution	2015			
I promise not to love you	Arabic	Dar Yastorun for printing, publishing and distribution	2016			
Isthmus worthy of love	Arabic	Dar Yastorun for printing, publishing and distribution	2016			
Buried alive can't scream	Arabic	Egyptian General Book Authority	2017			
A hermit in the sanctuary of poetry	Arabic		2008			
Standard Arabic in Egypt	Arabic	Dar Yastorun for printing, publishing and distribution	2015			
Home poem	Arabic	Dar Yastorun for printing, publishing and distribution	2019			

=== Poetic plays ===
- The sun is picking up its sleeves
- In the Waq Waq

=== Book in criticism ===
- Pens flying in the sky of the homeland

== Prizes ==
- Standard Arabic Poetry Prize in the East Delta Cultural Competition, 2000
- Standard Arabic Poetry Prize in the Literary Competition of Al-Nasr Military Magazine, 2001
- Literary competition prize held by the General Administration of Women's Culture of the General Authority for Cultural Palaces in classical poetry, 2003
- Emirates Heritage Club Award, 2003
- Central Literary Award, Diwan Branch, Classical Poetry, General Authority for Cultural Palaces, 2005
- Prize of the Literary and Artistic Competition of the Dakahlia Culture Branch, Eloquent Poetry, 2005
- The prize for the cultural competition held by the General Administration of Social and Cultural Clubs in classical poetry, 2005
- Literary competition prize held by Saad Zagloul Cultural Center in the seventh session, 2006
- Literary Disciple Award, 2007
- Best 35 poets award in the Arab world, Prince of Poets competition, 2008
- Knight Poets Award, Poet Al-Rasoul Satellite Channel, UAE, 2010
- Standard Arabic Poetry Award from the Egyptian Writers Union, 2016

== See also ==
- Mohammad Najib Abdallah
