= Nuha Hamd Abd Al Karim =

Egyptian writer

- Occupation: College professor
- Notable work: "Decision-making in educational policy" "actors and mechanisms"

Nuha Hamd Abd Al Karim, Egyptian writer and author. She works as an assistant professor of pedagogy, and director of the Educational Services Center at the Institute of Educational Studies at Cairo University in Egypt. She is the author of several books, most notably “Decision-Making in Education Policy” Actors and Mechanisms.

== Biography ==
The Egyptian doctor, writer and author, Nuha Hamd Abd Al Karim, was born in Egypt, and she is currently working as an assistant professor of pedagogy, and director of the Educational Services Center at the Institute of Educational Studies at Cairo University in Egypt. She is the author of several books and research, most notably "Decision-making in educational policy" actors and mechanisms. Nuha Hamd Abd Al Karim writes on several topics, most notably educational issues. She has a research paper entitled "Decision-making in educational policy" actors and mechanisms, which aims to study how to develop the educational policy-making process in Egypt so that it takes place on a democratic and practical basis in light of the experience of the United States in this field.

== Books ==
- Decision-making in educational policy “actors and mechanisms”.
- Educational accountability as an entry point for evaluating the performance of a university faculty member.
- The political culture of illiterate women and those free from illiteracy: a field study.
- The role of education in confronting terrorism.
- Human rights education in Arab universities and its relationship to students' human development.
- The life skills needed for adult learners in the post-literacy stage.
- Excellence for all or excellence for talented students.
- The educational policy-making process in the United States of America.
- The sixth row between the decision to cancel and the decision to return.
- Integrating the talented as an approach to achieving excellence for all.
- The educational policy-making process in the United States and the Arab Republic of Egypt: a comparative study.
