= 1913 =

1913 in various calendars
- Gregorian calendar: 1913; MCMXIII
- Ab urbe condita: 2666
- Armenian calendar: 1362; ԹՎ ՌՅԿԲ
- Assyrian calendar: 6663
- Baháʼí calendar: 69–70
- Balinese saka calendar: 1834–1835
- Bengali calendar: 1319–1320
- Berber calendar: 2863
- British Regnal year: 3 Geo. 5 – 4 Geo. 5
- Buddhist calendar: 2457
- Burmese calendar: 1275
- Byzantine calendar: 7421–7422
- Chinese calendar: 壬子年 (Water Rat); 4610 or 4403 — to — 癸丑年 (Water Ox); 4611 or 4404
- Coptic calendar: 1629–1630
- Discordian calendar: 3079
- Ethiopian calendar: 1905–1906
- Hebrew calendar: 5673–5674
- Hindu calendars
- Vikram Samvat: 1969–1970
- Shaka Samvat: 1834–1835
- Kali Yuga: 5013–5014
- Holocene calendar: 11913
- Igbo calendar: 913–914
- Iranian calendar: 1291–1292
- Islamic calendar: 1331–1332
- Japanese calendar: Taishō 2 (大正２年)
- Javanese calendar: 1842–1843
- Juche calendar: 2
- Julian calendar: Gregorian minus 13 days
- Korean calendar: 4246
- Minguo calendar: ROC 2 民國2年
- Nanakshahi calendar: 445
- Thai solar calendar: 2455–2456
- Tibetan calendar: ཆུ་ཕོ་བྱི་བ་ལོ་ (male Water-Rat); 2039 or 1658 or 886 — to — ཆུ་མོ་གླང་ལོ་ (female Water-Ox); 2040 or 1659 or 887

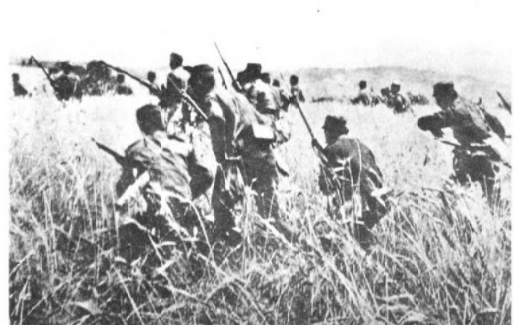
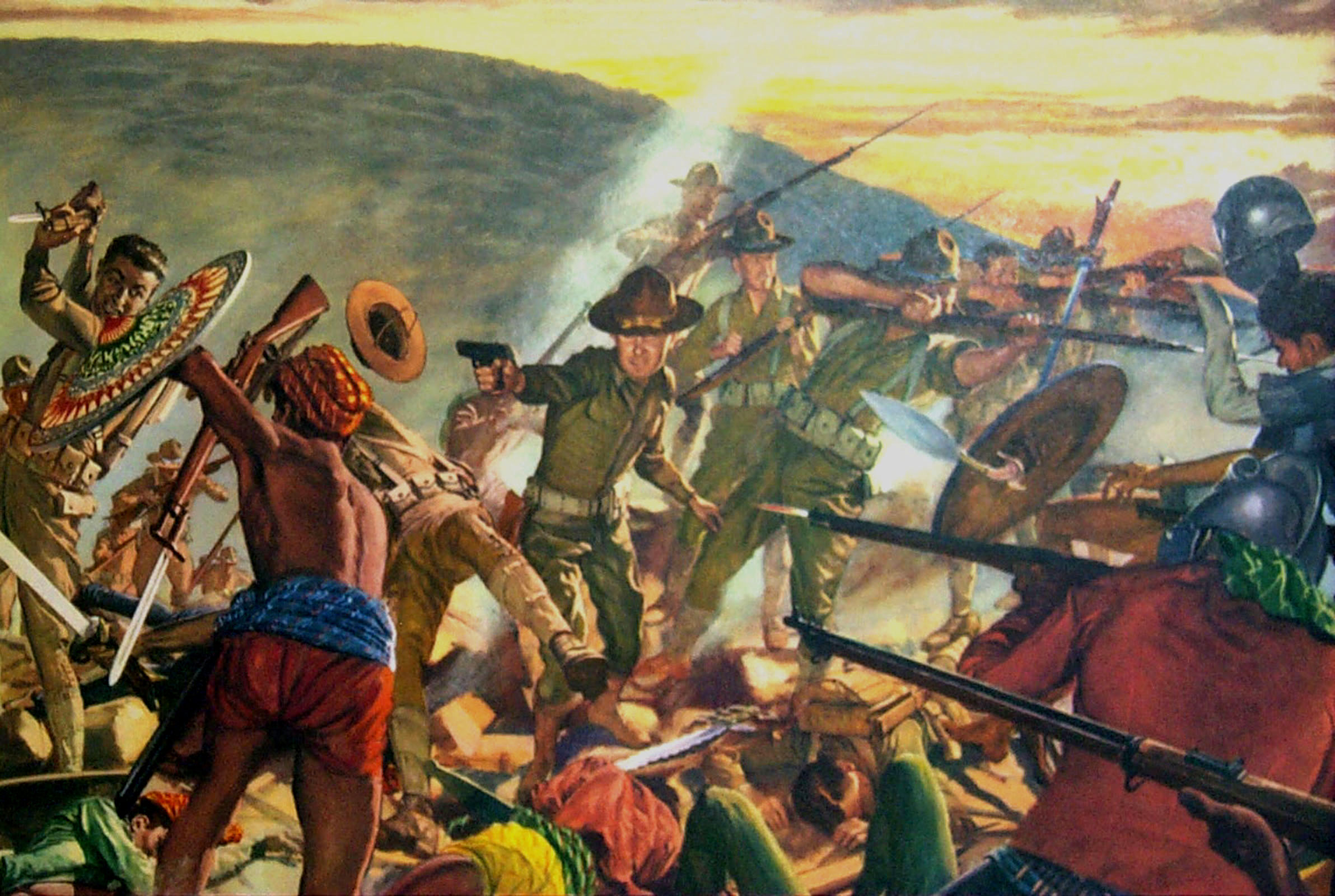
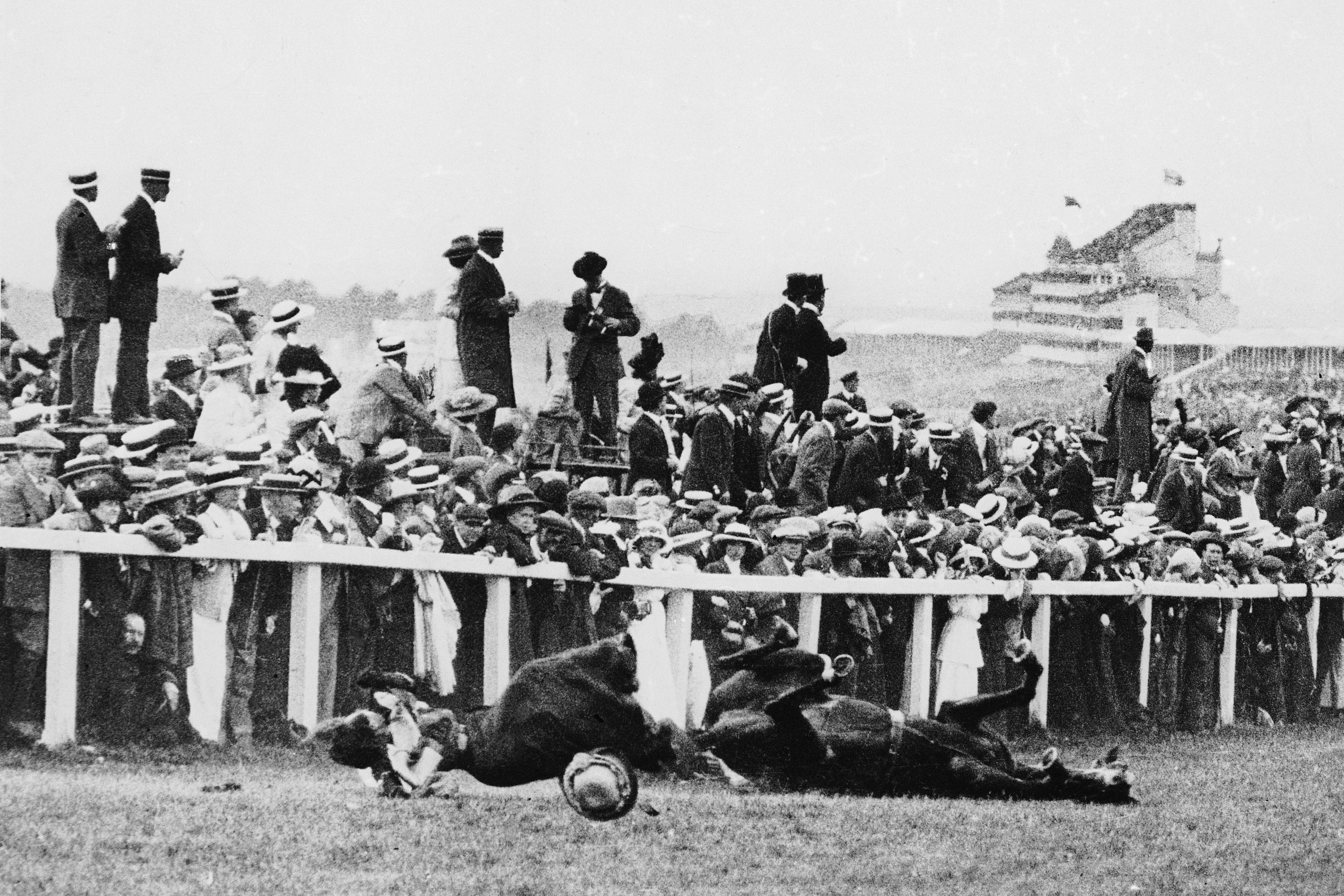
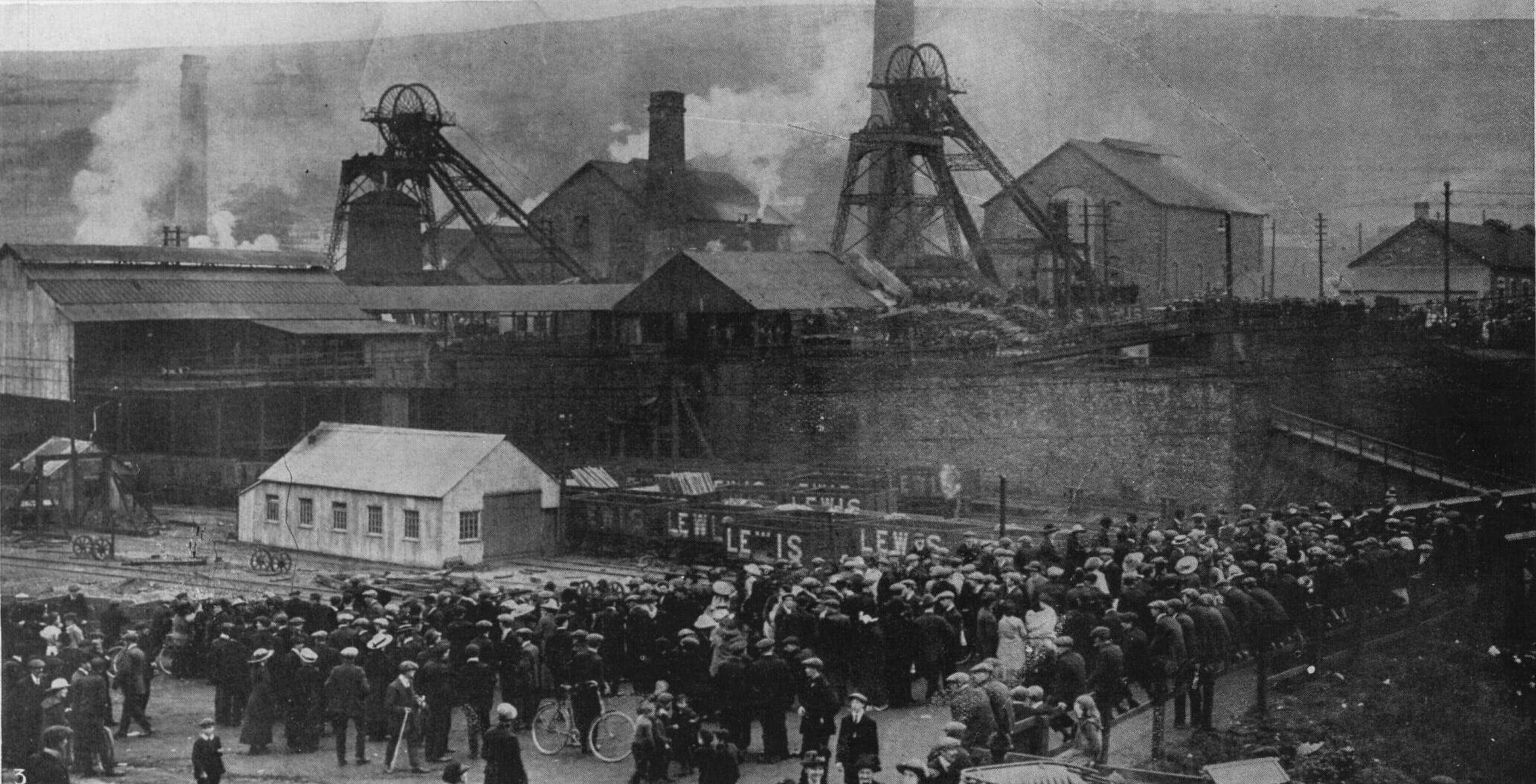
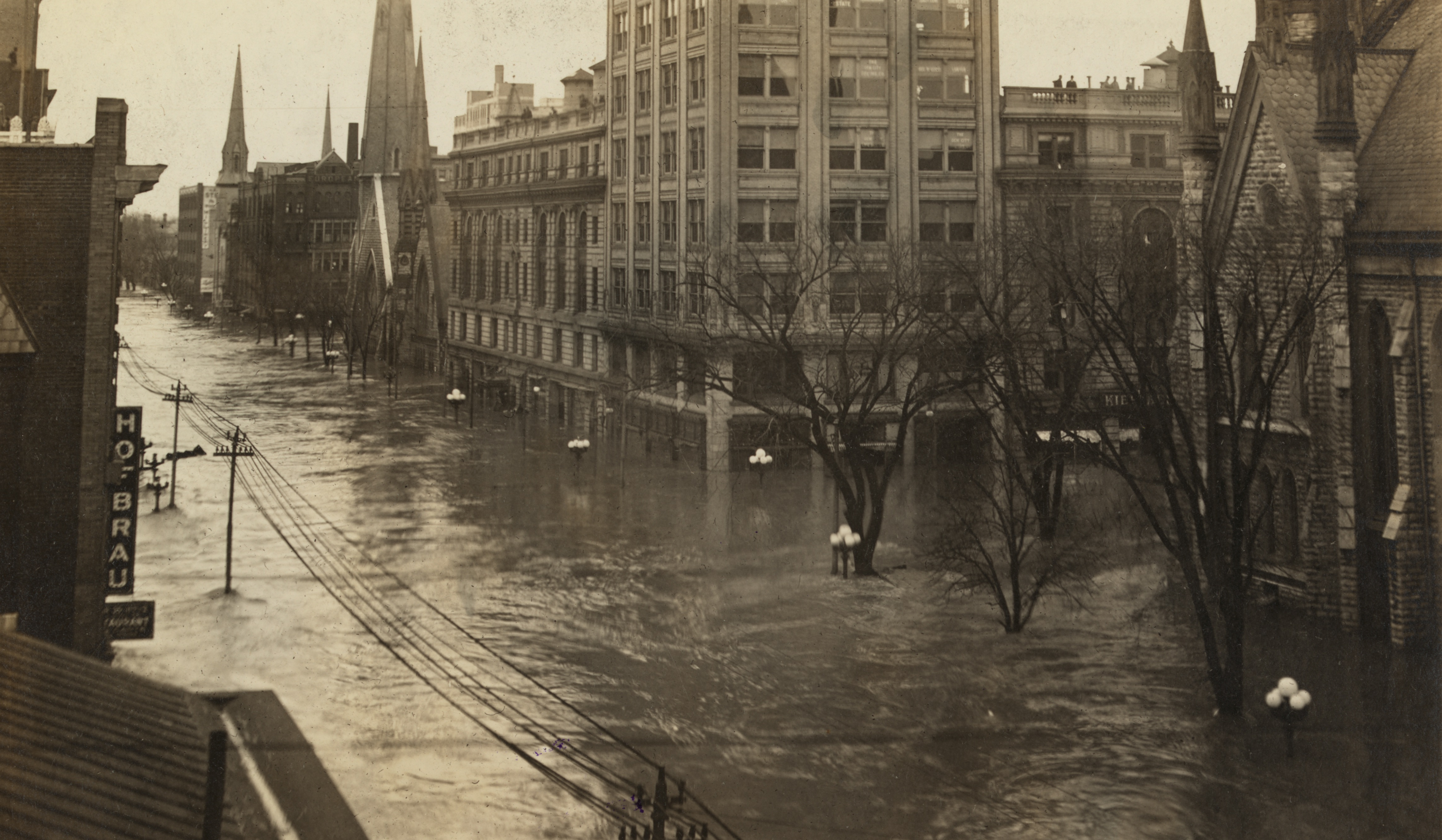
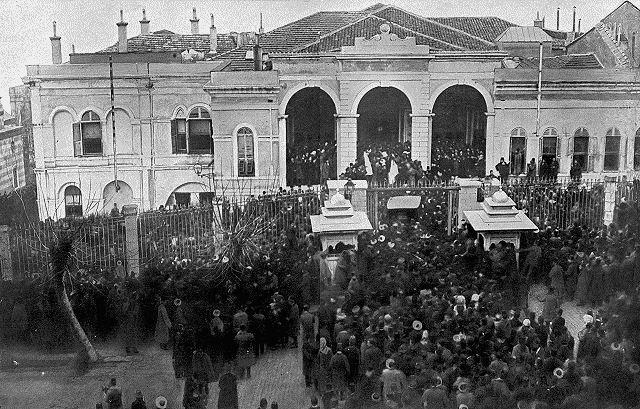
From top to bottom, left to right:
- The Second Balkan War sees former allies fight over territory, escalating tensions in Southeast Europe;
- The Battle of Bud Bagsak ends the Moro Rebellion as U.S. forces defeat Moro fighters in the southern Philippines;
- At the Epsom Derby, suffragette Emily Davison is fatally struck by King George V's horse, drawing global attention to women's rights;
- The Senghenydd colliery disaster kills 440 miners in Wales, Britain’s worst mining tragedy;
- The Great Flood of 1913 devastates the American Midwest, killing hundreds and causing massive damage;
- The 1913 Ottoman coup d'état places the Committee of Union and Progress in power, consolidating control under the Three Pashas.

1913 (MCMXIII) was a common year starting on Wednesday of the Gregorian calendar and a common year starting on Tuesday of the Julian calendar, the 1913th year of the Common Era (CE) and Anno Domini (AD) designations, the 913th year of the 2nd millennium, the 13th year of the 20th century, and the 4th year of the 1910s decade. As of the start of 1913, the Gregorian calendar was 13 days ahead of the Julian calendar, which remained in localized use until 1923.

== Events ==
=== January ===
- January – Joseph Stalin travels to Vienna to research his Marxism and the National Question. This means that, during this month, Stalin, Hitler, Trotsky and Tito are all living in the city, as also are Freud and Jung.
- January 3 – First Balkan War: Greece completes its capture of the eastern Aegean island of Chios, as the last Ottoman forces on the island surrender.
- January 13 – Edward Carson founds the Ulster Volunteer Force, by unifying several existing loyalist militias to resist home rule for Ireland.
- January 18 – First Balkan War: Battle of Lemnos – Greek admiral Pavlos Kountouriotis forces the Turkish fleet to retreat to its base within the Dardanelles, from which it will not venture for the rest of the war.
- January 23 – 1913 Ottoman coup d'état: Enver Pasha comes to power.

=== February ===
- February 1 – New York City's Grand Central Terminal, having been rebuilt, reopens as the world's largest railroad station.
- February 3 – The Sixteenth Amendment to the United States Constitution is ratified, authorizing the Federal government to impose and collect income taxes on all sources of income.
- February 9 – Mexican Revolution: "La Decena Trágica", the rebellion of some military chiefs against the President Francisco I. Madero, begins.
- February 13 – Thubten Gyatso, the 13th Dalai Lama, declares the independence of Tibet from Qing dynasty China.
- February 18 – Mexican Revolution: President Francisco I. Madero and Vice President José María Pino Suárez are forced to resign.
- February 19 – Mexican Revolution: With Madero and Pino Suárez removed, Pedro Lascuráin serves as President for less than an hour, before General Victoriano Huerta, leader of the coup, takes office.
- February 20 – W. Meissner published a journal about discovering the first Wieferich prime, which is the number 1093.
- February 22 – Mexican Revolution: Francisco I. Madero and José María Pino Suárez are assassinated.
- February 23 – Joseph Stalin is arrested by the Russian secret police, the Okhrana, in Petrograd, and exiled to Siberia.

=== March ===
- March
  - The House of Romanov celebrates the 300th anniversary of its succession to the throne, amidst an outpouring of monarchist sentiment in Russia.
  - Following the assassination of his rival Song Jiaoren, Yuan Shikai uses military force to dissolve China's parliament, and rules as a dictator.
- c. March 1 – British steamship Calvados disappears in the Sea of Marmara, with 200 on board.
- March 3 – The Woman Suffrage Procession takes place in Washington, D.C. led by Inez Milholland on horseback.
- March 4 – The U.S. Department of Commerce and U.S. Department of Labor are established, by splitting the duties of the 10-year-old Department of Commerce and Labor. The Census Bureau, U.S. Bureau of Fisheries and U.S. Coast and Geodetic Survey form part of the Department of Commerce.
- March 4–6 – First Balkan War: Battle of Bizani – Forces of the Kingdom of Greece capture the forts of Bizani (covering the approaches to Ioannina) from the Ottoman Empire.
- March 7 – Alum Chine explosion: British freighter Alum Chine, carrying 343 tons of dynamite, explodes in the harbour of Baltimore, Maryland.
- March 13 – Mexican Revolution: Pancho Villa returns to Mexico from his self-imposed exile in the United States.
- March 17 – The Military Aviation Academy (Escuela de Aviación Militar) is founded in Uruguay, to become the Military Air Force (Fuerza Aérea Militar) on 4 December 1952 (the Uruguayan Air Force (FAU) will grow from this foundation).
- March 18 – King George I of Greece is assassinated after 50 years on the throne; he is succeeded by his son Constantine I.
- March 20
  - Sung Chiao-jen, a founder of the Chinese nationalist party (Kuomintang), is wounded in an assassination attempt, and dies two days later.
  - The city of Canberra, the centre of the Australian Capital Territory, becomes the official capital of the Commonwealth of Australia.
- March 23 – Supporters of Phan Xích Long begin a revolt against colonial rule in French Indochina.
- March 25 – The Great Dayton Flood, after four days of rain in the Miami Valley, kills over 360 and destroys 20,000 homes (chiefly in Dayton, Ohio).
- March 26
  - Mexican Revolution: Venustiano Carranza announces his Plan of Guadalupe, and begins his rebellion against Victoriano Huerta's government, as head of the Constitutionals.
  - Balkan Wars: The Siege of Adrianople ends, when Bulgarian forces take Adrianople from the Ottomans.

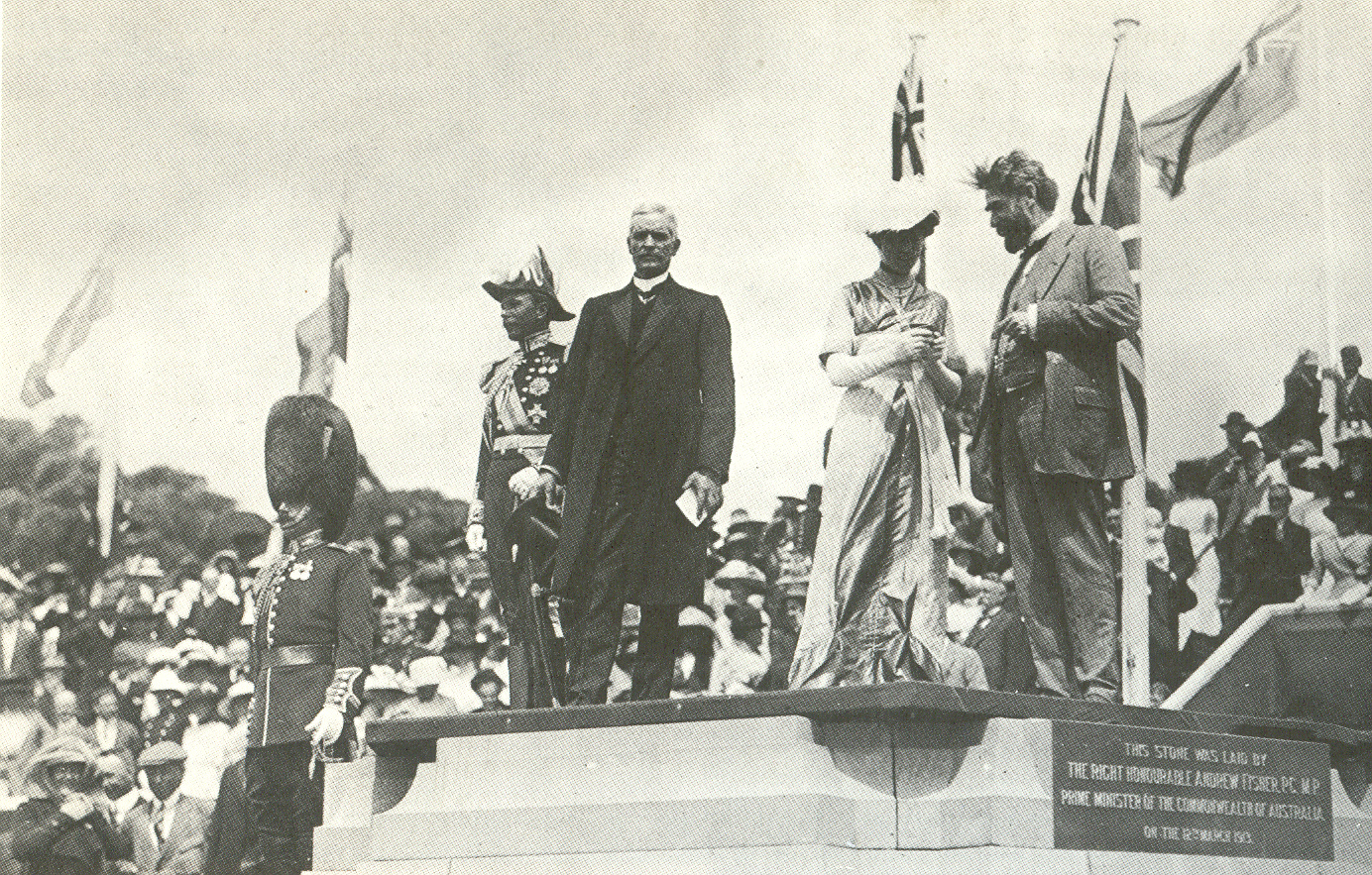
March 12: Australia begins building the new capital of Canberra.

=== April ===
- April 5 – The United States Soccer Federation is formed.
- April 8 – The Seventeenth Amendment to the United States Constitution is passed, dictating the direct election of senators.
- April 21 – Cunard ocean liner RMS Aquitania, built by John Brown & Company, is launched on the River Clyde.
- April 24 – The Woolworth Building opens in New York City. Designed by Cass Gilbert, it is the tallest building in the world on this date, and for more than a decade after.

=== May ===
- May 3 – Raja Harishchandra, the first full-length Indian feature film, is released, marking the beginning of the Indian film industry.
- May 9–July 11 – A major industrial strike occurs in the Black Country of England, involving 25,000 workers, and threatening preparations for World War I in naval and steel industries. The workers demand 23 shillings minimum wage.
- May 14 – New York Governor William Sulzer approves the charter for the Rockefeller Foundation, which begins operations with a $100,000,000 donation from John D. Rockefeller.
- May 24–25 – Adolf Hitler moves from Vienna to Munich.
- May 24 – Princess Victoria Louise of Prussia marries Prince Ernest Augustus of Hanover in Berlin, ending the decades-long rift between the Houses of Hohenzollern and Hanover and marking the last great gathering of European sovereigns.
- May 26 (May 13 O.S.) – Igor Sikorsky becomes the first person to pilot a 4-engine fixed-wing aircraft.
- May 29 – The ballet The Rite of Spring (music by Igor Stravinsky, conducted by Pierre Monteux, choreography by Vaslav Nijinsky and design by Nicholas Roerich) is premiered by Sergei Diaghilev's Ballets Russes, at the Théâtre des Champs-Élysées in Paris; its modernist style provokes one of the most famous classical music riots in history. The audience includes Gabriele D'Annunzio, Coco Chanel, Marcel Duchamp, Harry Graf Kessler and Maurice Ravel.
- May 30 – First Balkan War: The Treaty of London is signed, ending the war. Greece is granted those parts of southern Epirus which it does not already control, and the independence of Albania is recognised.

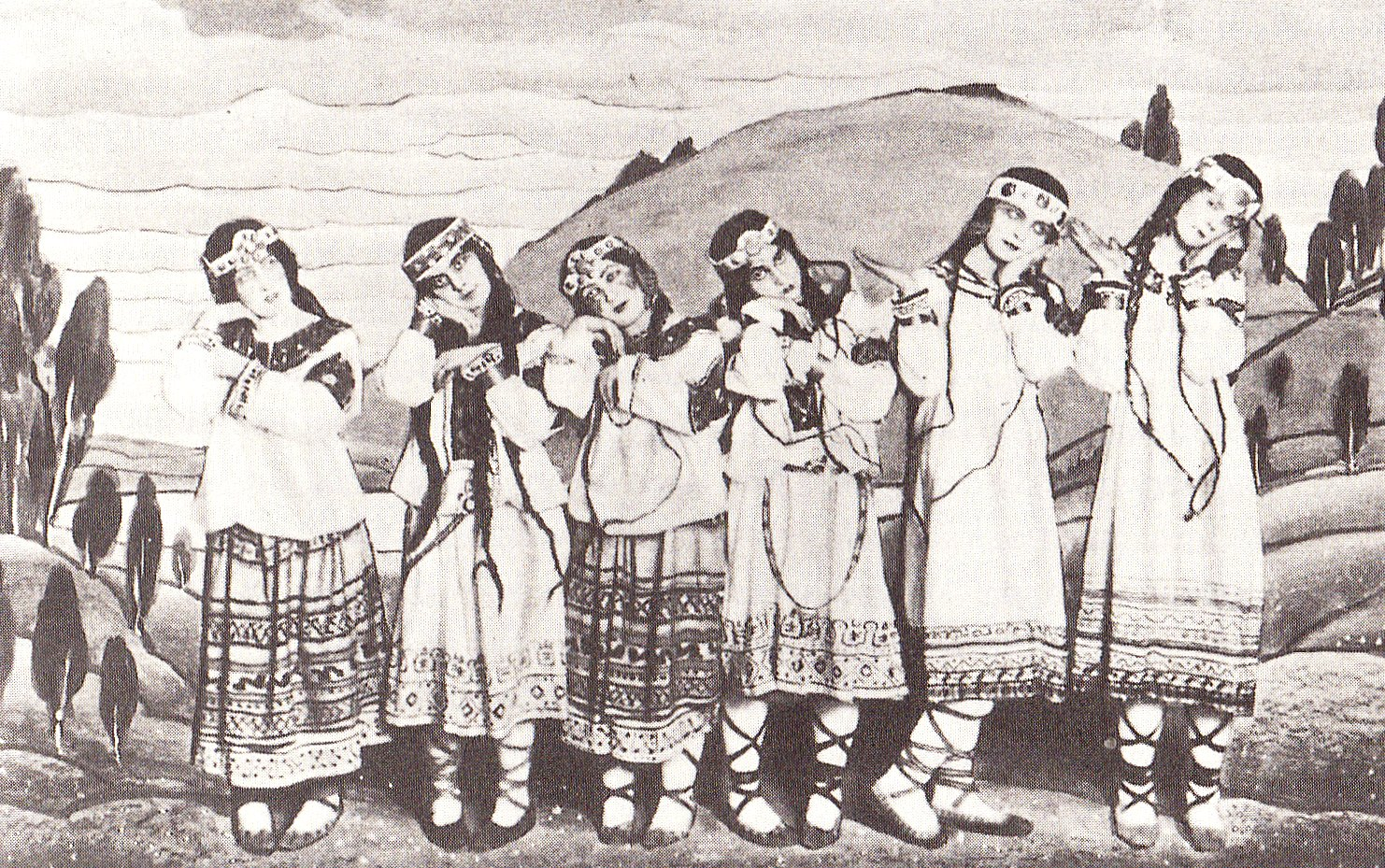
May 29: The Rite of Spring is premiered in Paris.

=== June ===
- June 1 – The Greek–Serbian Treaty of Alliance is signed, paving the way for the Second Balkan War.
- June 4 – Emily Davison, a British suffragette, runs out in front of the King's horse, Anmer, at The Derby. She is trampled and dies four days later in hospital, never having regained consciousness.
- June 11 – Battle of Bud Bagsak: Armed with guns and heavy artillery, U.S. and Philippine troops under General John J. "Black Jack" Pershing fight a four-day battle against 500 Moro rebels, who are armed mostly with kampilan swords. The rebels are killed in a final desperate charge on June 15.
- June 18 – The Arab Congress of 1913 opens, during which Arab nationalists meet to discuss desired reforms under the Ottoman Empire.
- June 19 – The Parliament of South Africa passes the Natives Land Act, limiting land ownership for blacks to black territories.
- June 13 – The predecessor of the Aldi store chain opens in Essen, Germany.
- June 29 – The Second Balkan War begins with Bulgaria attacking Serbia and Greece.

=== July ===
- July 10
  - Romania declares war on Bulgaria.
  - Death Valley, California hits 134 °F (~56.7 °C), the all-time highest temperature recorded on Earth (although its validity has been challenged, and in 2020 a temperature of 54.4 °C (129.9 °F) was recorded at the same location, which would make it the world's highest verified air temperature, subject to confirmation).
- July 13 – The 1913 Romanian Army cholera outbreak during the Second Balkan War starts.
- July 27 – The town of San Javier, Uruguay, is founded by Russian settlers.

=== August ===
- August 2 – The first known ascent of Mount Olympus in Greece is made by Swiss mountaineers Daniel Baud-Bovy and Frédéric Boissonnas guided by Christos Kakkalos.
- August 4 – Republic of China: The city of Chongqing (Chungking) declares independence; Republican forces crush the rebellion in a couple of weeks.
- August 10 – Second Balkan War: The Treaty of Bucharest is signed, ending the war. Macedonia is divided, and Northern Epirus is assigned to Albania.
- August 13 – Harry Brearley invents stainless steel in Sheffield.
- August 20 – After his airplane fails at an altitude of 900 feet (270 m), aviator Adolphe Pégoud becomes the first person to bail out from an airplane and land safely.
- August 23 – The Little Mermaid statue is finished in Copenhagen, Denmark.
- August 31 – Dublin Lock-out: "Bloody Sunday": The dispute escalates when the Dublin Metropolitan Police kill one demonstrator and injure 400, in dispersing a demonstration.

=== September ===
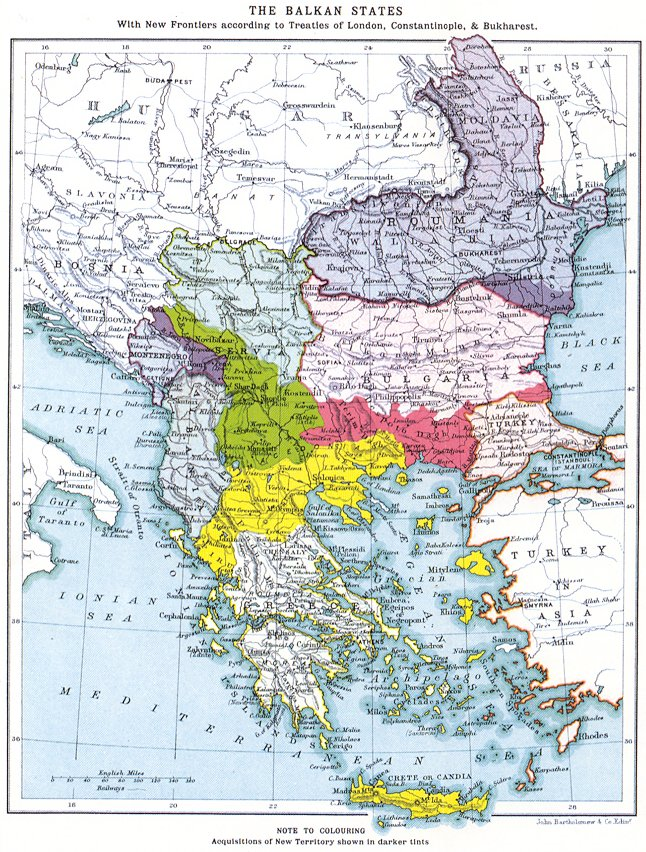
The Balkan boundaries after 1913

- September 7–8 – The Fourth Congress of the International Psychoanalytical Association (the last occasion on which Carl Jung and Sigmund Freud will meet) takes place in Munich.
- September 9
  - In Germany, BASF starts the world's first plant for the production of fertilizer based on the Haber-Bosch process.
  - Imperial Russian Army pilot Pyotr Nesterov becomes the first person to loop an airplane, flying a Nieuport IV monoplane over Syretzk Aerodrome near Kiev.
  - Helgoland Island air disaster: The first fatalities aboard a German airship occur, when the Imperial German Navy Zeppelin dirigible LZ 14 is forced down into the North Sea off Heligoland during a thunderstorm, killing 16 of the 22 men on board.
- September 10 – Jean Sibelius's tone poem Luonnotar is premiered in Gloucester Cathedral, England, with soprano Aino Ackté.
- September 17 – In Chicago, the Anti-Defamation League of B'nai B'rith is founded, with Sigmund Livingston as its first president.
- September 23 – French aviator Roland Garros crosses the Mediterranean in an airplane flying from Fréjus, France to Bizerte, Tunisia.
- September 29 – Second Balkan War: The Treaty of Constantinople is signed in Istanbul, between the Ottoman Empire and the Kingdom of Bulgaria.

=== October ===
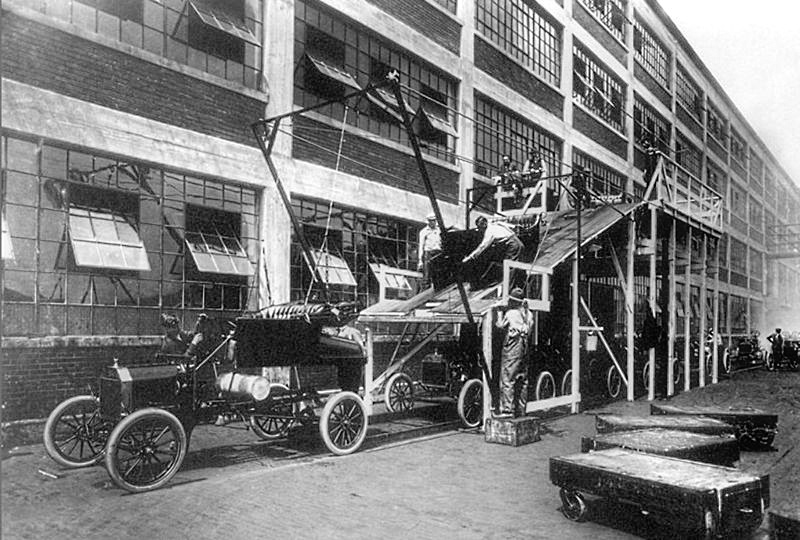
Nearly-completed Ford Model Ts at the Highland Park Plant

- October 1 – Mexican Revolution: Pancho Villa's troops take Torreón after a 3-day battle, when government troops retreat.
- October 7–December 1 – The Ford Motor Company adopts a moving assembly line for chassis production, reducing assembly time from 12½ hours to 2 hours 40 minutes, a landmark in mass production.
- October 9 – Canadian-owned ocean liner SS Volturno (1906), carrying passengers (mostly immigrants) and a chemical cargo from Rotterdam to New York City, catches fire in a North Atlantic gale; 136 die, but 521 are saved by ships summoned by SOS messages to the scene.
- October 10
  - U.S. President Woodrow Wilson triggers the explosion of the Gamboa Dike, ending construction on the Panama Canal.
  - Yuan Shikai is elected President of the Republic of China.
- October 14 – Senghenydd colliery disaster: An explosion at the Universal Colliery, Senghenydd in South Wales kills 439 miners, the worst mining accident in the United Kingdom.
- October 16 – The British Royal Navy's HMS Queen Elizabeth is launched at Portsmouth Dockyard as the first oil-fired battleship.

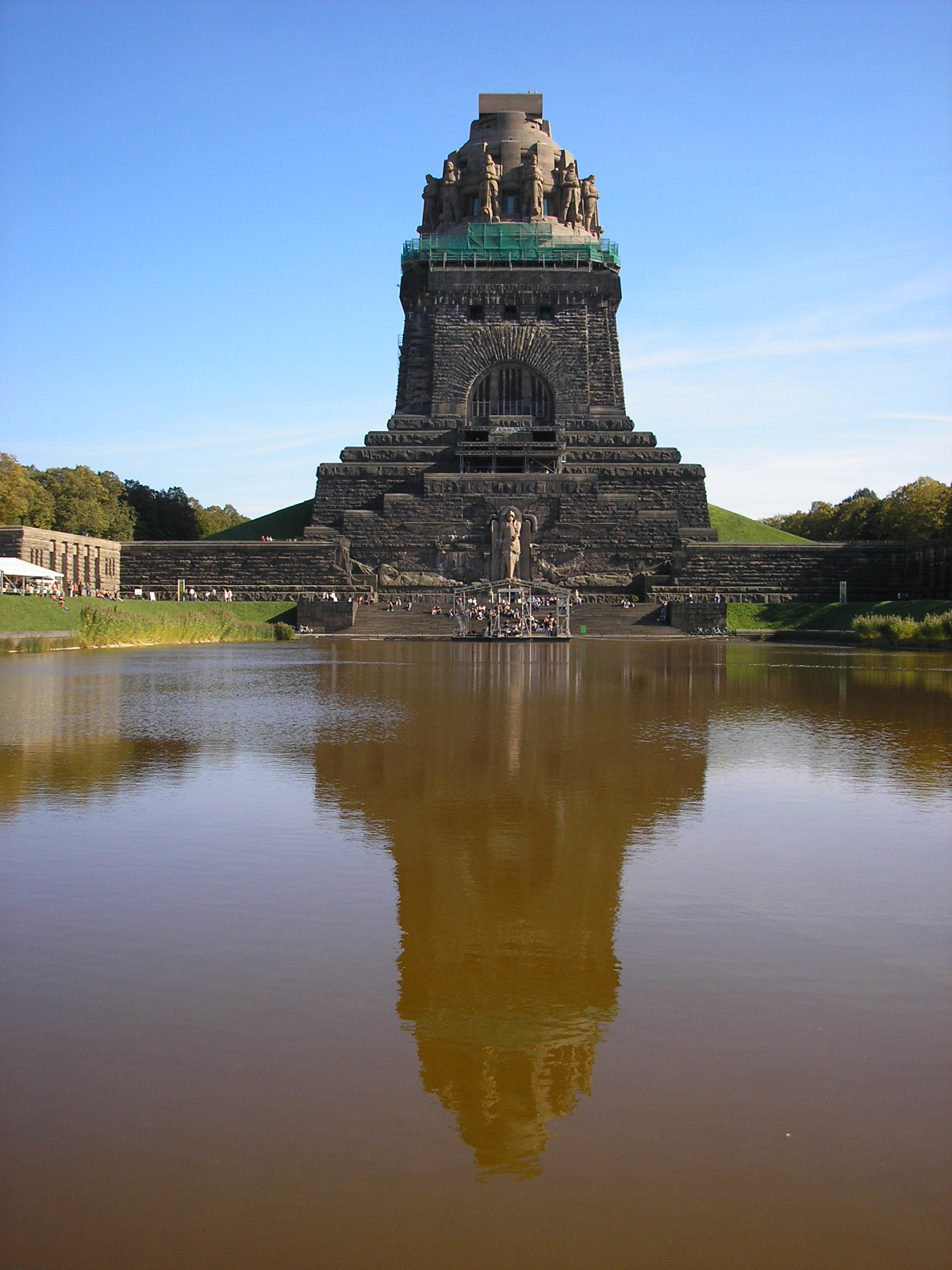
Monument to the Battle of the Nations at Leipzig

- October 18 – The Monument to the Battle of the Nations at Leipzig, Germany is finished.
- October 31 – The Lincoln Highway, the first automobile road across the United States, is dedicated.

=== November ===
- November 5 – King Otto of Bavaria is deposed by his cousin, Prince Regent Ludwig, who assumes the title Ludwig III.
- November 6 – Mohandas Gandhi is arrested, while leading a march of Indian miners in South Africa.
- November 7–11 – The Great Lakes Storm of 1913 in North America claims 19 ships, and more than 250 lives.

=== December ===
- December 1
  - Crete, having obtained self rule from Turkey after the First Balkan War, is annexed by Greece.
  - Buenos Aires Underground, the first in South America, opens.
- December 12 – Vincenzo Peruggia tries to sell the Mona Lisa in Florence, and is arrested.
- December 23 – The Federal Reserve System is created as the central banking system of the United States, by Woodrow Wilson's signature of the Federal Reserve Act.
- December 24 – Italian Hall disaster: seventy-three people – mostly striking mine workers and their families – are crushed to death in a stampede in Calumet, Michigan.
- December 25 – Disfellowshipped Adventist lay preacher Felix Manalo begins the new religious movement known as the Iglesia ni Cristo with the baptism of its first members.
- December 30 – Italy returns the Mona Lisa to France.

=== Date unknown ===
- Between the two Balkan Wars, a group of Bulgarian teachers and priests including teacher Gligor Zisov are deported by the newly established Greek authorities to Bulgaria but killed by Greek soldiers.
- The Ahmadiyya Muslim Community is established in Bengal Province (modern-day Bangladesh).
- French physicist Georges Sagnac shows that light propagates at a speed independent of the speed of its source.
- Camel cigarettes are introduced by R. J. Reynolds in the United States (the first packaged cigarettes).
- The State Security Investigations Service, the Middle East's first internal security service, is established in Egypt.
- Prada is established as a leather goods dealer in Milan, by Mario Prada and his brother.
- Astra, a predecessor of the AstraZeneca global healthcare and pharmaceutical brand, is founded in Södertälje, Sweden.

== Births ==
=== January ===
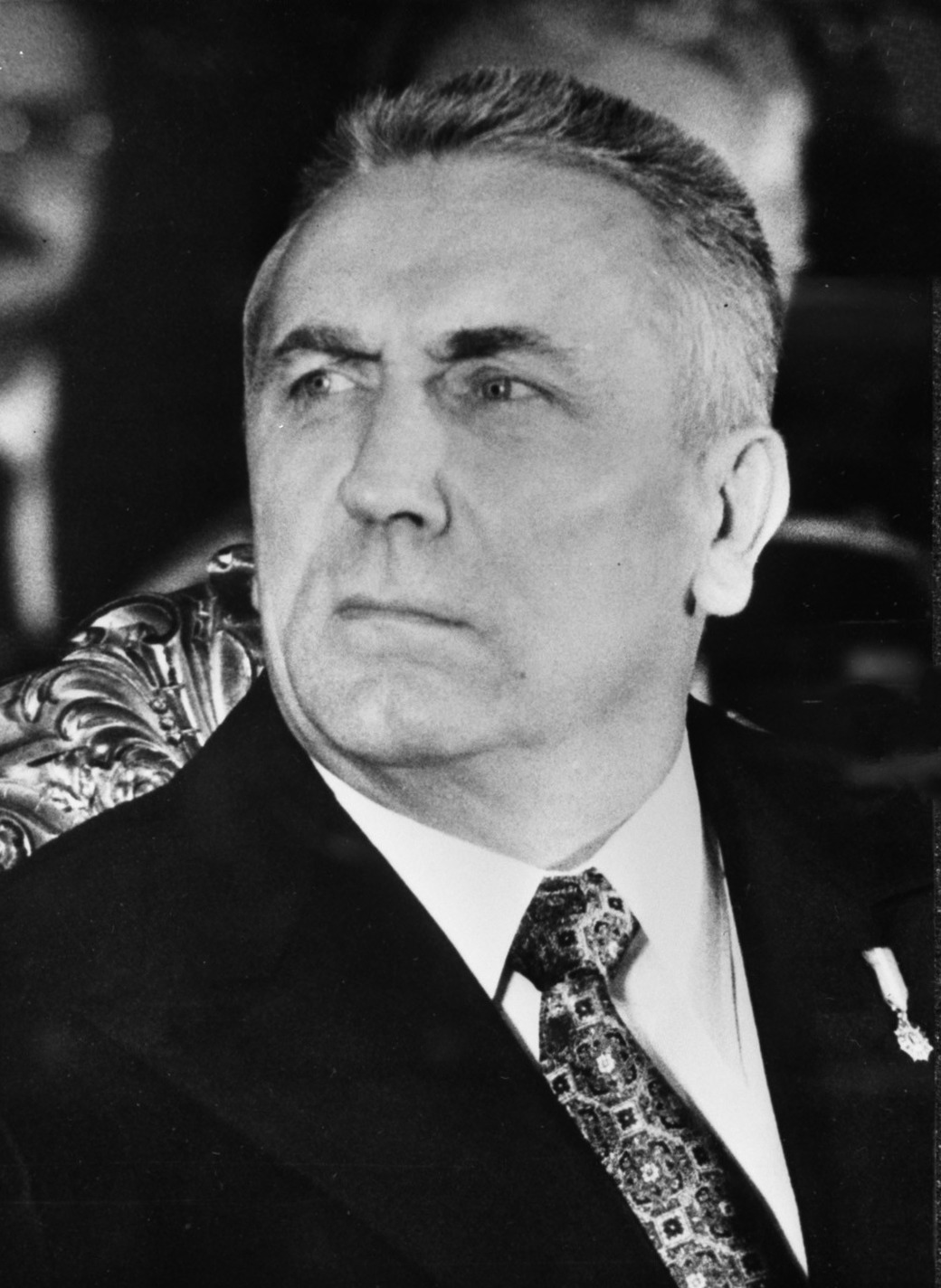
Edward Gierek

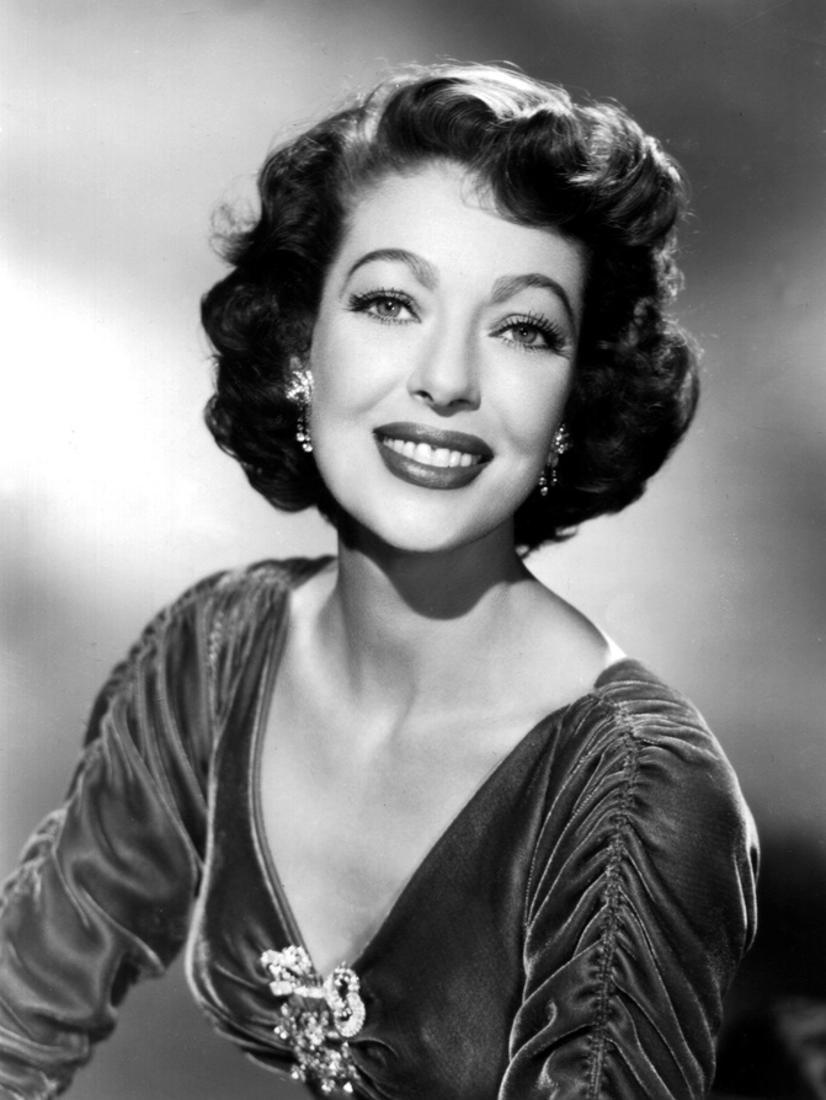
Loretta Young

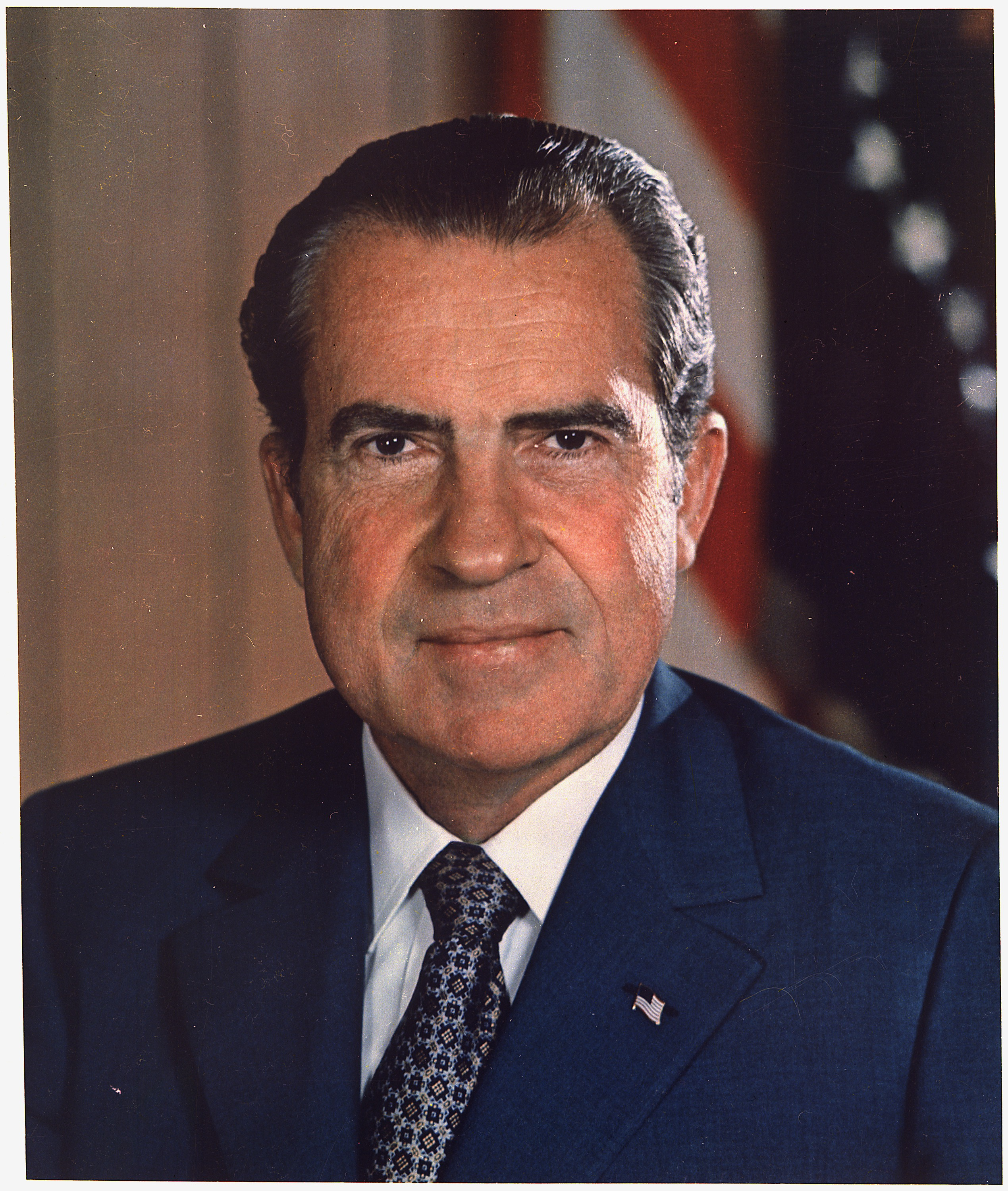
Richard Nixon

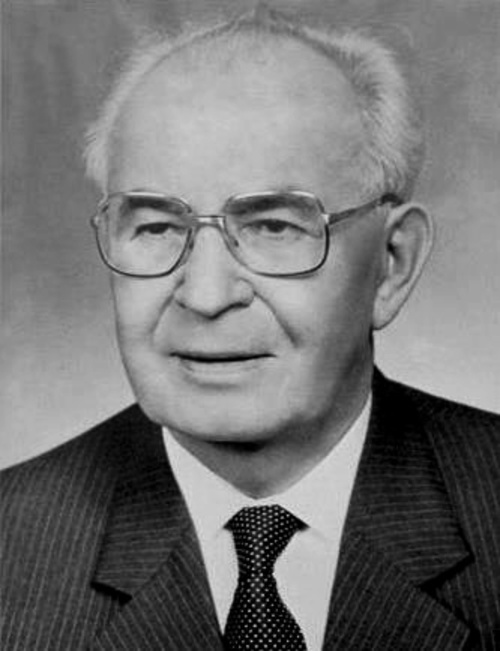
Gustáv Husák

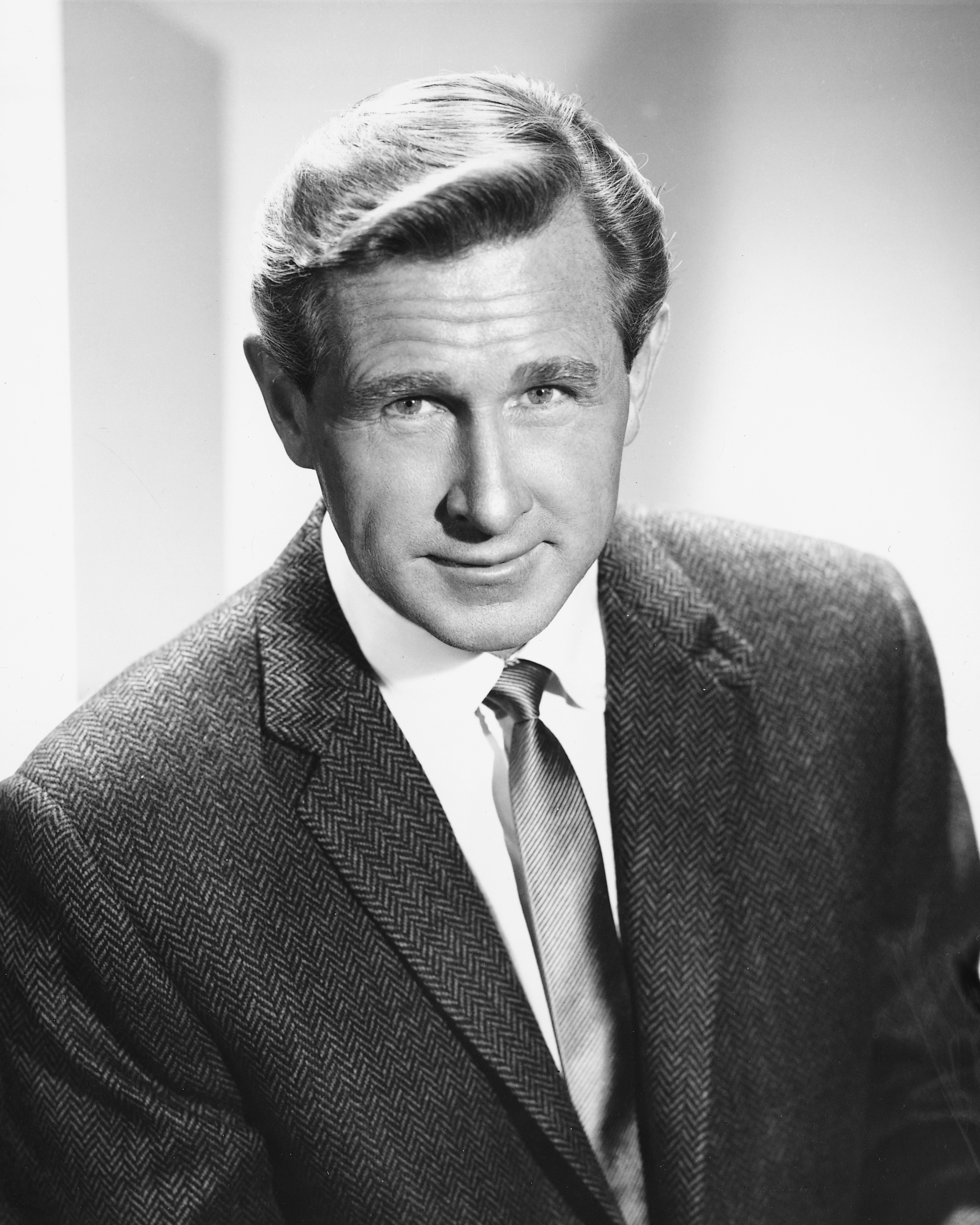
Lloyd Bridges

- January 1 – Shek Kin, Hong Kong actor (d. 2009)
- January 2 – Anna Lee, English-American actress (d. 2004)
- January 4
  - Malietoa Tanumafili II, Samoan head of state (d. 2007)
  - Fred Degazon, president of Dominica (d. 2008)
- January 6
  - Edward Gierek, Polish politician, First Secretary of the Polish United Workers' Party (d. 2001)
  - Loretta Young, American actress (d. 2000)
- January 9 – Richard Nixon, 37th President of the United States (d. 1994)
- January 10
  - Gustáv Husák, Slovak politician, president of Czechoslovakia (d. 1991)
  - Mehmet Shehu, 23rd Prime Minister of Albania (d. 1981)
- January 15 – Lloyd Bridges, American actor (d. 1998)
- January 22 – William Conway, Northern Irish cardinal (d. 1977)
- January 25
  - Huang Hua, foreign minister of China (d. 2010)
  - Witold Lutosławski, Polish composer (d. 1994)
- January 28 – Arlette Vassy, French geophysicist, identified a hole in the ozone layer in 1961 (d. 2000)
- January 29 – Victor Mature, American actor (d. 1999)

=== February ===
- February 2 –
- Poul Reichhardt, Danish actor (d. 1985)
- Oskar Cher, Estonian communist (d. 1942)
- February 4 – Rosa Parks, American civil rights activist (d. 2005)
- February 6 – Mary Leakey, British anthropologist (d. 1996)
- February 10 – Douglas Slocombe, British cinematographer (d. 2016)
- February 14 – Jimmy Hoffa, American labor leader (disappeared 1975)
- February 18 – Artur Axmann, German Nazi national leader of the Hitler Youth (d. 1996)
- February 19 – Frank Tashlin, American animation director (d. 1972)
- February 25
  - Jim Backus, American actor (d. 1989)
  - Gert Fröbe, German actor (d. 1988)
- February 27
  - Paul Ricœur, French philosopher (d. 2005)
  - Kazimierz Sabbat, leader of Polish government-in-exile (d. 1989)
  - Irwin Shaw, American writer (d. 1984)

=== March ===
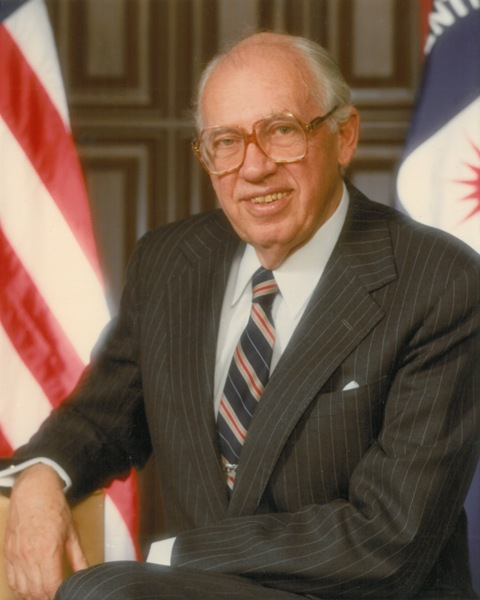
William J. Casey

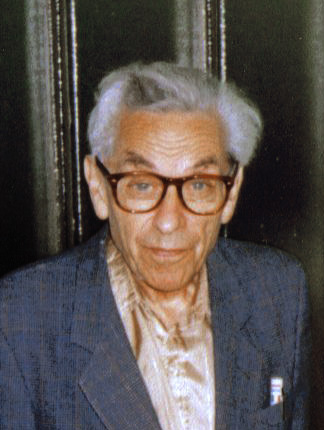
Paul Erdős

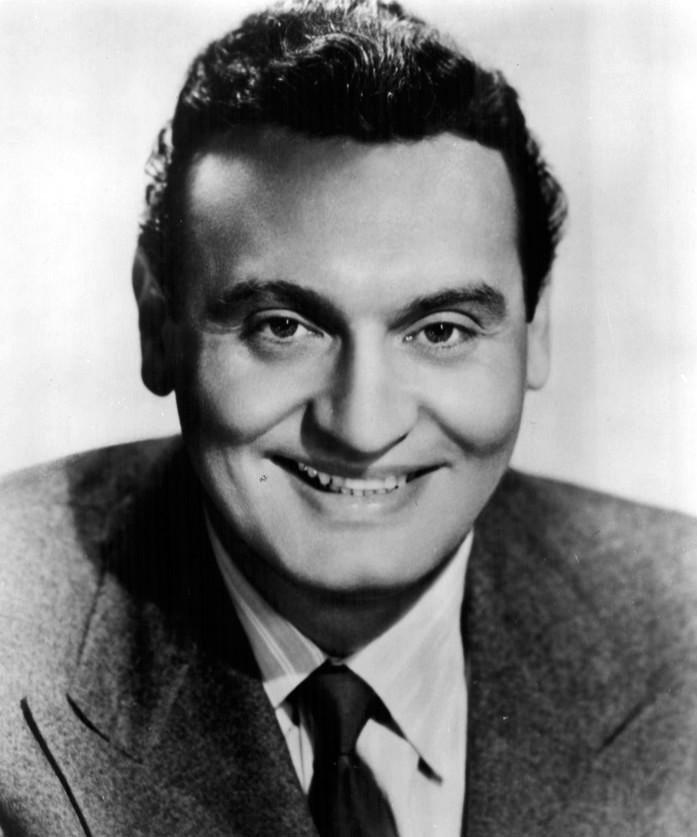
Frankie Laine

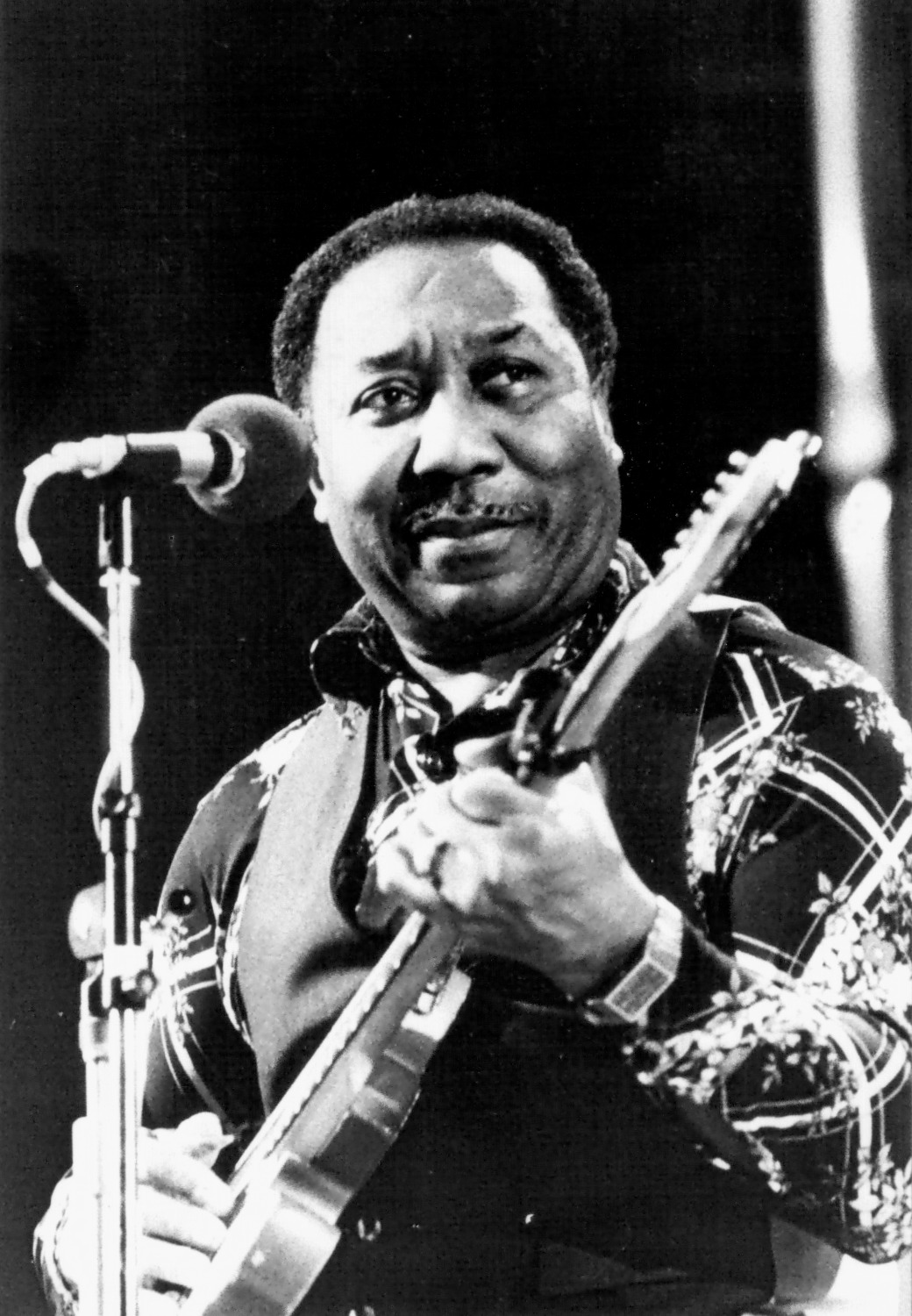
Muddy Waters

- March 4 – John Garfield, American actor (d. 1952)
- March 13
  - William J. Casey, American Central Intelligence Agency director (d. 1987)
  - Sergey Mikhalkov, Russian writer, lyricist (d. 2009)
- March 18
  - René Clément, French film director (d. 1996)
  - Reinhard Hardegen, German U-boat commander (d. 2018)
  - Werner Mölders, German fighter pilot (d. 1941)
- March 26
  - Paul Erdős, Hungarian mathematician (d. 1996)
  - Jacqueline de Romilly, French philologist (d. 2010)
- March 29 – R. S. Thomas, Welsh poet (d. 2000)
- March 30
  - Richard Helms, American Central Intelligence Agency director (d. 2002)
  - Frankie Laine, American singer (d. 2007)
  - Ċensu Tabone, 4th president of Malta (d. 2012)

=== April ===
- April 3 – Per Borten, prime minister of Norway (d. 2005)
- April 4 – Muddy Waters, African-American musician (d. 1983)
- April 8 – Sourou-Migan Apithy, Beninese political figure, 2nd President of Dahomey (d. 1989)
- April 9 – Aleksanteri Saarvala, Finnish artistic gymnast (d. 1989)
- April 10 – Stefan Heym, German writer (d. 2001)
- April 11 – Oleg Cassini, American fashion designer (d. 2006)
- April 11 – Winifred Drinkwater, Scottish aviator, first woman to hold a commercial pilot's license (d. 1996)
- April 16 – Les Tremayne, British-born American actor (d. 2003)
- April 18 – Jack Pope, American judge, attorney, and author (d. 2017)
- April 21 – Richard Beeching, chairman of British Rail (d. 1985)
- April 27 – Philip Hauge Abelson, American physicist, writer, and editor (d. 2004)

=== May ===
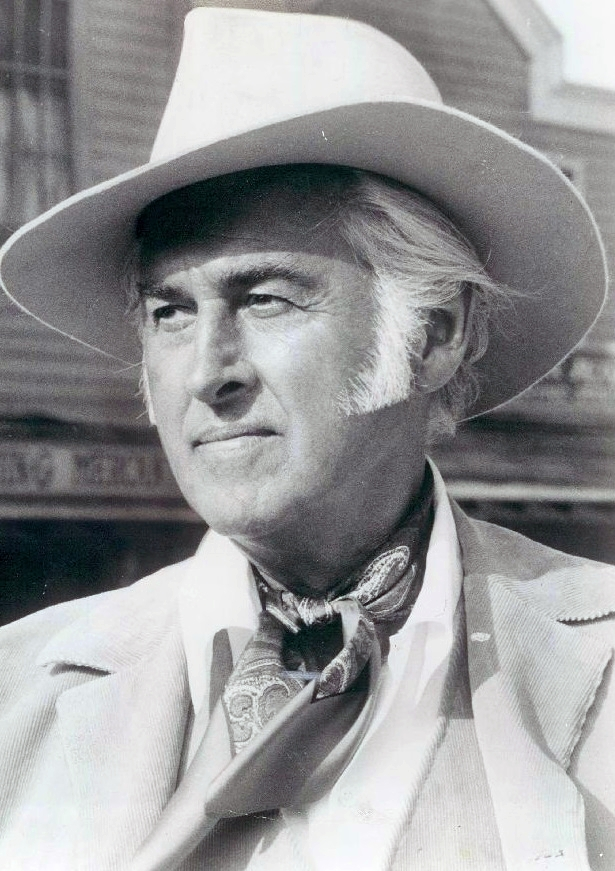
Stewart Granger

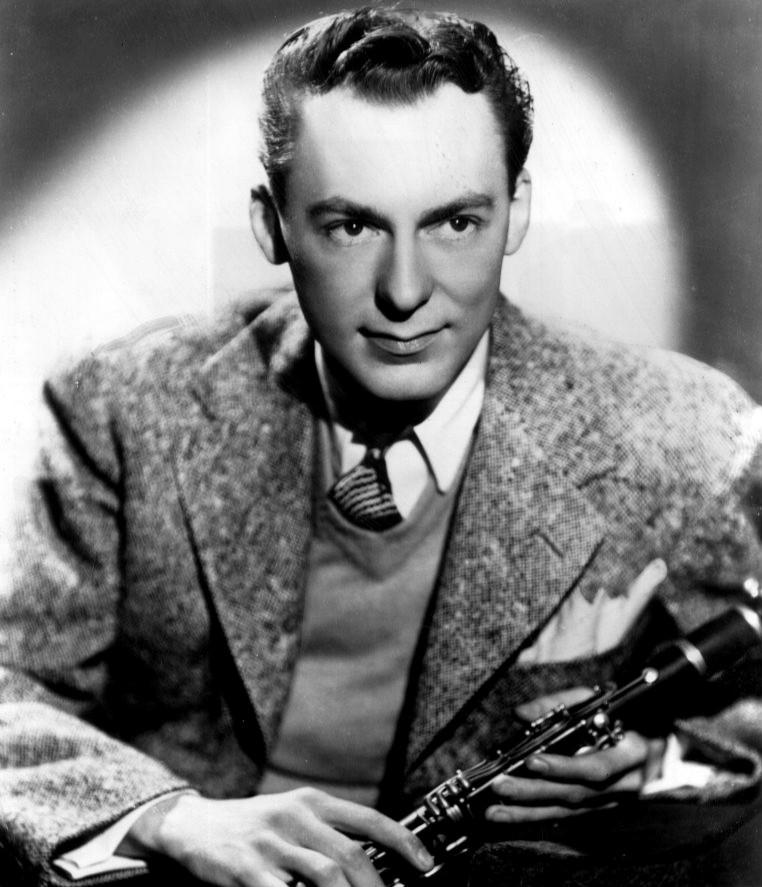
Woody Herman

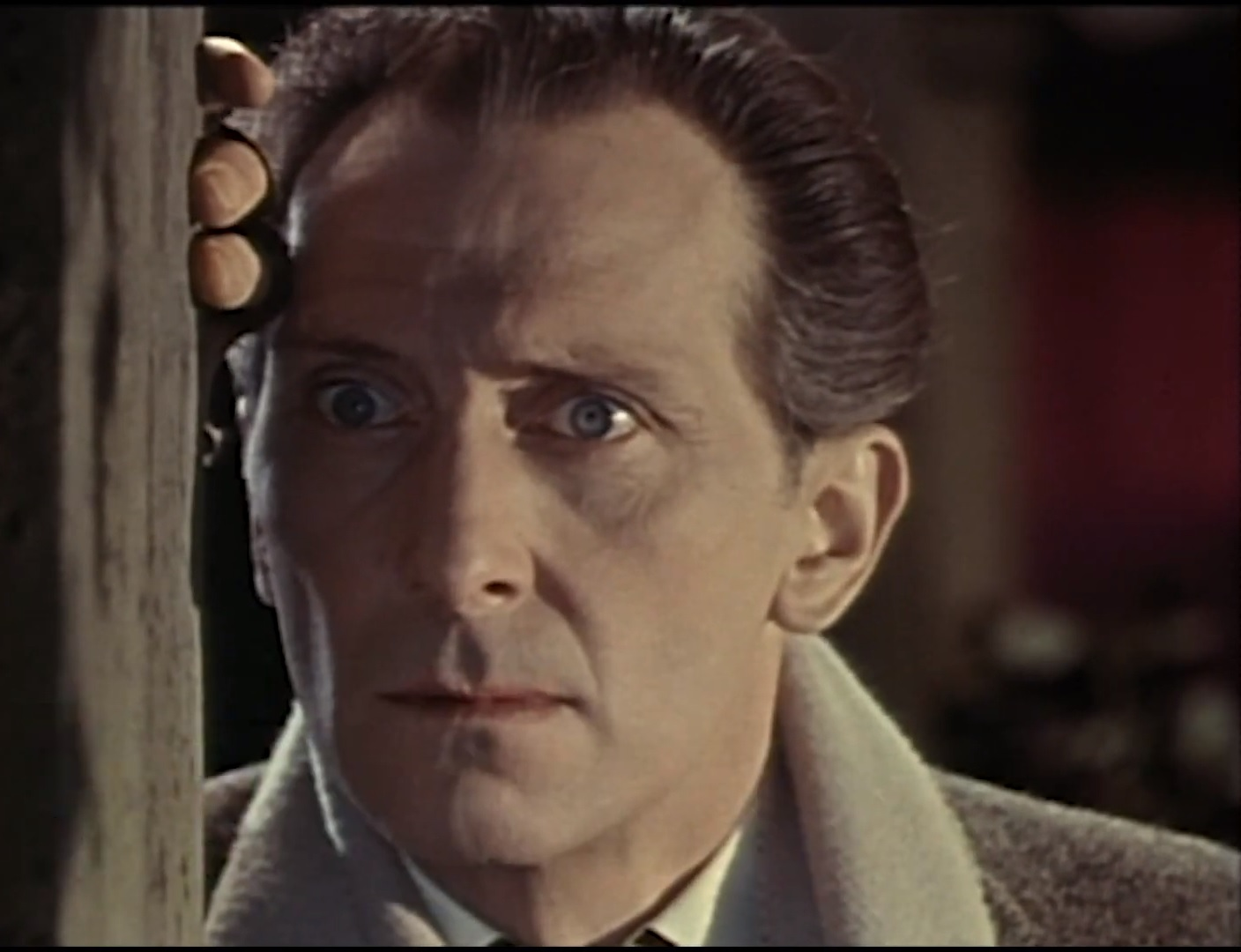
Peter Cushing

- May 1 – Walter Susskind, Czech conductor (d. 1980)
- May 6 – Stewart Granger, British born-American actor (d. 1993)
- May 8
  - Bob Clampett, American director (Looney Tunes) (d. 1984)
  - Sid James, South African-born British actor, comedian (d. 1976)
- May 13 – William Tolbert, President of Liberia (d. 1980)
- May 16 – Woody Herman, American musician, band leader (d. 1987)
- May 19 – Neelam Sanjiva Reddy, Indian politician, 6th President of India (d. 1996)
- May 20 – Teodoro Fernández, Peruvian footballer (d. 1996)
- May 26
  - Peter Cushing, English actor (d. 1994)
  - Josef Manger, German weightlifter (d. 1991)
- May 29
  - Jopie Roosenburg-Goudriaan, Dutch painter (d. 1996)
  - Tony Zale, American boxer (d. 1997)

=== June ===
- June 2 – Elsie Tu, English-born Hong Kong social activist (d. 2015)
- June 11
  - Vince Lombardi, American football coach (d. 1970)
  - Risë Stevens, American mezzo-soprano (d. 2013)
- June 13 – Oswald Teichmüller, German mathematician (d. 1943)
- June 18 – Sammy Cahn, American songwriter (d. 1993)
- June 21
  - Luis Taruc, Filipino political figure, insurgent (d. 2005)
  - Madihe Pannaseeha Thero, Sri Lankan Buddhist monk (d. 2003)
  - Kid Azteca, Mexican boxer (d. 2002)
- June 22 – Álvaro Alsogaray, Argentine politician and businessman (d. 2005)
- June 23
  - Jacques Rabemananjara, Malagasy politician, playwright and poet (d. 2005)
  - William P. Rogers, American diplomat (d. 2001)
- June 26
  - Aimé Césaire, French Martinican poet, politician (d. 2008)
  - Anissa Rawda Najjar, Lebanese feminist, women's rights activist (d. 2016)
  - Maurice Wilkes, British computer scientist (d. 2010)
- June 27 – Elton Britt, American country singer-songwriter (d. 1972)
- June 30 – Alfonso López Michelsen, 24th President of Colombia (d. 2007)

=== July ===
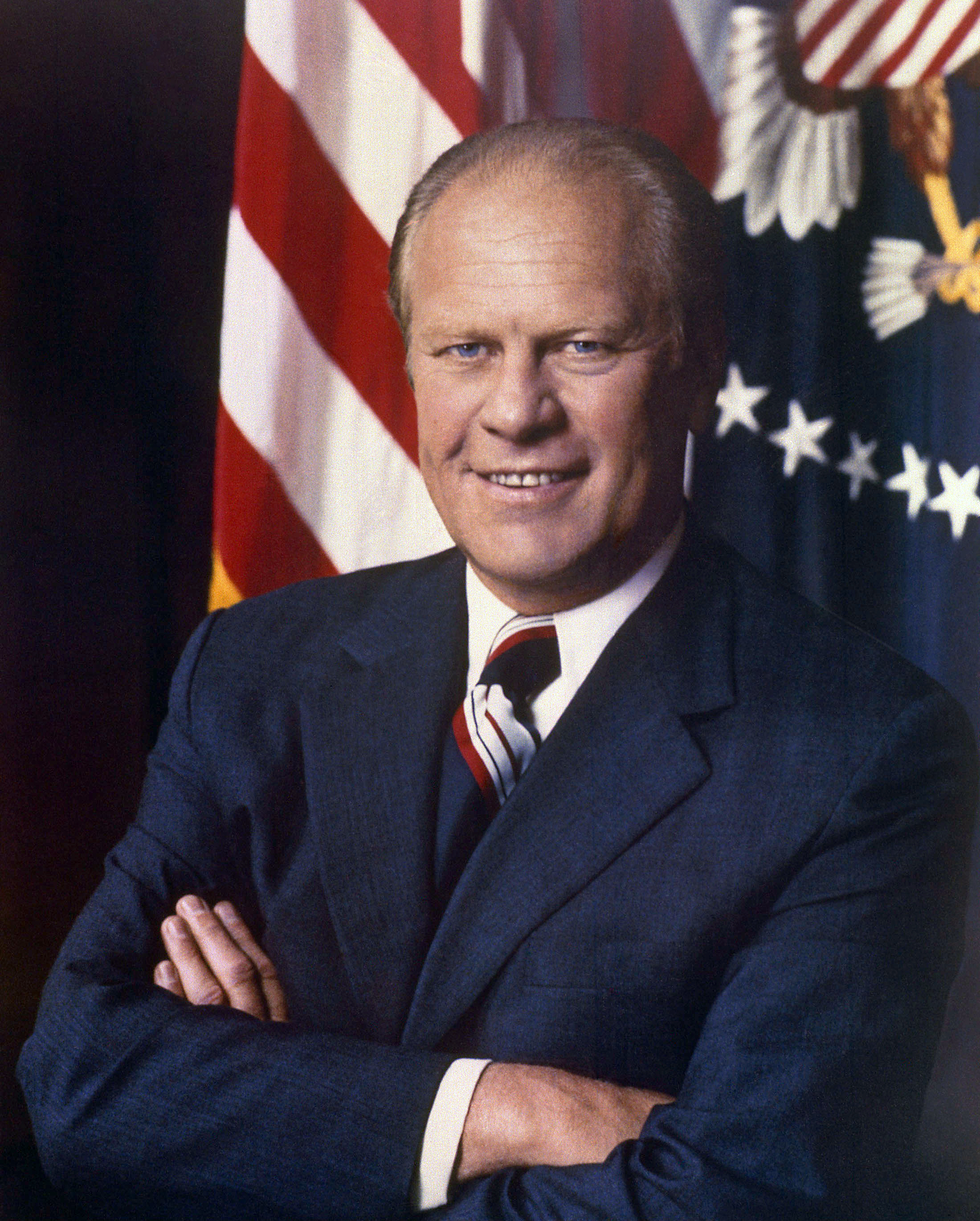
Gerald Ford

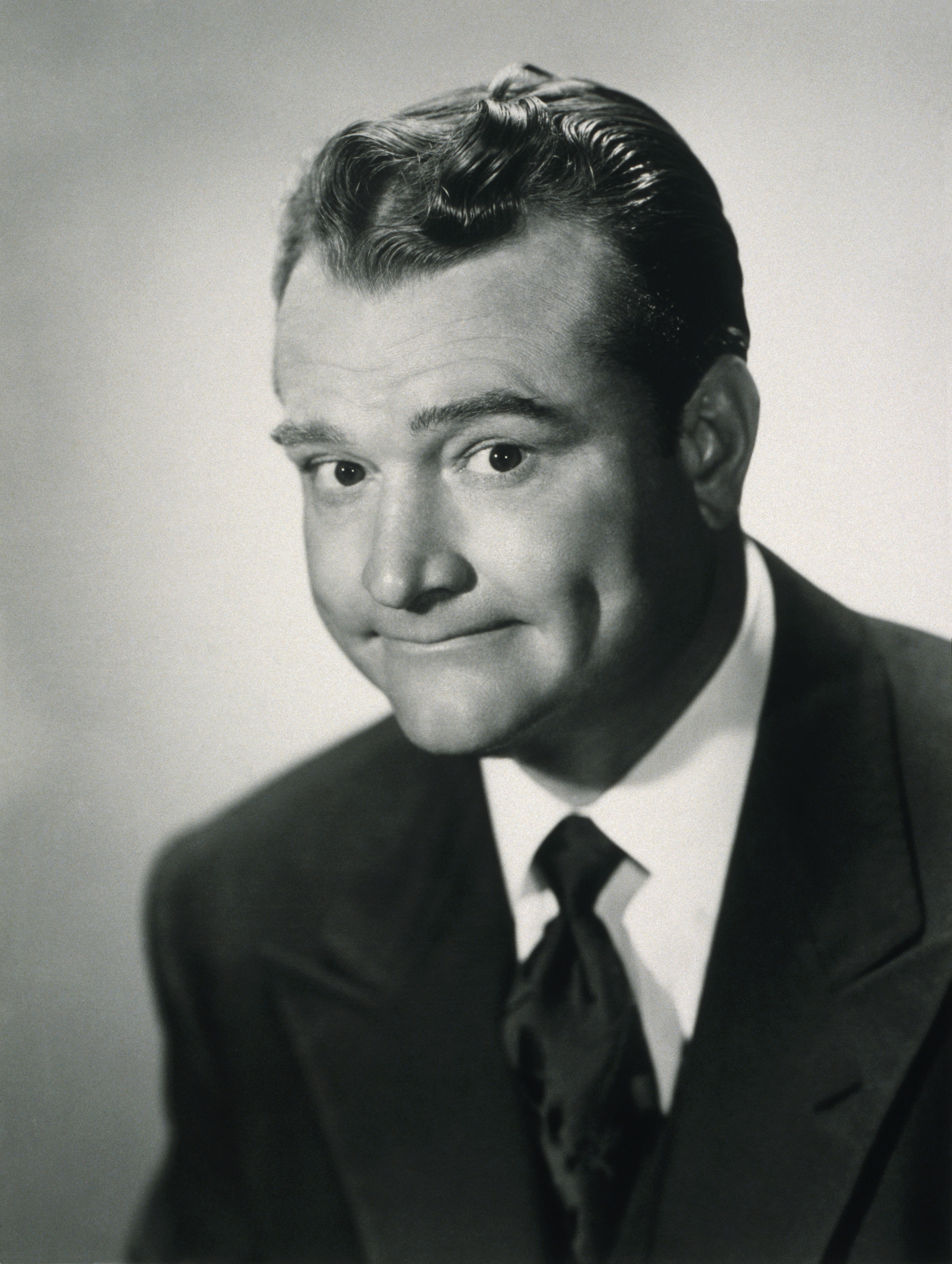
Red Skelton

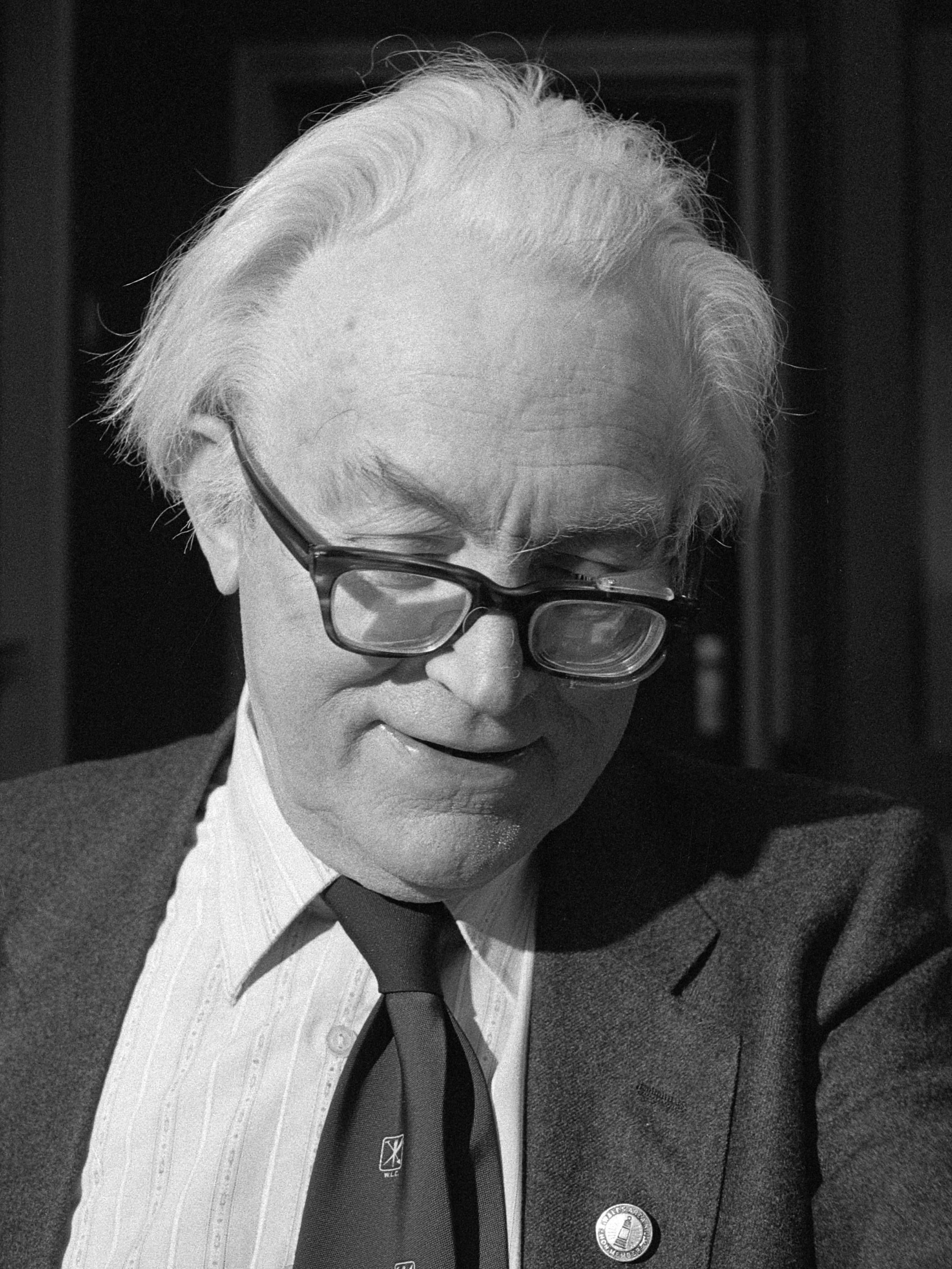
Michael Foot

- July 1 – Paramasiva Prabhakar Kumaramangalam, Indian army chief (d. 2000)
- July 3 – Dorothy Kilgallen, American newspaper columnist (d. 1965)
- July 7 – Pinetop Perkins, American blues musician (d. 2011)
- July 9 – Ted Grant, South African Trotskyist (d. 2006)
- July 11 – Kofi Abrefa Busia, Ghanaian nationalist leader, 2nd Prime Minister of Ghana (d. 1978)
- July 12
  - Syarif Hamid II of Pontianak, Indonesian ruler (d. 1978)
  - Willis Lamb, American physicist, Nobel Prize laureate (d. 2008)
- July 13 – Mærsk Mc-Kinney Møller, Danish shipping magnate (d. 2012)
- July 14 – Gerald Ford, 38th President of the United States (d. 2006)
- July 15
  - Hammond Innes, English author (d. 1998)
  - Abraham Sutzkever, Yiddish language poet, memoirist (d. 2010)
- July 16 – Carmen Acevedo Vega, Ecuadorian poet, writer, and journalist (d. 2006)
- July 18
  - Du Runsheng, Chinese military officer, politician, and economist (d. 2015)
  - Red Skelton, American comedian (d. 1997)
- July 22 – Licia Albanese, Italian-born American soprano (d. 2014)
- July 23
  - Coral Browne, Australian actress (d. 1991)
  - Michael Foot, British politician (d. 2010)
- July 26 – Kan Yuet-keung, Hong Kong banker, politician and lawyer (d. 2012)
- July 29 – Erich Priebke, German war criminal, leader of the 1944 Ardeatine massacre (d. 2013)

=== August ===
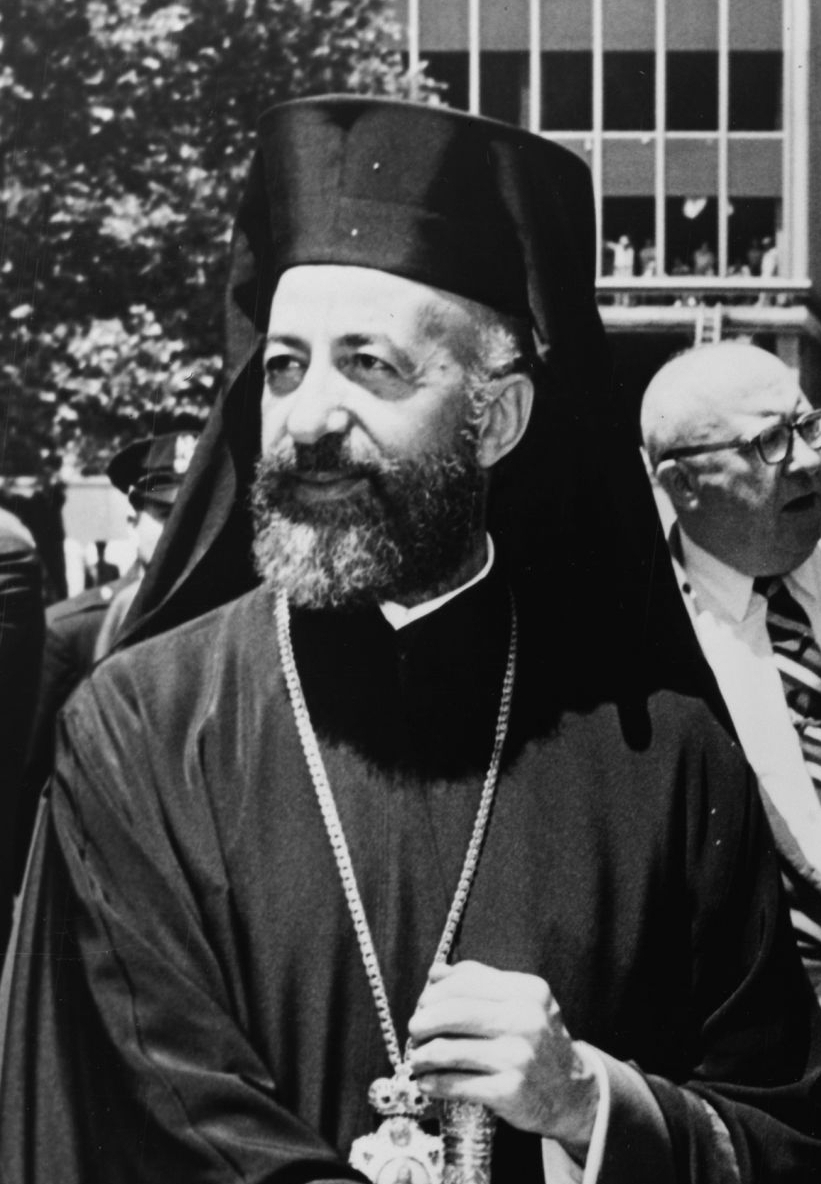
Makarios III

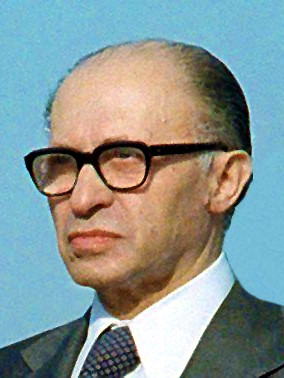
Menachem Begin

- August 10 – Wolfgang Paul, German physicist (d. 1993)
- August 13 – Makarios III, Archbishop and first President of Cyprus (d. 1977)
- August 14 – Fred Davis, English snooker and billiards player (d. 1998)
- August 16 – Menachem Begin, Polish-born 6th Prime Minister of Israel, recipient of the Nobel Peace Prize (d. 1992)
- August 20 – Roger Wolcott Sperry, American neurobiologist, recipient of the Nobel Prize in Physiology or Medicine (d. 1994)
- August 26 – Boris Pahor, Slovenian writer (d. 2022)
- August 28
  - Robertson Davies, Canadian novelist (d. 1995)
  - Richard Tucker, American tenor (d. 1975)
- August 30 – Richard Stone, British economist, Nobel Prize laureate (d. 1991)
- August 31
  - Helen Levitt, American photographer (d. 2009)
  - Bernard Lovell, British radio astronomer (d. 2012)

=== September ===
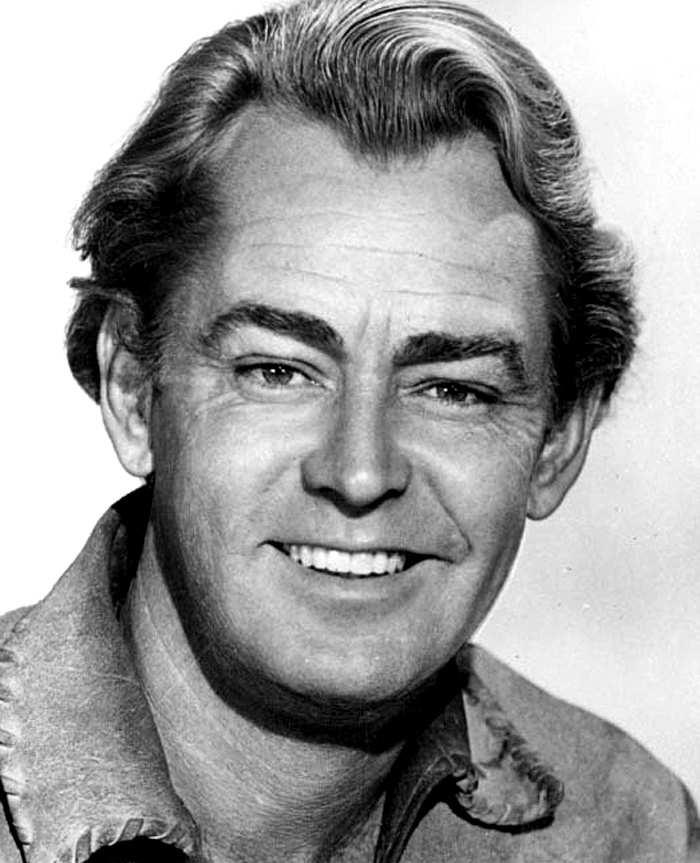
Alan Ladd

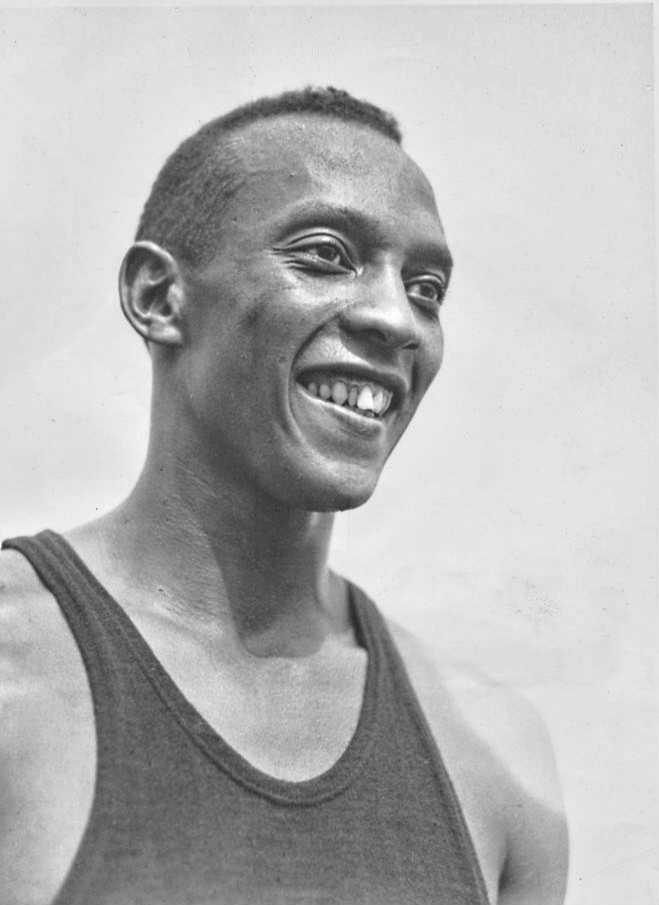
Jesse Owens

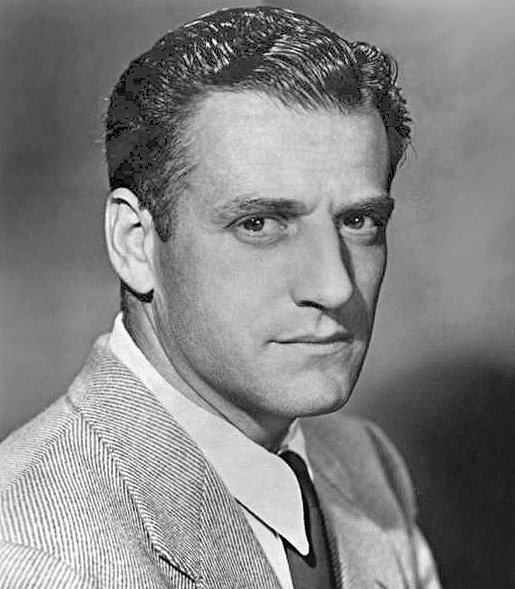
Stanley Kramer

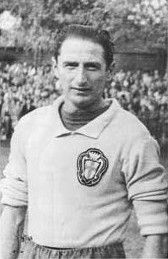
Silvio Piola

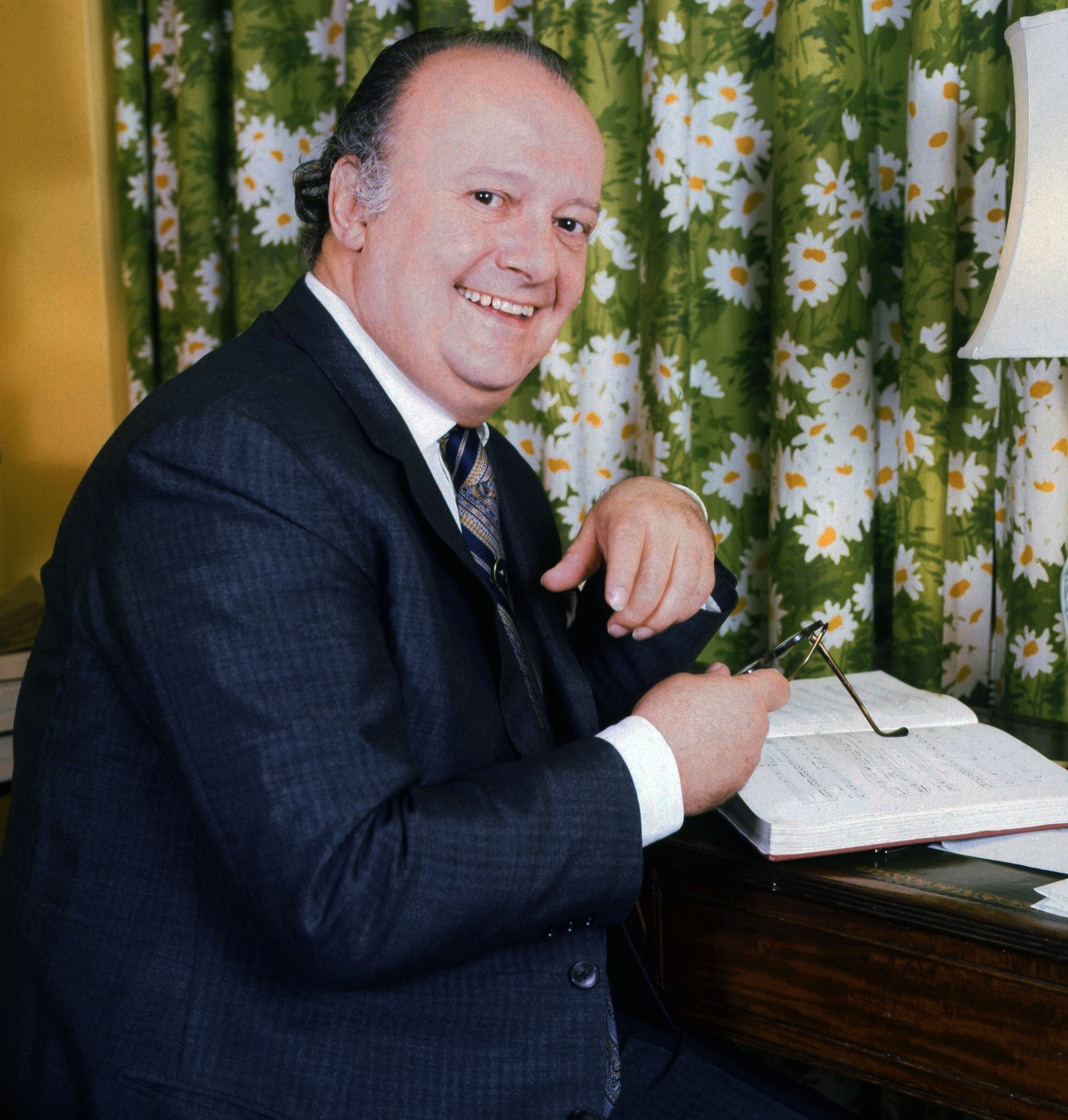
Tito Gobbi

- September 1 – Ludwig Merwart, Austrian painter, graphic artist (d. 1979)
- September 2
  - Israel Gelfand, Russian mathematician (d. 2009)
  - Bill Shankly, Scottish football manager (d. 1981)
- September 3 – Alan Ladd, American actor (d. 1964)
- September 4
  - Stanford Moore, American chemist, Nobel Prize laureate (d. 1982)
  - Kenzō Tange, Japanese architect (d. 2005)
- September 11 – Bear Bryant, American football coach (d. 1983)
- September 12
  - Jesse Owens, American athlete (d. 1980)
  - Eiji Toyoda, Japanese industrialist (d. 2013)
- September 14 – Jacobo Árbenz, president of Guatemala (d. 1971)
- September 15 – John N. Mitchell, United States Attorney General, convicted Watergate criminal (d. 1988)
- September 17 – Ata Kandó, Hungarian-born Dutch photographer (d. 2017)
- September 19 – Frances Farmer, American actress (d. 1970)
- September 24 – Herb Jeffries, American actor, popular music and jazz singer (d. 2014)
- September 25 – Charles Helou, 9th President of Lebanon (d. 2001)
- September 27 – Alexandru Drăghici, Romanian communist activist and politician (d. 1993)
- September 28 – Warja Lavater, Swiss artist, illustrator (d. 2007)
- September 29
  - Trevor Howard, English actor (d. 1988)
  - Stanley Kramer, American film producer, director, and writer (d. 2001)
  - Silvio Piola, Italian footballer (d. 1996)

=== October ===
- October 2 – Roma Mitchell, Australian lawyer, Governor of South Australia (d. 2000)
- October 4 – Martial Célestin, 1st Prime Minister of Haiti (d. 2011)
- October 5 – Ken Weeks, Oldest living person in Australia, and the oldest verified man in Australian history
- October 6 – Mario Dal Fabbro, Italian American sculptor, furniture designer, and author (d. 1990)
- October 10 – Claude Simon, French writer, Nobel Prize laureate (d. 2005)
- October 11 – Joe Simon, American comic book artist, writer (d. 2011)
- October 19 – Vinicius de Moraes, Brazilian poet, lyricist, and diplomat (d. 1980)
- October 22
  - Robert Capa, Hungarian-born American photojournalist (d. 1954)
  - Hans-Peter Tschudi, 2-time President of Switzerland (d. 2002)
- October 24 – Tito Gobbi, Italian operatic baritone (d. 1984)
- October 27
  - Joe Medicine Crow, American tribal historian and anthropologist (d. 2016)
  - Marie-Hélène Schwartz, French mathematician (d. 2013)
  - Otto Wichterle, Czech inventor of the modern contact lens (d. 1998)

=== November ===
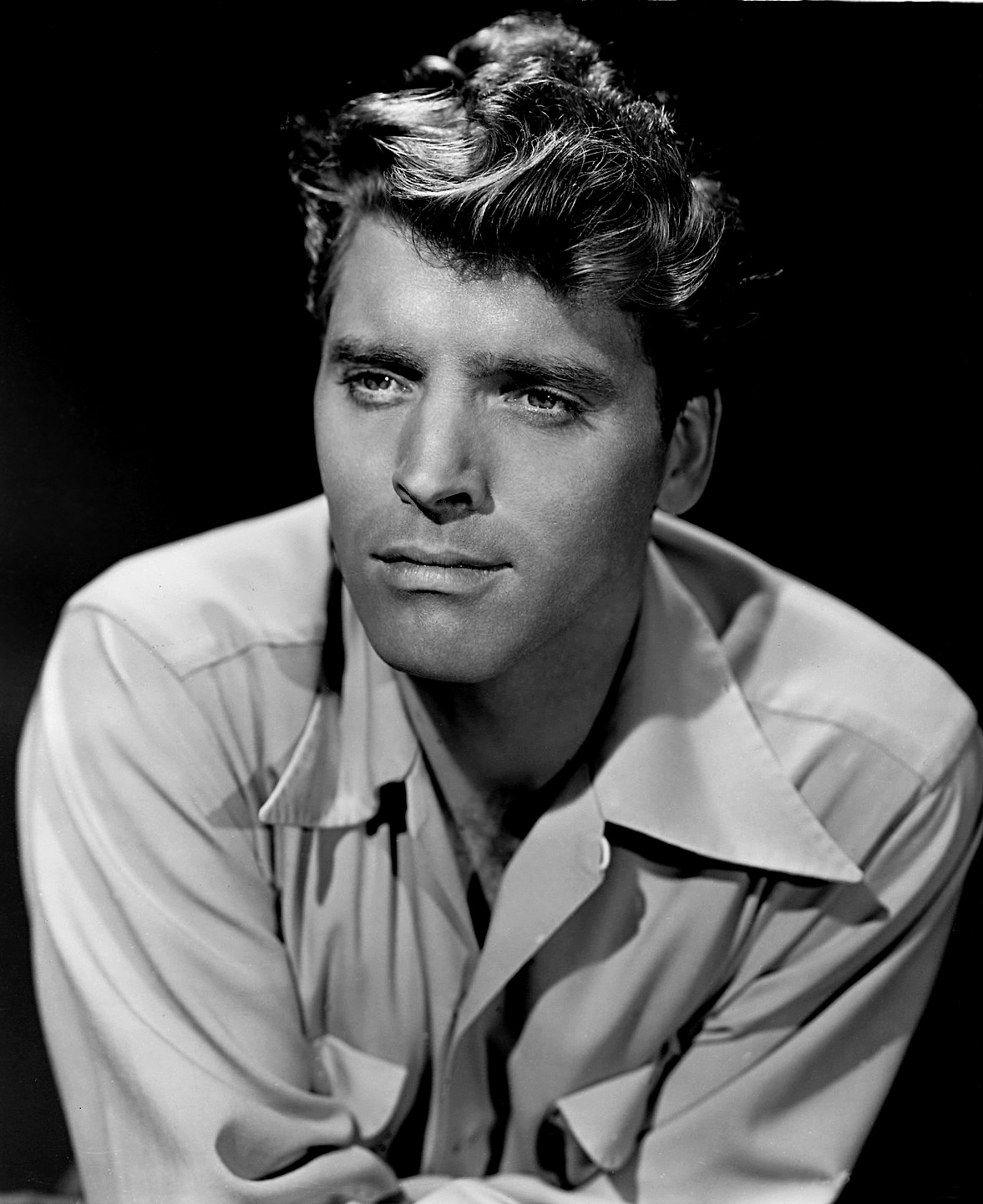
Burt Lancaster

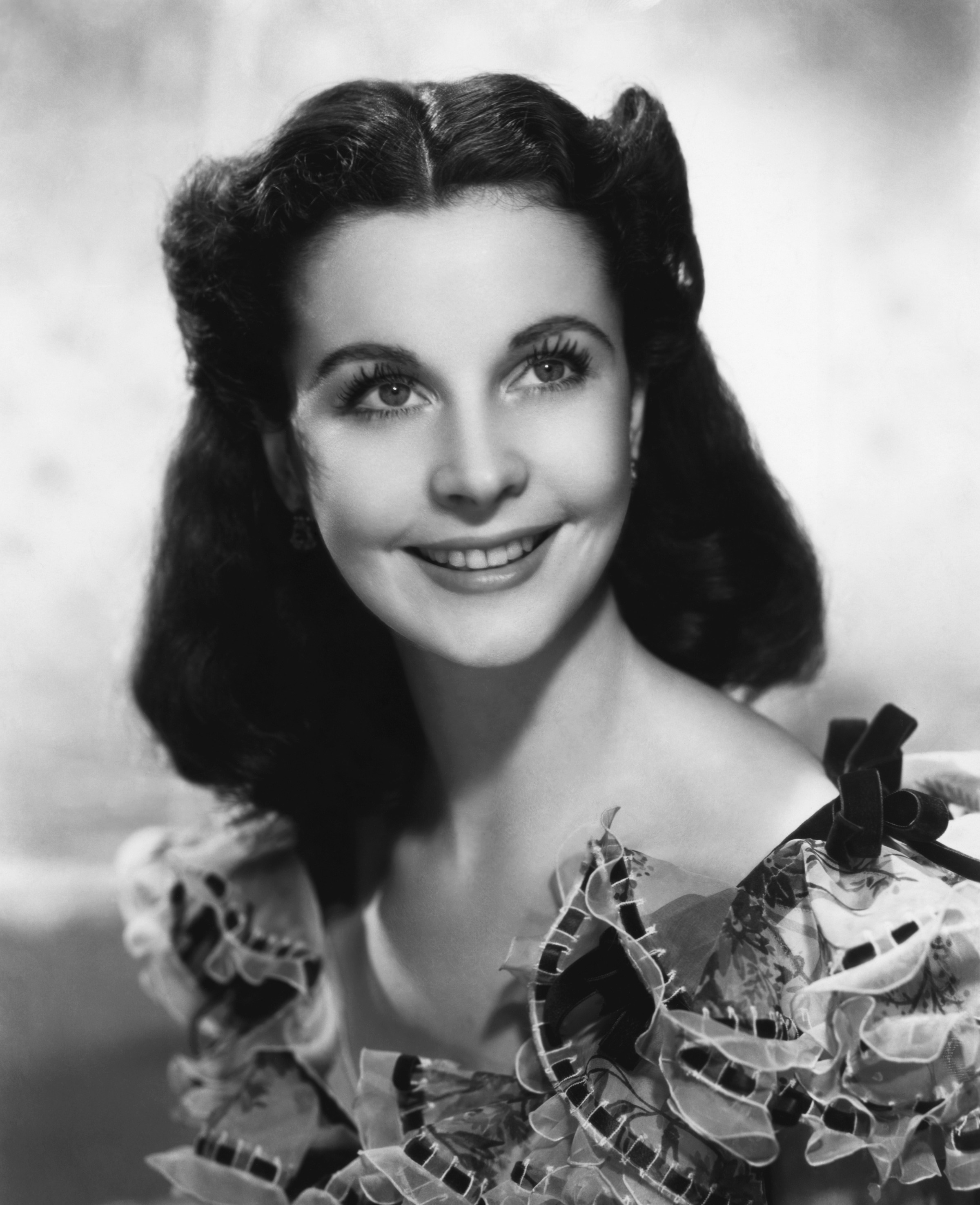
Vivien Leigh

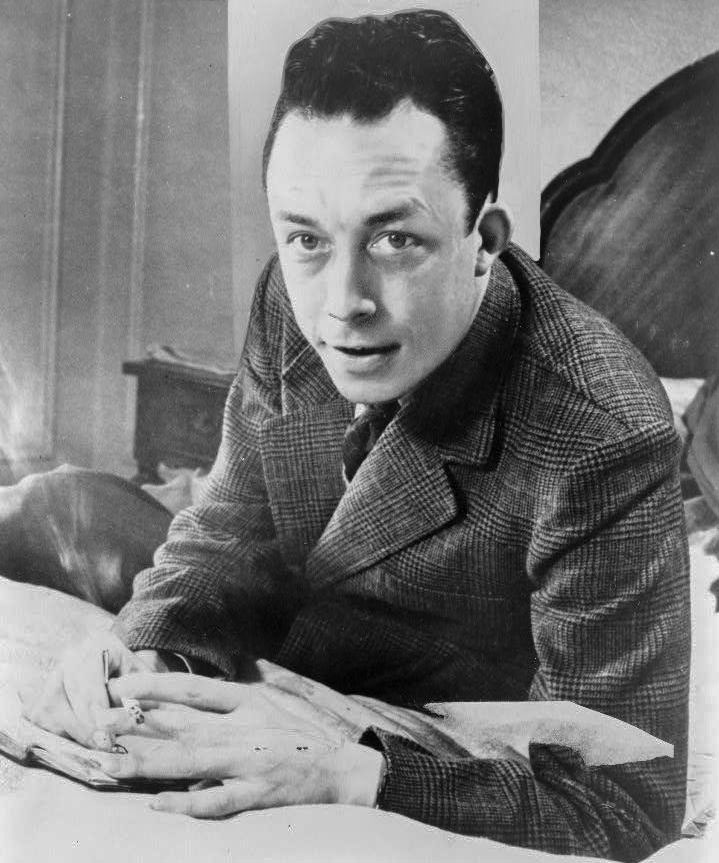
Albert Camus

- November 2 – Burt Lancaster, American actor (d. 1994)
- November 3 – Marika Rökk, Egyptian-born Austrian singer, dancer and actress (d. 2004)
- November 5 – Vivien Leigh, British actress (d. 1967)
- November 6 – Cho Ki-chon, North Korean poet (d. 1951)
- November 7
  - Albert Camus, French writer, Nobel Prize laureate (d. 1960)
  - Elizabeth Bradford Holbrook, Canadian sculptor (d. 2009)
- November 10
  - Álvaro Cunhal, Portuguese politician (d. 2005)
  - Sun Yun-suan, Chinese engineer, politician (d. 2006)
- November 13 – Lon Nol, 2-Time Prime Minister of Cambodia (d. 1985)
- November 18 – Endre Rozsda, Hungarian-French painter (d. 1999)
- November 21 – Boulting brothers, English filmmakers (d. 1985, 2001)
- November 22
  - Benjamin Britten, English composer (d. 1976)
  - Gardnar Mulloy, American tennis player and coach (d. 2016)
  - Cecilia Muñoz-Palma, first female Philippine Supreme Court Justice (d. 2006)
- November 24 – Carlos Bulosan, Filipino-American novelist and poet (d. 1956)

=== December ===
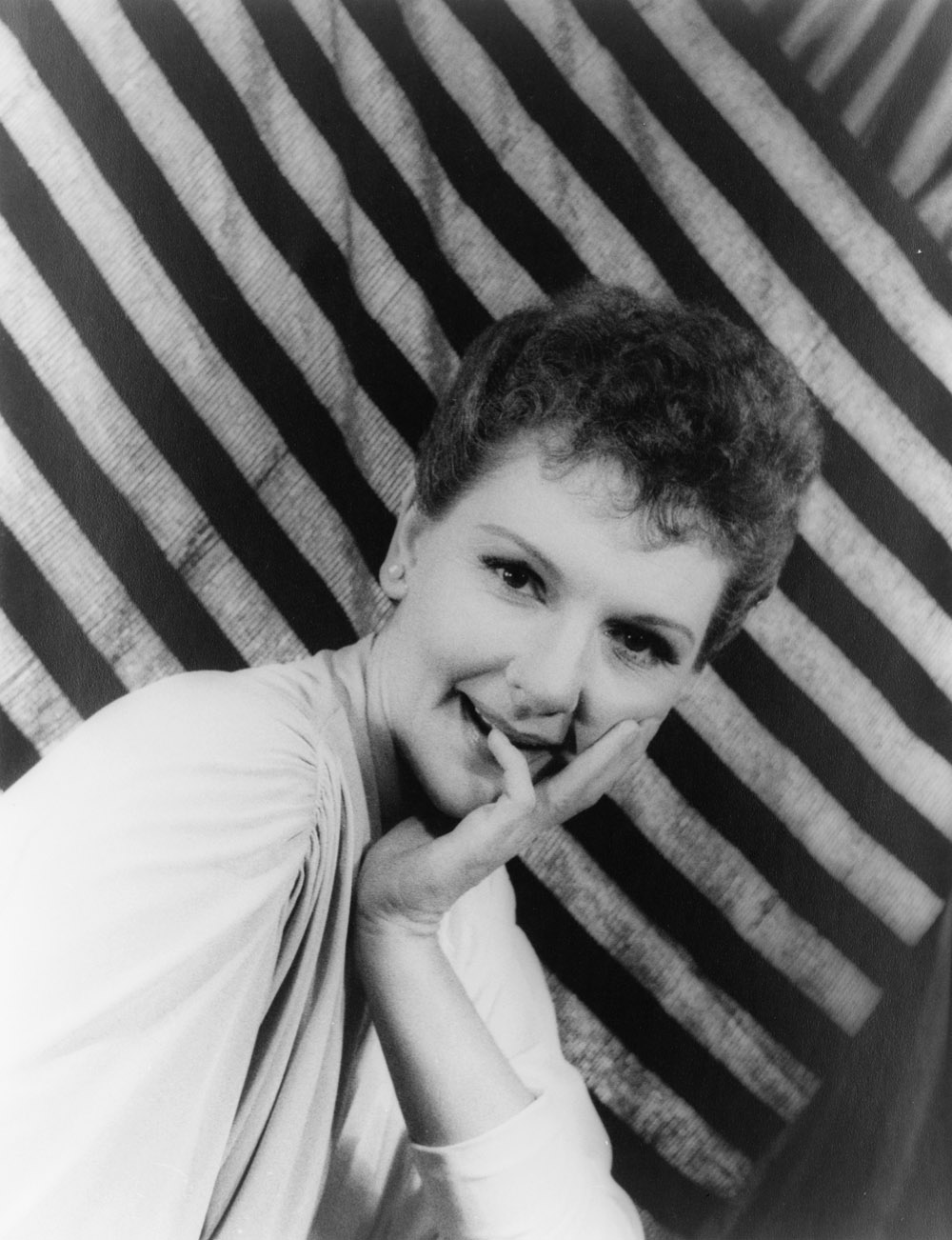
Mary Martin

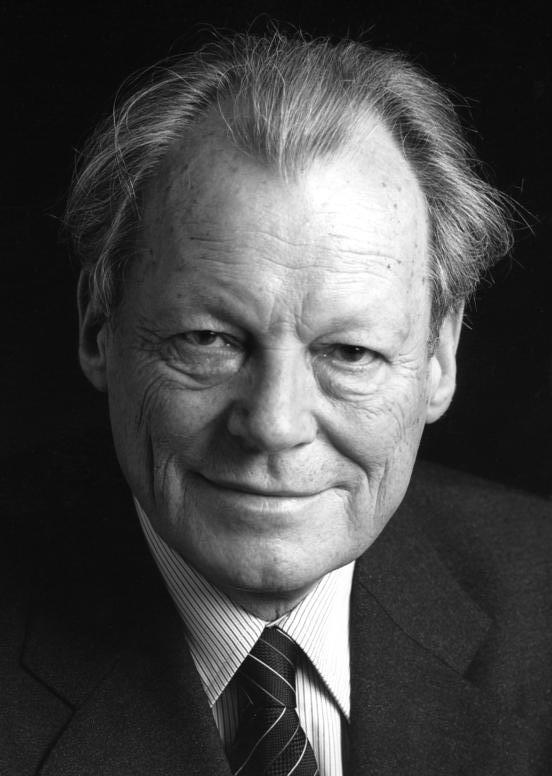
Willy Brandt

- December 1 – Mary Martin, American actress (d. 1990)
- December 6
  - Nikolai Amosov, Ukrainian heart surgeon, inventor, best-selling author, and exercise enthusiast (d. 2002)
  - Eleanor Holm, American swimmer (d. 2004)
- December 10 – Morton Gould, American composer (d. 1996)
- December 11 – Jean Marais, French actor (d. 1998)
- December 16 – George Ignatieff, Canadian diplomat, recipient of the 1984 Pearson Medal of Peace (d. 1989)
- December 18
  - Lynn Bari, American actress (d. 1989)
  - Alfred Bester, American author (d. 1987)
  - Willy Brandt, Chancellor of Germany, recipient of the Nobel Peace Prize (d. 1992)
- December 25 – Tony Martin, American singer and actor (d. 2012)
- December 26 – Frank Swift, English footballer (d. 1958)
- December 29 – Pierre Werner, Prime Minister of Luxembourg (d. 2002)
- December 30 – Elyne Mitchell, Australian author (d. 2002)

=== Date unknown ===
- Pere Areny, last person executed by Andorra (d. 1943)
- Bahjat Talhouni, 4-time Prime Minister of Jordan (d. 1994)

== Deaths ==
=== January ===
- January 2
  - Hermann Kinkelin, Swiss mathematician and politician (b. 1832)
  - Léon Teisserenc de Bort, French meteorologist (b. 1855)
- January 3 – Jeff Davis, American politician, 20th Governor of Arkansas (b. 1862)
- January 4 – Alfred von Schlieffen, German field marshal (b. 1833)
- January 6 – Gyula Juhász, Hungarian sculptor (b. 1876)
- January 8 – Xavier Mertz, Swiss explorer, mountaineer and skier (b. 1882)
- January 16
  - Tom Dolan, American baseball pitcher (b. 1855)
  - Thaddeus S. C. Lowe, American aeronaut, scientist and inventor (b. 1832)
- January 18 – George Alexander Gibson, Scottish physician (b. 1854)
- January 20
  - José Guadalupe Posada, Mexican political printmaker and engraver (b. 1852)
  - Karl Wittgenstein, Austrian steel tycoon (b. 1847)
- January 21 – Aluísio Azevedo, Brazilian novelist (b. 1857)
- January 27 – Archduke Rainer Ferdinand of Austria (b. 1832)
- January 28
  - Julius Heinrich Franz, German astronomer (b. 1847)
  - Segismundo Moret, Spanish politician and writer, 3-time Prime Minister of Spain (b. 1833)

=== February ===
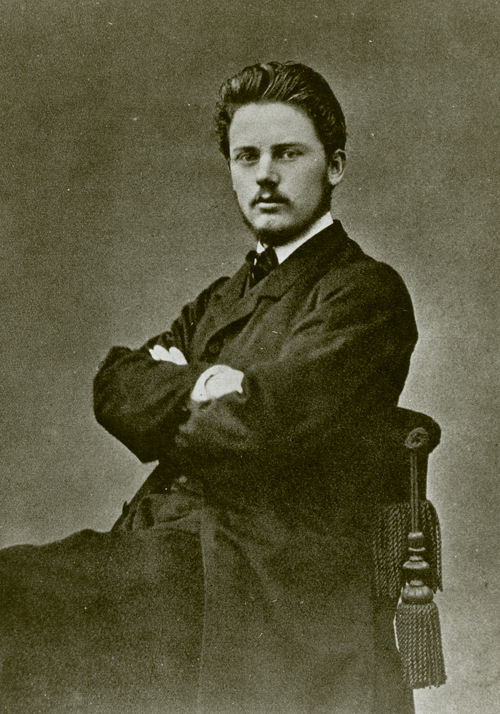
Gustaf de Laval

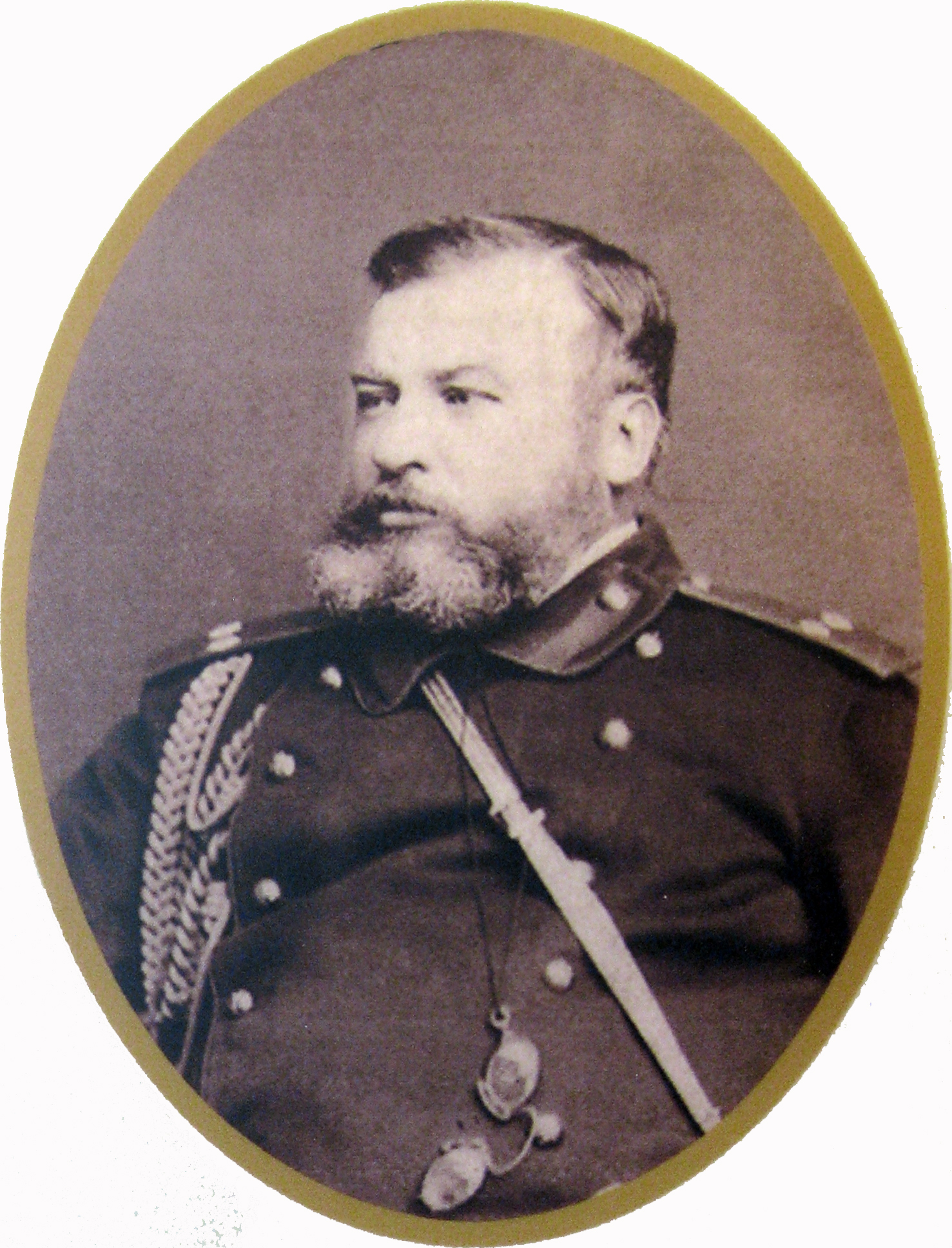
Yohan Kazimir Ernrot

- February 2 – Gustaf de Laval, Swedish engineer and inventor (b. 1845)
- February 5
  - Johan Ehrnrooth, 5th Prime Minister of Bulgaria (b. 1833)
  - Lio Gangeri, Italian sculptor (b. 1845)
- February 8 – Morten Eskesen, Danish author (b. 1826)
- February 9 – Manuel Enrique Araujo, 23rd President of El Salvador (b. 1865)
- February 15 – Florence Barker, American actress (b. 1891)
- February 17 – Edward Stanley Gibbons, English philatelist, founder of Stanley Gibbons Ltd (b. 1840)
- February 20 – Robert von Lieben, Austrian physicist (b. 1878)
- February 22
  - Ferdinand de Saussure, Swiss linguist and semiotician (b. 1857)
  - Empress Dowager Longyu, Chinese empress (b. 1868)
  - Francisco I. Madero, 33rd President of Mexico (b. 1873)
- February 23 – Dénes Andrássy, Hungarian nobleman (b. 1835)
- February 26 – Felix Draeseke, German composer (b. 1835)
- February 28 – George Finnegan, American Olympic boxer (b. 1881)

=== March ===
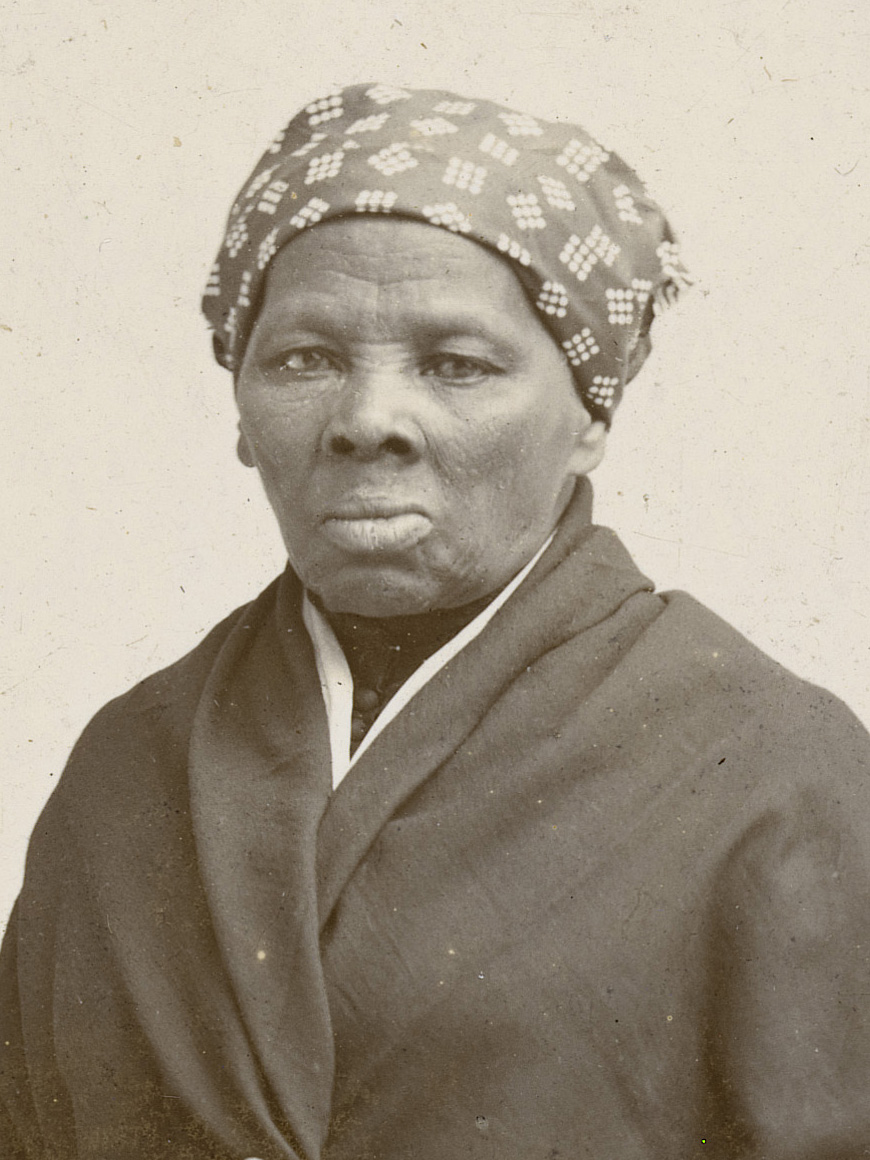
Harriet Tubman

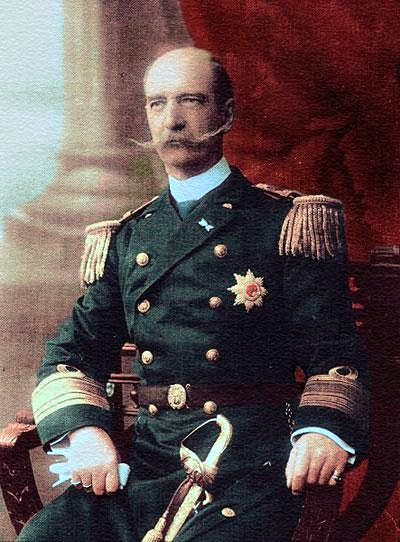
King George I of Greece

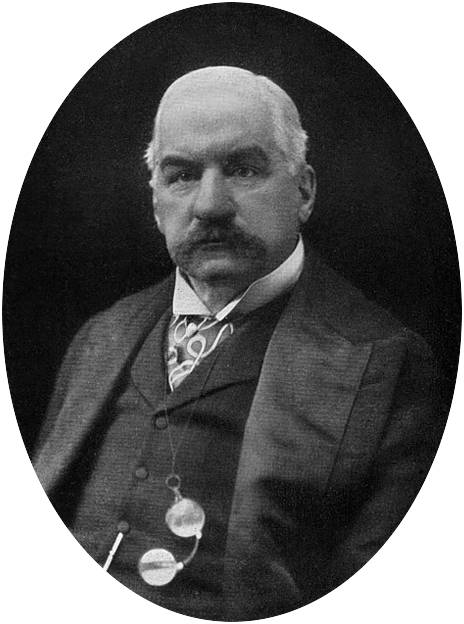
J. P. Morgan

- March 7 – E. Pauline Johnson, Canadian writer (b. 1861)
- March 10 – Harriet Tubman, American abolitionist, humanitarian and spy (b. c. 1822)
- March 11 – John Shaw Billings, American military, medical leader (b. 1838)
- March 12 – Francisco Pereira Passos, Brazilian engineer politician, Mayor of Rio de Janeiro (b. 1836)
- March 13 – Felix Hidalgo, Filipino artist (b. 1855)
- March 14 – Auguste Desgodins, French missionary (b. 1826)
- March 17 – Soledad Acosta, Colombian journalist and writer (b. 1833)
- March 18 – King George I of Greece (b. 1845)
- March 19 – Géza Allaga, Hungarian composer (b. 1841)
- March 21 – Manuel Bonilla, 2-time President of Honduras (b. 1849)
- March 22
  - Gheorghe Grigore Cantacuzino, Romanian lawyer and politician, 20th Prime Minister of Romania (b. 1833)
  - Sung Chiao-jen, Chinese revolutionary (b. 1882)
- March 25 – Garnet Wolseley, 1st Viscount Wolseley, British field marshal (b. 1833)
- March 31 – J. P. Morgan, American financier (b. 1837)

=== April ===
- April 7 – Carl von Lemcke, German mathematician (b. 1867)
- April 8 – Gyula Kőnig, Hungarian mathematician (b. 1849)
- April 15 – Kareemullah Shah, Indian Sufi scholar and saint
- April 18 – Lester Frank Ward, American botanist, paleontologist and sociologist (b. 1841)
- April 19
  - Paul Janson, Belgian politician (b. 1840)
  - Hugo Winckler, German archaeologist and historian who uncovered the capital of the Hittite Empire (Hattusa) (b. 1863)
- April 20 – Vilhelm Bissen, Danish sculptor (b. 1836)
- April 24 – Vsevolod Abramovich, Russian aviator (b. 1890)
- April 25
  - Mykhailo Kotsiubynsky, Ukrainian author (b. 1864)
  - Stjepan Kovačević, Croatian politician (b. 1841)
- April 27 – Gabriel von Seidl, German architect (b. 1848)
- April 28 – Andreas Flocken, German entrepreneur and inventor (b. 1845)
- April 29 – Václav Hladík, Austro-Hungarian novelist (b. 1868)

=== May ===
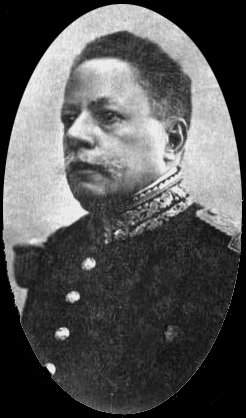
Tancrède Auguste

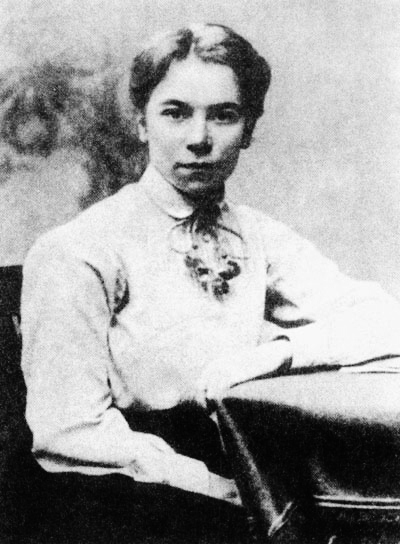
Elena Guro

- May 1 – John Barclay Armstrong, Texas Ranger, U.S. Marshal (b. 1850)
- May 2
  - Tancrède Auguste, Haitian general, 20th President of Haiti (b. 1856)
  - Metropolitan Baselios Paulose I, Indian bishop (b. 1836)
- May 6 – Elena Guro, Russian painter and writer (b. 1877)
- May 8 – Louis Adolphus Duhring, American physician (b. 1845)
- May 16 – Louis Perrier, member of the Swiss Federal Council (b. 1849)
- May 19 – Gabriel Loppé, French painter and photographer (b. 1825)
- May 25 – Alfred Redl, Austrian military intelligence officer, double agent (honorable suicide) (b. 1864)

=== June ===
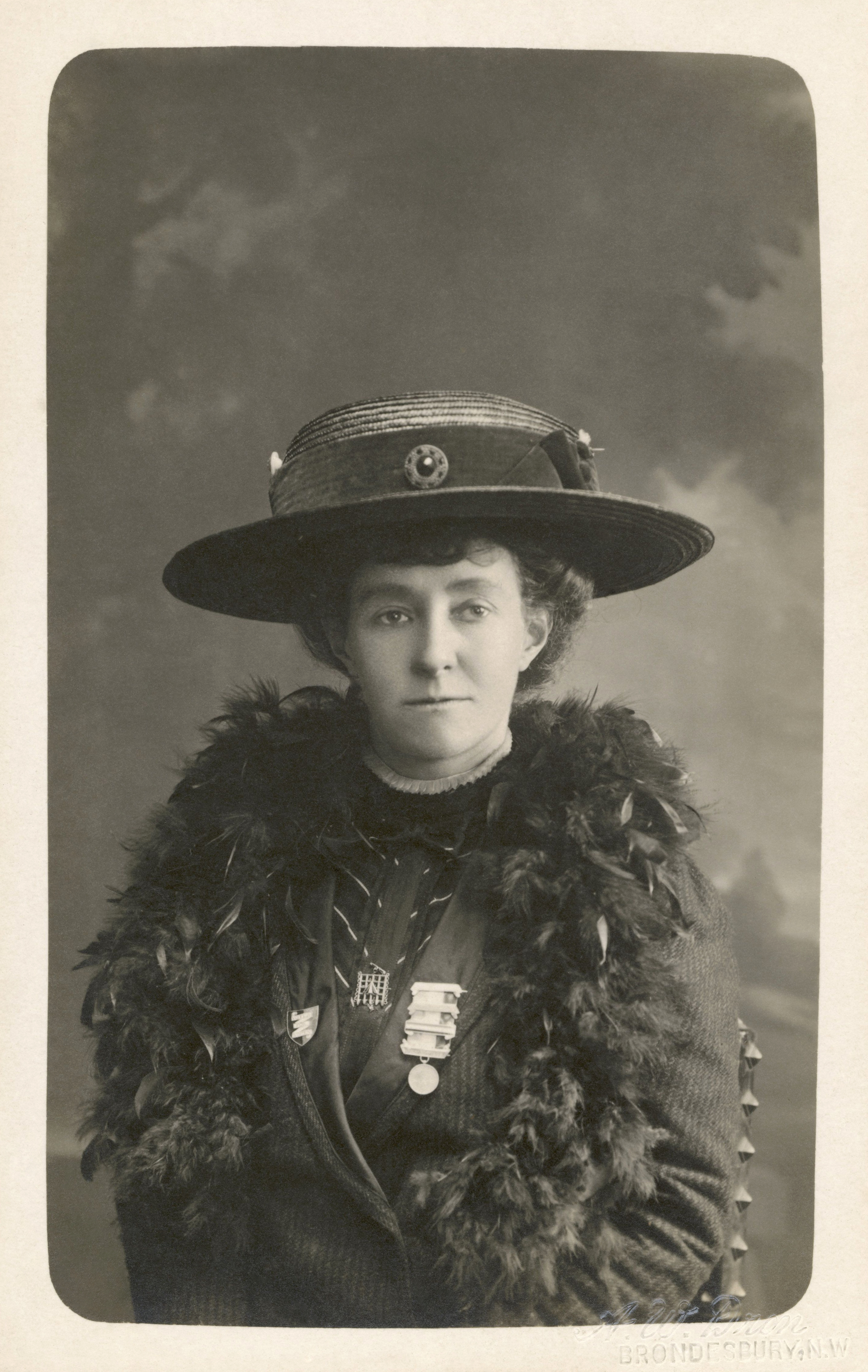
Emily Davison

Nicolás de Piérola

- June 2 – Alfred Austin, English Poet Laureate (b. 1835)
- June 5 – Chris von der Ahe, German-born American brewer, baseball owner (b. 1851)
- June 8 – Emily Davison, English suffragette (b. 1872)
- June 20 – Sydenham E. Ancona, American educator, politician and member of the United States House of Representatives from 1861 to 1867 (b. 1824)
- June 22
  - Ștefan Octavian Iosif, Romanian poet (b. 1875)
  - Victorin-Hippolyte Jasset, French pioneer (b. 1862)
- June 23
  - Nicolás de Piérola, Peruvian politician, 2-time President of Peru (b. 1839)
  - Sir Jonathan Hutchinson, English surgeon (b. 1828)
- June 28 – Manuel Ferraz de Campos Sales, Brazilian lawyer, politician and 4th President of Brazil (b. 1841)

=== July ===
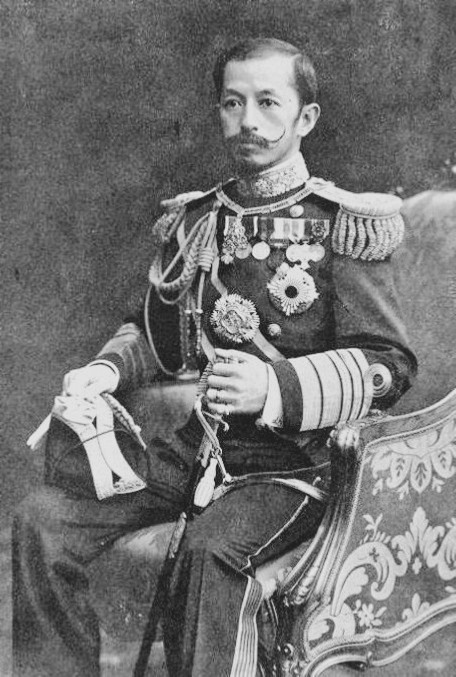
Prince Arisugawa Takehito

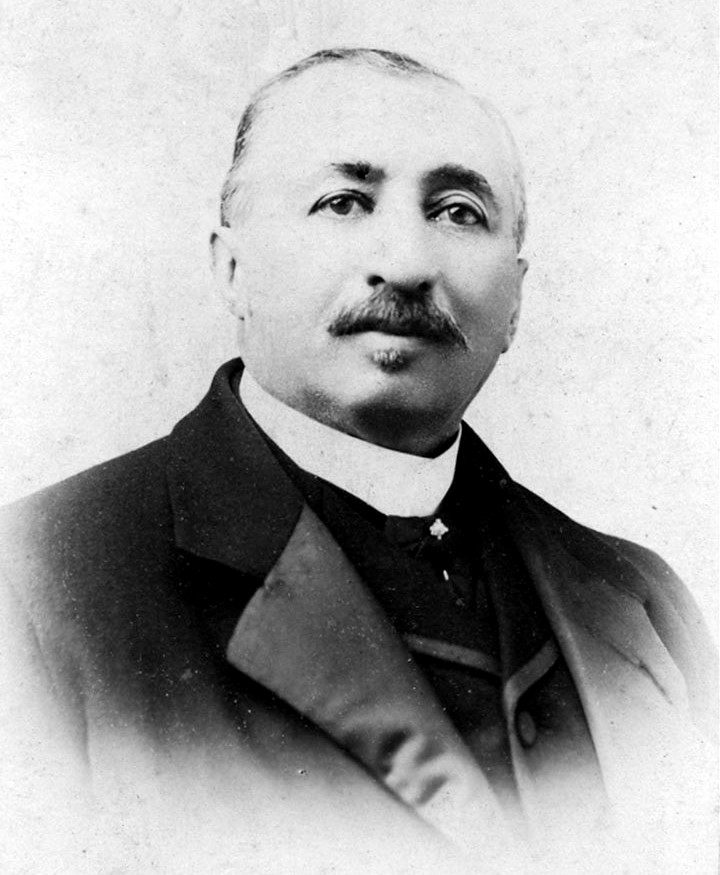
Climaco Calderon

- July 1 – Emanuel M. Abrahams, American politician (b. 1866)
- July 3 – Horatio Nelson Young, American Civil War naval hero (b. 1845)
- July 5 – Prince Arisugawa Takehito (b. 1862)
- July 7 – Edward Burd Grubb Jr., American Union Army officer, diplomat and politician (b. 1841)
- July 10
  - Mikoláš Aleš, Austro-Hungarian painter (b. 1835)
  - John Valentine Ellis, Canadian journalist (b. 1835)
- July 11 – Charles Lavigne, Ceylonese Roman Catholic and Syro-Malabar Catholic bishop and Servant of God (b. 1840)
- July 13 – Edward Burd Grubb Jr., American Civil War Union Brevet Brigadier General (b. 1841)
- July 16 – Sigismund Bachrich, Hungarian composer (b. 1841)
- July 17 – Esther Saville Allen, American author (b. 1837)
- July 19 – Clímaco Calderón, Colombian lawyer, politician and 15th President of Colombia (b. 1852)
- July 20 – Vsevolod Rudnev, Russian admiral (b. 1855)
- July 22
  - Adhémar Esmein, French jurist (b. 1848)
  - Eduardo López Rivas, Venezuelan editor and journalist (b. 1850)
- July 29 – Tobias Asser, Dutch jurist, recipient of the Nobel Peace Prize (b. 1838)
- July 30
  - Lady Alicia Blackwood, English painter (b. 1818)
  - Warren F. Daniell, American politician, U.S. Representative from New Hampshire (b. 1826)
  - Itō Sachio, Japanese poet and novelist (b. 1864)

=== August ===
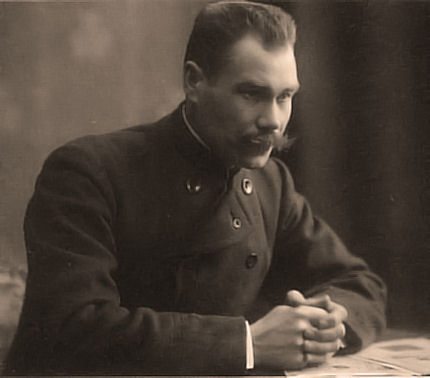
Johannes Linnankoski

- August 3
  - Josephine Cochrane, American inventor of the first commercially successful dishwasher (b. 1839)
  - Joseph Graybill, American actress (b. 1887)
- August 4 – Étienne Laspeyres, German economist (b. 1834)
- August 7 – Samuel Franklin Cody, American-born British aviation pioneer (b. 1867)
- August 9 – Wilhelm Albermann, German sculptor (b. 1835)
- August 10 – Jules Desbrochers des Loges, French entomologist (b. 1836)
- August 11 – Vasily Avseenko, Russian journalist and writer (b. 1842)
- August 13 – August Bebel, German Social Democratic politician (b. 1840)
- August 20 – Émile Ollivier, 24th Prime Minister of France (b. 1825)
- August 22 – Oscar de Négrier, French general (b. 1839)
- August 28 – Fyodor Kamensky, Russian sculptor (b. 1836)
- August 29 – Lars Havstad, Norwegian activist (b. 1851)

=== September ===
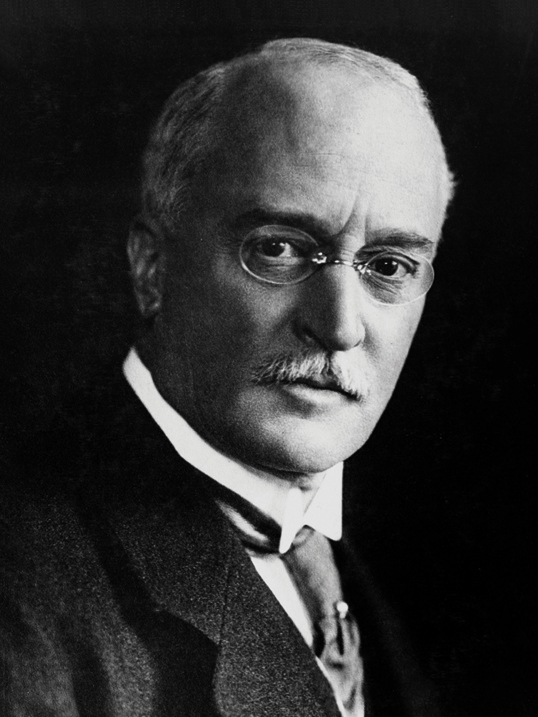
Rudolf Diesel

- September 1 – Patriarch and Metropolitan Lukijan Bogdanović (b. 1867)
- September 9 – Paul de Smet de Naeyer, 16th Prime Minister of Belgium (b. 1843)
- September 13 – Arandzar, Armenian poet and writer (b. 1877)
- September 16 – Julius Lewkowitsch, German engineer (b. 1857)
- September 18 – Prince George Alexandrovich Yuryevsky (b. 1872)
- September 20 – Ferdinand Blumentritt, Filipino author (b. 1853)
- September 29 – Rudolf Diesel, German engine inventor (b. 1858)
- September 30
  - Beatrice Bhadrayuvadi, Siamese princess (b. 1876)
  - Antoni Klawiter, Polish Roman Catholic priest and venerable (b. 1836)

=== October ===
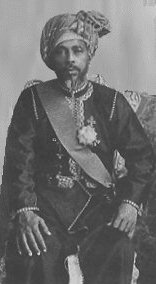
Faisal bin Turki

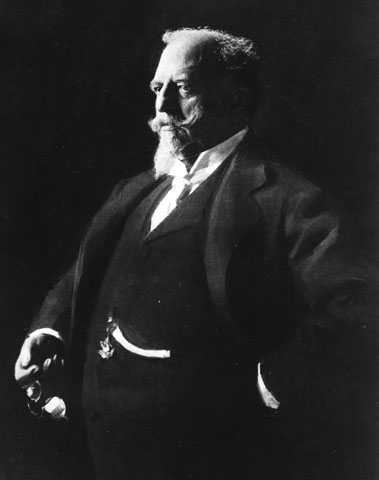
Adolphus Busch

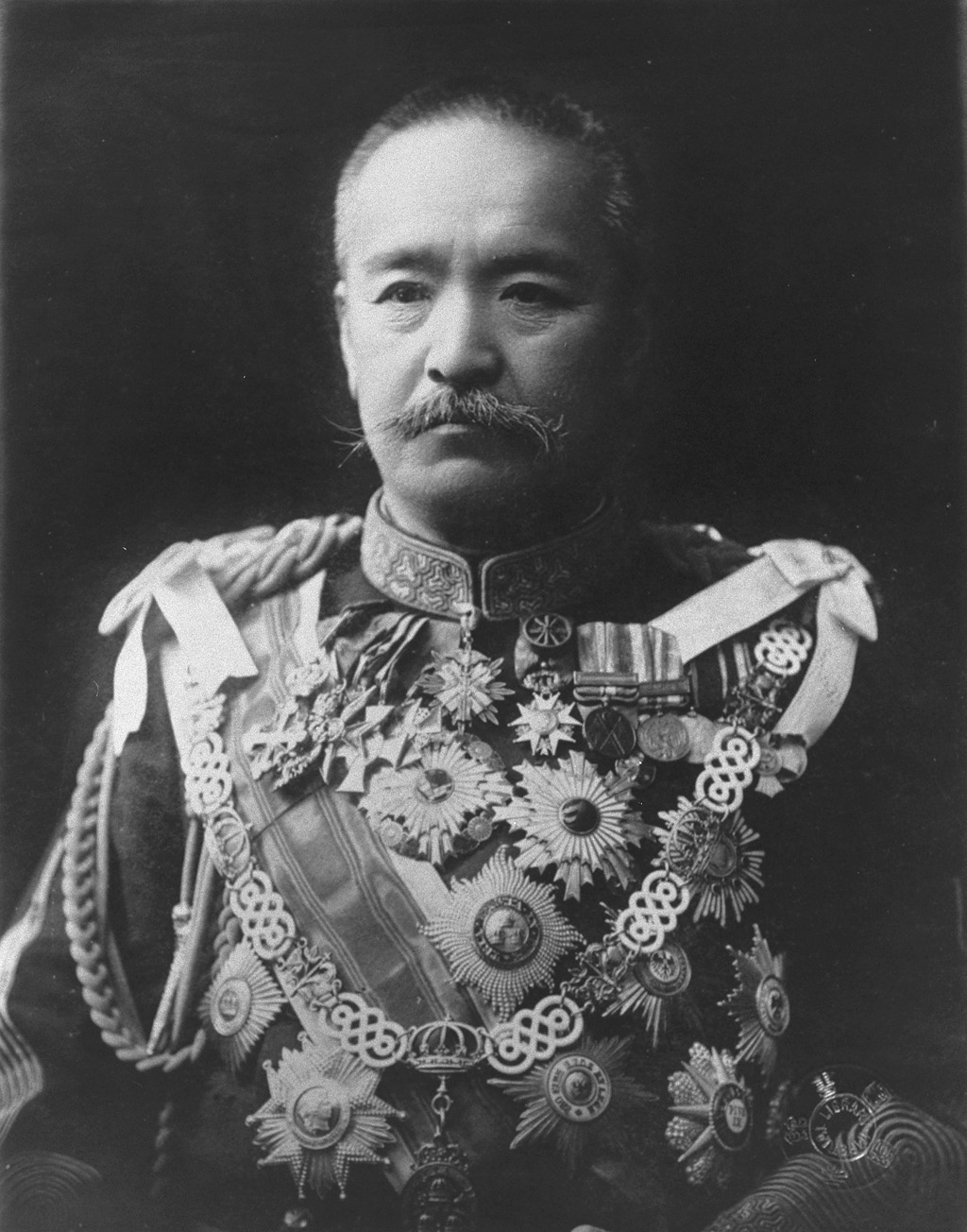
Katsura Tarō

- October 4
  - Josep Tapiró Baró, Spanish painter (b. 1836)
  - Faisal bin Turki, Sultan of Oman (b. 1864)
  - Eleanor Cripps Kennedy, Canadian businessman (b. 1825)
- October 5 – Hans von Bartels, German painter (b. 1856)
- October 7 – Ivan Banjavčić, Croatian politician and philanthropist (b. 1843)
- October 10
  - Adolphus Busch, German-American brewer, co-founder of Anheuser-Busch (b. 1839)
  - Gregorio Maria Aguirre y Garcia, Spanish Roman Catholic cardinal (b. 1835)
  - Katsura Tarō, 6th Prime Minister of Japan (b. 1848)
- October 12 – Elisabeth Leisinger, German soprano (b 1864)
- October 13 – Leonid Sobolev, 6th Prime Minister of Bulgaria (b. 1844)
- October 16 – Ralph Rose, American Olympic athlete (b. 1885)
- October 19 – Charles Tellier, French engineer, inventor of the chemical refrigerator (b. 1828)
- October 20 – Viktor Kirpichov, Russian engineer and physicist (b. 1845)
- October 21 – Theodor Kolde, German Protestant theologian (b. 1850)
- October 29 – Darío de Regoyos, Spanish painter (b. 1857)

=== November ===
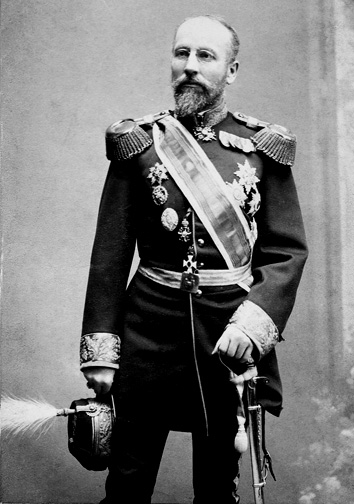
Sava Grujić

- November 3 – Sava Grujić, Serbian diplomat, general and politician, 5-time Prime Minister of Serbia (b. 1840)
- November 4 – Fredericus Anna Jentink, Dutch zoologist (b. 1844)
- November 7 – Alfred Russel Wallace, Welsh biologist (b. 1823)
- November 8 – Ferdinand Abell, American businessman (b. 1835)
- November 21 – Francesco Acri, Italian philosopher (b. 1834)
- November 25 – Haviland Le Mesurier, Australian soldier (b. 1856)

=== December ===
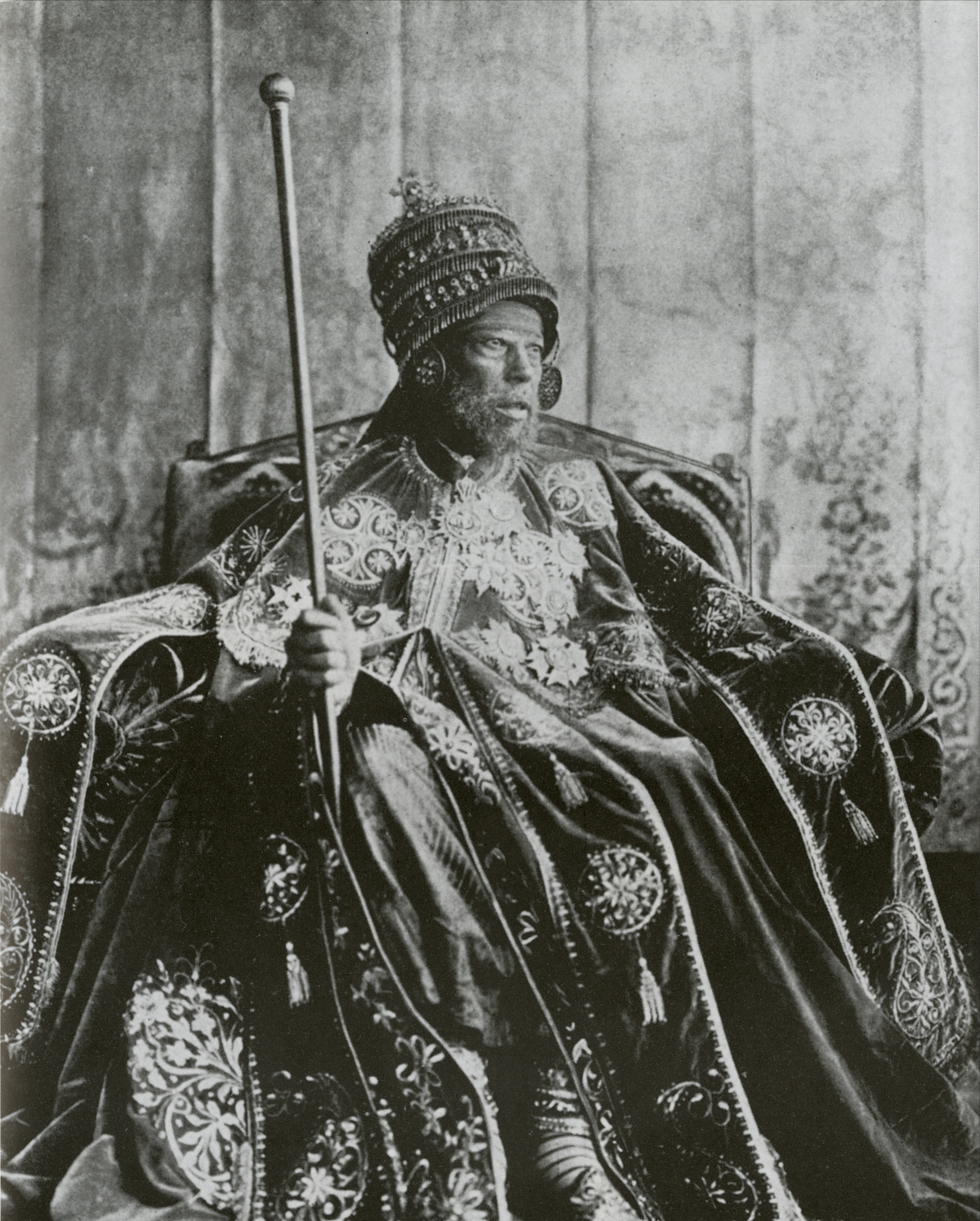
Emperor Menelik II

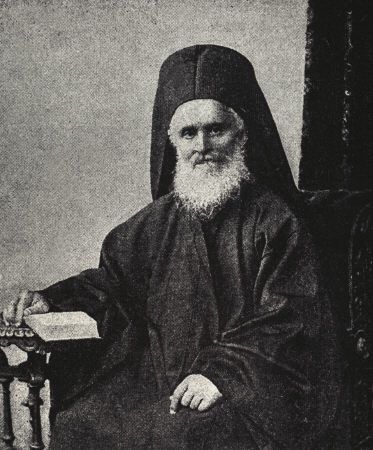
Patriarch Anthimus VII of Constantinople

- December 1
  - Juho Lallukka, Finnish businessman (b. 1852)
  - Juhan Liiv, Estonian poet and short story writer (b. 1864)
- December 5 – Ferdinand Dugué, French playwright (b. 1816)
- December 7
  - Luigi Oreglia di Santo Stefano, Italian Catholic churchman, last surviving cardinal of Pius IX (b. 1828)
  - Aaron Montgomery Ward, American businessman, inventor of mail order (b. 1844)
- December 8 – František Koláček, Austro-Hungarian physicist (b. 1851)
- December 10 – Léon Letort, French aviator (b. 1889)
- December 11
  - Abraham Hirsch, French architect (b. 1828)
  - Carl von In der Maur, Governor of Liechtenstein (b. 1852)
  - Ioan Kalinderu, Romanian jurist (b. 1840)
- December 12 – Menelik II, Emperor of Ethiopia (b. 1844)
- December 13 – Birger Kildal, Norwegian businessman (b. 1849)
- December 15 – Miguel Lebrija, Mexican aviator (b. 1887)
- December 19 – Patriarch Anthimus VII of Constantinople (b. 1827)
- December 25 – Alberto Aguilera, Spanish politician (b. 1842)
- December 26 – Ambrose Bierce, American writer, journalist (disappeared on this date) (b. 1842)
- December 27 – Infanta Antónia of Portugal (b. 1845)
- December 30 – Giovanni Maria Boccardo, Italian Roman Catholic priest and saint (b. 1848)

== Nobel Prizes ==

- Physics – Heike Kamerlingh Onnes
- Chemistry – Alfred Werner
- Medicine – Charles Richet
- Literature – Rabindranath Tagore
- Peace – Henri La Fontaine
