= Abramov =

Abramov (male) and Abramova (female) (the form Abramoff is also used among emigrants) are old Russian surnames originating around the 16th century. Variations of the former calendar name Avraam. The surname was common among all social estates and covered the whole territory of the Russian Empire. Sometimes it derived from patronymic.

It was also adopted by Jews following the Partitions of Poland and usually meant "the son of Abram". As it is not allowed to share the same name as a living father, a son whose father was named Abraham would be called Abram as a stand-in for Abraham.

People with the surname Abramov:

- Alexander Abramov (born 1959), Russian businessman
- Alexander Konstantinovich Abramov (1836–1886), Russian general
- Aleksey Abramov (born 1988), Russian footballer
- Ayala Zacks-Abramov (1912–2011), Israeli-Canadian art collector
- Efrat Abramov (born 1980), Israeli TV presenter and journalist
- Fyodor Abramov (1920–1983), Russian novelist and literary critic
- Georgi Abramov, Russian soloist with the Alexandrov Ensemble
- Ivan Abramov (born 1978), Russian politician
- Ivan A. Abramov, Russian soloist with the Alexandrov Ensemble
- Mikhail Abramov (1963–2019), Russian businessman and art patron. The founder of Museum of Russian Icons
- Nikolay Abramov (1950–2005), Soviet footballer
- Nikolay Abramov (1961–2016), Russian ethnic Vepsian writer, translator, journalist and poet
- Nikolay Abramov (1984–2011), Russian footballer
- Pavel Abramov (born 1979), Russian volleyball player
- Sergei Abramov (born 1957), Russian mathematician
- Vadim Abramov (born 1980), Ukrainian TV presenter
- Valeriy Abramov (1956–2016), Soviet long-distance runner
- Yevda Abramov (1948–2019), Azerbaijani politician
- Yan Abramov (born 1977), an Azerbaijani-born Jewish businessman
- Zalman Abramov (1908–1997), Israeli politician, member of the Knesset
- Barak Abramov (born 1979), Israeli businessman, owner of several Israeli football clubs

People with the surname Abramova:

- Nina Abramova (born 1949), Russian rower
- Olga Abramova (disambiguation), multiple people
- Yekaterina Abramova (born 1982), Russian speed skater

People with the surname Abramoff:

- Jack Abramoff (born 1958), American political lobbyist, served prison time for fraud
- Michael Abramoff (born 1963), American ophthalmologist

Other:

- Abramov, Volgograd Oblast
