= Abram (name) =

Abram is a male given name of Akkadian origin, meaning exalted father in much later languages. In the Tanakh, it was originally the name of the first of the three Biblical patriarchs, who later became known as Abraham.

== Russian name ==
The Russian language borrowed the name from Byzantine Christianity, but its popularity, along with other Biblical first names, declined by the mid-19th century. "Абра́м" (Abram) has historically been the most popular colloquial variant of the Russian Orthodox ecclesiastical name "Авраа́м" (Avraam), with other common forms being "Авраа́мий" (Avraamy), and "Авра́мий" (Avramy). Other colloquial forms included "Абра́мий" (Abramy), "Авра́м" (Avram), and "Обра́м" (Obram). Until the end of the 19th century, the official Synodal Menologium also included the form "Абраха́м" (Abrakham).

The patronymics derived from "Abram" are "Абра́мович" (Abramovich; masculine) and its colloquial form "Абра́мыч" (Abramych), and "Абра́мовна" (Abramovna; feminine). The patronymics derived from "Abramy" are "Абра́миевич" (Abramiyevich; masculine) and "Абра́миевна" (Abramiyevna; feminine). The patronymics derived from "Avraam" are "Авраа́мович" (Avraamovich; masculine) and "Авраа́мовна" (Avraamovna; feminine). The patronymics derived from "Avraamy" are "Авраа́миевич" (Avraamiyevich; masculine) and "Авраа́миевна" (Avraamiyevna; feminine). The patronymics derived from "Avram" are "Авра́мович" (Avramovich; masculine) and "Авра́мовна" (Avramovna; feminine). The patronymics derived from "Avraamy" are "Авраа́миевич" (Avraamiyevich; masculine) and "Авраа́миевна" (Avraamiyevna; feminine).

The diminutives of "Avraam" and "Avraamy" include "Авраа́мка" (Avraamka), "Авра́мка" (Avramka), "Авраа́ха" (Avraakha), "Авра́ха" (Avrakha), "Авраа́ша" (Avraasha), and "Авра́ша" (Avrasha). The diminutives of "Abram" include "Абра́мка" (Abramka), "Абра́ха" (Abrakha), and "Абра́ша" (Abrasha). The diminutives of "Avram" include "Авра́мка" (Avramka), "Авра́ха" (Avrakha), "Авра́ша" (Avrasha), and "А́ва" (Ava).

== People with the given name Abram ==
- Abram Piatt Andrew (Jr.) (1873–1936), United States Representative from Massachusetts
- Abram Samoilovich Besicovitch (Bezikovich) (1891–1970), Russian mathematician
- Abram Blass (born 1895), Polish-Israeli chess master
- Abram Bergson (1914–2003), American economist
- Abram Chasins (1903–1987), American composer, pianist, piano teacher, lecturer, musicologist, music broadcaster, radio executive and author
- Abram Comingo (1820–1889), Democratic Representative
- Abram Duryée (1815–1890), Union Army general
- Abram Elam (born 1981), American football safety
- Abram Ellenbogen (1883–1929), American lawyer, politician, and judge
- Abram P. Fardon (1837–1913), American politician from Washington, D.C.
- Abram Fitkin (1878–1933) American minister, businessman and philanthropist
- Abram Fulkerson (1834–1902), Confederate officer
- Abram Petrovich Gannibal (1696–1781), Afro-Russian nobleman, military engineer and general of Ethiopian origin
- Abram Grushko (1918–1980), Russian painter and art teacher
- Abram D. Harlan (1833–1908), American politician from Pennsylvania
- Abram Harris, multiple people
- Abram Harrison (1898–1979), Canadian politician
- Abram Stevens Hewitt (1822–1903), teacher, lawyer, iron manufacturer, and chairman
- Abram Hoffer (1917–2009), Canadian psychiatrist
- Abram Fedorovich Ioffe (1860–1960), prominent Russian/Soviet physicist
- Abram Jakira (1889–1931), American socialist political activist, newspaper editor, and Communist Party functionary
- Abram Kofman (1865–1940), Russian Esperantist poet
- Abram Lyle (1820–1891), Scottish businessman
- Abram F. Myers (born 1889), chair of the Federal Trade Commission and later general counsel and board chairman of the Allied States Association of Motion Picture Exhibitors
- Abram Rabinovich (1878–1943), Lithuanian–Russian chess master
- (Abram) Harding "Hardy" Richardson (1855–1931), second baseman and outfielder
- Abram Joseph Ryan (1839–1886), American poet, proponent of the Confederate States of America, and Roman Catholic priest
- Abram Saperstein, changed his name to Albert Sabin (1906–1993), Polish-American medical researcher who developed an oral polio vaccine; President of the Weizmann Institute of Science
- Abram Smith (disambiguation), multiple people
- Abram Trigg (born 1750), American farmer and politician

== Variant forms ==
- Abraham (Avraham, Avrohom, also Avrohum, Avrohim, Avruhom, Avrihom, Avruhum, Ibrahim), list of people
- Avram (Avrom, Avrum)
- Abrams
- Abramson, Abramsson
- Abramov, and Abramowicz (Abramovich, Abramowitz), etc. (Slavic, Russianised form)
- Abramczyk (surname)
- Abraomas, Abromaitis (surname), Abrameit, Abromeit (Baltic forms)
- Bram, Brams, Brahm, Brahms, etc.
  - (not to be confused with the Hindu word Brahman)
- Abiram, another Hebrew-origin given name

== See also ==
- Abram (surname)

== Sources ==
- В. А. Никонов (V. A. Nikonov). "Ищем имя" (Looking for a Name). Изд. "Советская Россия". Москва, 1988. ISBN 5-268-00401-8
- Н. А. Петровский (N. A. Petrovsky). "Словарь русских личных имён" (Dictionary of Russian First Names). ООО Издательство "АСТ". Москва, 2005. ISBN 5-17-002940-3
- [1] А. В. Суперанская (A. V. Superanskaya). "Современный словарь личных имён: Сравнение. Происхождение. Написание" (Modern Dictionary of First Names: Comparison. Origins. Spelling). Айрис-пресс. Москва, 2005. ISBN 5-8112-1399-9
- [2] А. В. Суперанская (A. V. Superanskaya). "Словарь русских имён" (Dictionary of Russian Names). Издательство Эксмо. Москва, 2005. ISBN 5-699-14090-5
