= Abraham (surname) =

Abraham is a surname. It can be of Jewish, English, French, German, Dutch, Irish, Welsh, Cornish, Breton, Lebanese, Syrian and other origins. It is derived from the Hebrew personal name Avraham, borne by the biblical patriarch Abraham, revered by Jews as a founding father of the Jewish people (Gen. 11-25), and by Muslims as founder of all Semitic peoples (see Abraham). The name is explained in Genesis 17:5 as being derived from the Hebrew av hamon goyim "father of a multitude of nations". It was commonly used as a given name among Christians in the Middle Ages, and has always been a popular Jewish given name. The English name Abram is often a short form of Abraham, but it can also be a shortened version of Adburgham, which comes from a place name. As an Irish name, it was adopted as an approximation (in sound, not meaning) of the Gaelic name Mac an Bhreitheamhan "son of the judge". The German name Brahm is often a short form of Abraham, but it can also be a topographic name signifying someone who lived near a bramble thicket (from the Middle High German brāme). The name Braham has been used as an anglicisation of both Abraham and its patronymic Abrahams by Ashkenazi Jews in the British Isles (see Braham). Abraham has also been used as an anglicisation of the equivalent Arabic surname Ibrāhīm (see Ibrahim). It is also found as a given name among Christians in India, and has come to be used as a family name among families from Kerala.

== List of people with the surname ==
Notable people with the surname include:

- Abraham Abraham (1843–1911), American department store magnate
- Abu Abraham (1924–2002), Indian cartoonist
- Alan Abraham (1931–2020), Canadian politician
- Andy Abraham (born 1964), English vocalist
- Ann Abraham (born 1952), British ombudsman
- Arthur Abraham (born 1980), German boxer
- Ben Abraham (writer) (born Henryk Nekrycz; 1924–2001), Polish-born Brazilian writer and historian
- Ben Abraham (musician) (born 1985), Australian folk singer and songwriter
- Brad Abraham (contemporary), Canadian-born screenwriter, author, journalist, producer, and comic book creator
- Brian Abraham (born 1984), American professional baseball front-office executive and former coach
- Caroline Abraham (1809–1877), New Zealand artist
- Carolyn Abraham (born 1968), British-born Canadian freelance journalist and author
- Charles Abraham (bishop of Derby) (1857–1945), second suffragan Bishop of Derby
- Charles Abraham (bishop of Wellington) (1814–1903), first Anglican Bishop of Wellington, New Zealand
- Clifton Abraham (born 1971), professional American football player
- Corinne Abraham (born 1977), professional British triathlete
- Damian Abraham (born 1979), Canadian punk rock singer and podcast host
- Dan Abraham (born 1970), American film director, screenwriter and animator
- Daniel Abraham (author) (born 1969), science fiction and fantasy author
- Daniel Abraham (conductor) (born 1968), director of The Bach Sinfonia and choral activities at American University
- Daniel Abraham (rugby league) (born 1981), Australian rugby league footballer
- David Abraham (television executive) (born 1963), British television executive
- David Abraham (footballer) (born 1986), Argentine association football player
- Derek Abraham (born 1953), Dominica-born Canadian cricketer
- Donnie Abraham (born 1973), American football coach and former player
- Dustin Lee Abraham (contemporary), American actor
- Edward Abraham (1913–1999), British biochemist
- Emile Abraham (born 1974), Trinidad and Tobago cyclist
- Erich Abraham (1895–1971), German infantry general
- Erich Abraham (soldier) (1921–1943), German soldier, recipient of the Knight's Cross of the Iron Cross
- Evan Abraham (1901–1990), Welsh footballer
- Ezrela Abraham (born 2003), Australian dancer and contestant of Dream Academy
- F. Murray Abraham (born 1939), American actor
- Farid F. Abraham (born 1937), American physicist
- Farrah Abraham (born 1991), American reality television personality
- Fred Abraham Sr. (1859–1901/18), British Guyanese cricketer
- Fred Abraham Jr. (1886–1918), British Guyanese cricketer
- Gareth Abraham (born 1969), Welsh association football player
- George and Ashley Abraham (1871–1965) (1876–1951), British climbers and photographers
- G. P. Abraham (1844–1923), British photographer, postcard publisher, and mountaineer
- Henri Abraham (1868–1943), French physicist
- Henry J. Abraham (1921–2020), American legal scholar
- Henry David Abraham (born 1942), American psychiatrist, co-recipient of the 1985 Nobel Peace Prize
- Hérard Abraham (1940–2022), Haitian politician
- Izzy Abraham (born 1980), American football coach
- Jake Abraham (1967–2023), British actor
- Jay Abraham (born 1949), American business executive, conference speaker, and author
- Jenő Ábrahám (1903–1973), Hungarian and Yugoslav football player
- John Abraham (born 1972), Indian model and Bollywood actor
- John Abraham (American football) (born 1978), American football player
- John Abraham (director) (1937–1987), Indian film director
- John Abraham (politician) (fl. 1672–1689), British governor
- John Abraham (engineer), American engineering professor, climate science lecturer and debater
- Jolly Abraham, Indian singer
- Josef Abrhám (1939–2022), Czech film and theatre actor
- Josh Abraham, American music producer
- Karel Abraham (born 1990), Czech motorcycle racer
- Karl Abraham (1877–1925), German psychoanalyst
- Katharine Abraham (born 1954), American economist
- K. A. Abraham (1942–2021), Indian cardiologist and medical writer
- Knut Abraham (born 1966), German politician
- Larry H. Abraham (1939–2008), American author
- Lucienne Abraham (1916–1970), French Trotskyist politician
- Lynne Abraham (born 1941), American lawyer and judge
- Marc Abraham, American film producer and director
- Mark Abraham (born 1953), American politician
- Max Abraham (1875–1922), German physicist
- Max Abraham (publisher) (1831–1900), German music publisher
- Micah Abraham (born 2000), American football player
- Michael Abraham (chemist) (1931–2021), British chemist
- Nicolas Abraham (1919–1975), Hungarian psychoanalyst
- Patrick Abraham, American arrested on terrorism-related offenses
- Paul Abraham (1892–1960), Serbian operetta composer
- Pearl Abraham (born 1960), Israeli-American novelist, essayist and short story writer
- Phil Abraham, American cinematographer and television director
- Philip Abraham (1803–1890), English writer and educator
- Philip Abraham (1897–1955), Anglican Bishop of Newfoundland
- Pierre Abraham (1892–1974), French journalist, essayist, and military figure in the French Air Force during the world wars
- Pol Abraham (1891–1966), French architect
- Raimund Abraham (1933–2010), Austrian architect and artist
- Raju Abraham (born 1961), Indian politician
- Ralph Abraham (mathematician) (1936–2024), American mathematician and professor
- Ralph Abraham (politician) (born 1954), American politician
- Reji Abraham, Indian businessman
- Robert Abraham (American football) (born 1960), professional American football player
- Robert Abraham (architect) (1773–1850), London architect
- Roberto Abraham (born 1965), Canadian astronomer and professor
- Roman Abraham (1897–1976), Polish World War II general, son of Władysław Abraham
- Ronny Abraham (born 1951), French judge
- Samuel Abrahám (born 1960), Slovak academic administrator
- S. Daniel Abraham (1924–2025), American businessman
- Segun Abraham (born 1953), Nigerian politician and businessman
- Sheelu Abraham, Indian actress
- Shiny Abraham (born 1965), Indian Olympic athlete
- Spencer Abraham (born 1952), U.S. Senator from Michigan
- Stephen Abraham, American lawyer and officer in the United States Army Reserve
- Tajama Abraham (born 1975), American basketball player in the Women's National Basketball Association and coach
- Tammy Abraham (born 1997), English professional footballer
- Tancrède Abraham (1836–1895), French landscape painter and engraver
- Thomas Abraham (cricketer) (1838–1873), English cricketer
- Tomáš Abrahám (born 1979), Czech football player
- Tuulikki Abraham (born 1969), Namibian politician
- Walter Abraham (1923–2006), Australian architect and town planner
- William Abraham (bishop) (1792–1837), Roman Catholic Bishop of Waterford and Lismore
- William Abraham (Irish politician) (1840–1915), Irish Member of Parliament
- William Abraham (British Army officer) (1897–1980), British Army officer
- William Abraham (trade unionist) (1842–1922), Welsh politician
- William Emmanuel Abraham (born 1934), Ghanaian philosopher
- William J. Abraham (1947–2021), Irish theologian, analytic philosopher, and United Methodist pastor
- William James Abraham (1883–1927), British trade unionist and politician, president of the National Union of Railwaymen (NUR)
- Winston Abraham (born 1974), Australian rules football player
- Władysław Abraham (1860–1941), Polish lawyer and academic, father of Roman Abraham
- Wolfgang Abraham (1942–2013), German association football player
- Xavier Abraham (born 1945), Catalan poet, cultural activist, and bookseller

== See also ==
- Abraham, the biblical patriarch
- Abraham in Islam

== Bibliography ==
- Hanks, Patrick, Dictionary of American Family Names (2003), Oxford University Press, ISBN 0-19-508137-4
- Hanks, Patrick and Flavia Hodges, Oxford Dictionary of Names, (1988), Oxford University Press, ISBN 0-19-211592-8
