= Abrams (surname) =

Abrams is a surname related to Abrahams, Abram, Abrahm and Abraham. It developed independently in the Jewish diaspora, England, Germany and the Netherlands. The name and its variants have been found in England since the medieval era in the Domesday Book and Hundred Rolls. As of 2014, it is most commonly found in the United States. Notable people with the surname include:

- A. J. Abrams (born 1986), American basketball player
- Albert Abrams (1863–1924), American physician
- Aliyah Abrams (born 1997), Guyanese athletic sprinter
- Aruna Abrams (born 1975), American singer
- Austin Abrams (born 1996), American actor
- Cal Abrams (1924–1997), American baseball player
- Carol Ann Abrams (1942–2012), American television and film producer
- Charles Abrams (1901–1970), Polish-American lawyer
- CJ Abrams (born 2000), American baseball player
- Creighton Williams Abrams (1914–1974), American army officer
- Dan Abrams (born 1966), American television talk show host
- Delrick Abrams (born 1997), American football player
- Elliott Abrams (born 1948), American foreign policy official
- Elliot Abrams (meteorologist) (born 1947), American meteorologist
- Floyd Abrams (born 1936), American attorney
- Geoff Abrams (born 1978), American tennis player
- Gerald W. Abrams (born 1939), American television producer
- Gracie Abrams (born 1999), American singer-songwriter
- Harry N. Abrams, American book publisher
- Herbert Abrams (1921–2003), American painter
- Herbert L. Abrams (1920–2006), American doctor
- Israel Abrams (born 2008), American football player
- J. J. Abrams (born 1966), American filmmaker and composer
- James Atkinson Abrams (1844–1914), Canadian politician
- James W. Abrams, American judge and politician
- John Abrams (field hockey) (born 1934), New Zealand field hockey player
- John N. Abrams (1946–2018), American army officer
- Kevin Abrams (disambiguation), multiple people
- LeRoy Abrams (1874–1956), American botanist
- Link Abrams (born 1973), American-New Zealand basketball player
- Mark Abrams (1906–1994), English social scientist
- Mary Abrams (1958–2025), American politician in Connecticut
- Max Abrams (1907–1995), British drummer
- Melville E. Abrams (1912–1966), New York politician
- M. H. Abrams (1912–2015), American literary critic
- Mike Abrams (psychologist) (born 1953), American psychologist and author
- Minnie F. Abrams (1859-1912), American missionary to India
- Morris Abrams (1908–1981), American inventor
- Oscar Abrams (1937–1996), Guyanese architect, theatre designer, and community organiser
- Richard Abrams (disambiguation), multiple people
- Robert Abrams (born 1938), American politician
- Robert B. Abrams (born 1960), American general
- Roz Abrams (born 1948), American television journalist
- Ruth Abrams (1930–2019), American judge
- Sam Abrams (1935–2023), American poet
- Stacey Abrams (born 1973), American politician and author
- Stephen Abrams (1938–2012), American scholar and activist
- Steve Abrams (born 1949), American politician
- William Abrams (1785–1844), English businessman
- W. J. Abrams (1829–1900), American businessman and politician

== See also ==
- Abrams (disambiguation)
- Abram (name)
