= Fardon =

Fardon is a surname. Notable people with the surname include:

- Abram P. Fardon (1837–1913), American politician from Washington, D.C.
- Edward Langley Fardon (1839–1926), English engineer
- Daniel Fardon (1991), British composer
- Don Fardon (born 1940), English singer
- Zachary T. Fardon (born 1966), American lawyer from Illinois

== See also ==
- Fardon v Attorney-General (Qld)
