= Abraham (disambiguation) =

Abraham is the common Hebrew patriarch of the Abrahamic religions, including Judaism, Christianity, and Islam.

Abraham may also refer to:

== People ==
- Abraham (given name), including a list of people with the given name Abraham
- Abraham (surname), including a list of people with the surname Abraham

== Places ==
- Abraham, West Virginia, U.S.
- Abraham, Utah, U.S.
- Abraham Mountain, Alberta, Canada
- Abraham Lake, Alberta, Canada
- Abrahám, Trnava Region, Slovakia
- Mount Abraham (disambiguation)

== Arts and entertainment ==
- Abraham (1993 film), a TV film
- Abraham (2015 film), a South African film
- Abraham (album), by Mohsen Chavoshi, 2018
- Abraham, a 2002 book by Bruce Feiler
- Abraham (Hrotsvitha play), by Hrotsvit of Grandersheim (c. 935–973)

== Other uses ==
- Abraham Catalogue of Belgian Newspapers, an online catalogue of Belgian historical newspapers
- Abraham (aircraft manufacturer), a French company in the 1930s

== See also ==
- Abrahamson, a surname
- Abram (disambiguation)
- Avraham (disambiguation)
- Avram (disambiguation)
- Ibrahim (disambiguation)
- Abraham Accords, diplomatic agreements between the Israel, Bahrain and the UAE
- Abraham Lincoln (disambiguation)
