= Abram (disambiguation) =

Abram is the Biblical patriarch.

Abram may also refer to:

- Abram (name) (includes variant forms and other people with this name)
- Abram, Łódź Voivodeship, a village in Poland
- Abram, Bihor, a commune in west Romania
- Abram, Greater Manchester, a village in England, UK
  - Abram (ward), an electoral ward in Wigan, England, UK
- Abram, Texas, United States
- M1 Abrams a battle tank
- Abram (color), a hair colour

== See also ==
- Abraham (disambiguation)
- Abrams
- Avram (disambiguation)
