= Avraham (disambiguation) =

Avraham (Hebrew: אַבְרָהָם) is the Hebrew name of Abraham, patriarch of the Abrahamic religions.

Avraham may also refer to:

- Avraham (given name)
- Avraham (surname)

== See also ==
- Abraham (disambiguation)
- Avram (disambiguation)
- Ibrahim (disambiguation)
