= Avramenko =

- Language: Ukrainian

Origin
- Meaning: It derived from a given name Abraham

Other names
- Variant form: Abrahamovsky

Avramenko (Ukrainian: Авраменко) is a Ukrainian surname. The surname derived from Hebrew name Abram (Ruthenian version Avram) by adding a Ukrainian suffix "-enko". Abram is itself derived from Abraham.

It may refer to:

- Gennadi Avramenko (born 1965), Ukrainian sport shooter
- Halyna Avramenko (born 1986), Ukrainian sport shooter
- Roman Avramenko (born 1988), Ukrainian javelin thrower
- Vasyl Avramenko (1895–1981), Ukrainian actor, dancer, choreographer, balletmaster, director, and film producer
