= Thomas Abraham (disambiguation) =

Thomas Abraham (born 1948) is an Indian-American businessman and civic leader.

Thomas Abraham may also refer to:

- Thomas Abraham (cricketer), (1838–1873), English cricket player
- Tomáš Abrahám (born 1979), Czech footballer
- Thomas Abrahams (born 1946), South African politician

== See also ==
- Abraham Thomas (disambiguation)
