= Abramczyk =

Abramczyk (also rendered as Abramcyk, Abramchik, Abramczik, and Abramchyk) is a Slavic surname of distant Jewish origin, most predominantly coming from Poland, and nowadays met mainly among Polish Roman Catholics. It is a patronymic surname derived from a Hebrew name 'Abram' – the original name of the biblical figure Abraham, with the help of the Ruthenian patronymic siffix '-chik'.

Notable persons with the surname include:

- Barbara Morcinek-Abramczyk (born 1970), Polish literary scholar
- Halina Abramczyk (born 1951), Polish physicist and chemist
- Józef Abramczyk (1912–2001), Polish activist
- Mikola Abramchyk (1903–1970), Belarusian politician
- Rüdiger Abramczik (born 1956), German football player and coach
- Volker Abramczik (born 1964), German football player
