= FC Sokol Seltso =

Russian football club

Sokol
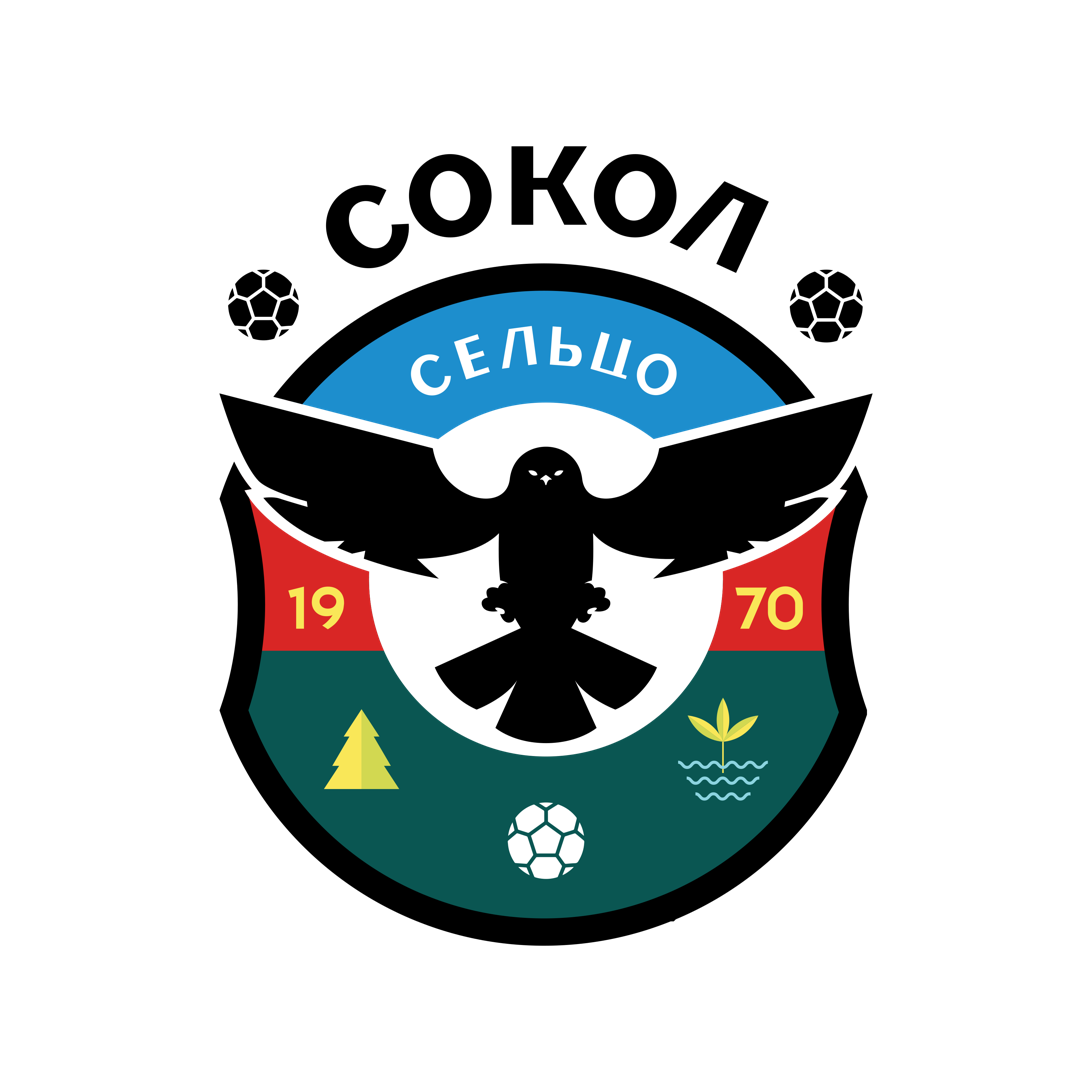
- Full name: Football Club Sokol Seltso
- Founded: 1970; 56 years ago
- Ground: Sokol Stadium, Seltso
- Capacity: 869
- Chairman: Vasilii Oreshkin
- Manager: Nikolay Emelyanov
- League: Bryansk Region Football Championship, First Division
- 2024: 5th of 16
- Website: boff32.nagradion.ru/tournament38074/team/348943/players

Sokol Seltso (Russian: "Сокол" Сельцо) is a Russian football club from the city of Seltso, Bryansk region. Since 1970, it has been competing in the Bryansk Region football Championship. It was a two-time champion of the Bryansk region (1991, 1999) and also the winner of the Regional Cups (1999, 2010, 2016).

== History ==
The Sokol Football Club was founded in 1970. In 1980, Sokol played a friendly match at the Seltso stadium with veterans of the USSR team, with notable footballers as Eduard Streltsov, Vladimir Maslachenko, Evgeny Lovchev, and other footballers.

In 1981, the football team, led by coach Arkady Khachatryan, won the right to play in the first group of the regional championship and since then never left it.

In 1991, under the guidance of coach A. Takranov, it became the champion of the Bryansk region.

In 1993, under the leadership of coach Vladimir Pavlenko, the Sokol football team took third place in the Bryansk Region Championship, and in 1997 retained it again under coach Boris Vasilyev.

In 1999, the team under the leadership of coaches Vladimir Frolenkov and Boris Vasilyev for the first time made «gold» double, winning the Cup and becoming the champion of the Bryansk region.

In 2001, Sokol (coach Valery Sidorenko) won the third place in the regional championship.

In 2007, Nikolay Yemelyanov became the head coach of the team, in 2008 the Sokol football club won bronze medals, and in 2010 — bronze medals and the Bryansk Region Cup.

In 2016, Sokol became the silver medalist of the Bryansk Region Championship and the winner of the Bryansk Region Cup.

In 2019 and 2021, the Sokol football club became the final of the Cup of the region.

In April 2022, Vasilii Igorevich Oreshkin became the president of the Sokol Seltso football club.

Since the season 2023, the team Sokol U21 Seltso has been revived.

On July 20, 2024, as part of the Bryansk Region championship, André Santos, a member of the Brazilian national team, and a player of the English Arsenal football club, played for the Sokol club against Avangard from Kletni. He played 90 minutes, was remembered for his high level of play, shot dangerously at goal several times, and after his long-range free kick, striker Gerasimov finished the ball from 2 meters into the goal after the goalkeeper's save. The match ended with a 3-0 victory for Sokol.

On August 24, 2025, in a match against FC Sputnik, the team captain Mikhail Medvedev set a historic Bryansk Region Championship record: he has been scoring goals for 27 consecutive seasons in the First Division of the Bryansk Region Championship.

== Club management ==
President of FC Sokol Seltso:

- Oreshkin Vasilii Igorevich

Head Coach:

- Emelyanov Nikolay Nikolaevich

Technical Director:

- Aniskin Ilia Alexandrovich

Team administrators:

- Serdyagin Vasily Pavlovich
- Tachkov Alexander Stepanovich

Spokesman:

- Anastasiya Shitikova

== Current squad (season 2024) ==
1. Alexey Abramov, 31 years old. Goalkeeper

2. Valery Avetisyan, 22 years old. Midfielder

3 . Vitaly Balabanov, 28 years old. Defender

4. Evgeniy Borisov, 29 years old. Midfielder

5. Alexander Gerasimov, 27 years old. Striker

6. Dos Santos Andre Clarindo, 41 years old. Defender

7. Ilya Yemelyanov, 31 years old. Midfielder

8. Vladislav Ershov, 28 years old. Striker

9. Ivan Zhivykh, 24 years old. Striker

10. Dmitry Isachenko, 29 years old. Striker

11. Andrey Kenzir, 29 years old. Defender

12. Mikhail Medvedev, 43 years old. Midfielder

13. Oleg Nikitin, 27 years old. Defender

14. Vasilii Oreshkin, 36 years old. Striker

15. Roman Petrukhin, 40 years old. Goalkeeper

16. Roman Redko, 23 years old. Striker

17. Dmitry Romantsov, 32 years old. Defender

18. Dmitry Rybakin, 41 years old. Defender

19. Vadim Seregin, 28 years old. Defender

20. Eugeniy Sinitsa, 33 years old. Midfielder

21. Vyacheslav Shpakov, 24 years old. Midfielder

22. Pavel Shchelokov, 33 years old. Goalkeeper
