= Avram (surname) =

Avram is a surname. It is related to the surname Abram, which means exalted father. People with the surname Avram include:

- Alexandru Avram (born 1991), Romanian footballer
- Andreas Avraam (born 1987), Cypriot football player
- Ben Avram (born 1941), Indian Israeli painter
- Constantin Avram (1911–1987), Romanian engineer
- Elli Avram (born 1990), Swedish-Greek actress
- Henriette Avram (1919–2006), computer programmer and systems analyst
- Herbert Avram (1913–2006), American chess player
- Ioanna Avraam, Cypriot ballet dancer
- Ionuț Avram (born 1979), Romanian footballer
- Răzvan Avram (born 1986), Romanian footballer
- Sorin Avram (1943–2015), Romanian football player and coach

== See also ==
- Avram (given name)
