= Abromeit =

Abromeit is a patronymic surname. It means "son of Abrom", "Abraomas" (Lithuanian article), or "Abraham" in Baltic language. People with this surname include:

- Franz Abromeit (1907–1964), Nazi SS officer
- Fritz Abromeit (1923–2004), German footballer
- Johannes Abromeit (1857–1946), German botanist
- Jutta Abromeit (born 1959), German rower

== See also ==
- Abromaitis, Lithuanian form
