= Avram (disambiguation) =

Avram or Abraham is the founding patriarch of the Israelites, Ishmaelites, Midianites and Edomite peoples.

Avram may also refer to:

- Avram (given name), a masculine given name
- Avram (surname), a surname
- Grand Duchy of Avram, a micronation in Australia

== See also ==
- Abram (disambiguation)
- Abraham (disambiguation)
- Avraham (disambiguation)
