= Avrom =

Avrom is a variant form of the masculine given name Abram. Notable people with the name include:

- Avrom Ber Gotlober (1811–1899), Jewish writer, poet, playwright, historian, journalist, and educator
- Avrom Isaacs, CM (1926–2016), Canadian art dealer
- Avrom Stencl (1897–1983), Yiddish poet
- Avrom Yanovsky (1911–1979), Canadian editorial cartoonist
