= Ibrahim =

Ibrahim may refer to:

- Ibrahim (name), including a list of people with the name
  - Abraham in Islam
- Ibrahim (surah), a surah of the Qur'an
- Ibrahim (play) or Ibrahim The Illustrious Bassa, a 1676 tragedy by Elkanah Settle, based on a 1641 novel by Madeleine de Scudéry
- Ibrahim Prize for Achievement in African Leadership

== See also ==
- Ibrahimzai, a Pashtun tribe of Afghanistan
- Ibrahima, a male given name
- Abraham (disambiguation)
- Avraham (disambiguation)
- Ibrahim el Awal, an Egyptian navy destroyer
