= Avraham (surname) =

Avraham is a surname. Notable people with the surname include:

- Aviv Avraham (born 1996), Israeli footballer
- Ronen Avraham, American law professor
- Ruhama Avraham (born 1964), Israeli politician, former Minister of Tourism and Minister without Portfolio
- Sarah Avraham (born 1993/94), Indian-born Israeli kickboxing world champion

== See also ==
- Abraham (surname)
