= André Santos =

Brazilian footballer (born 1983)

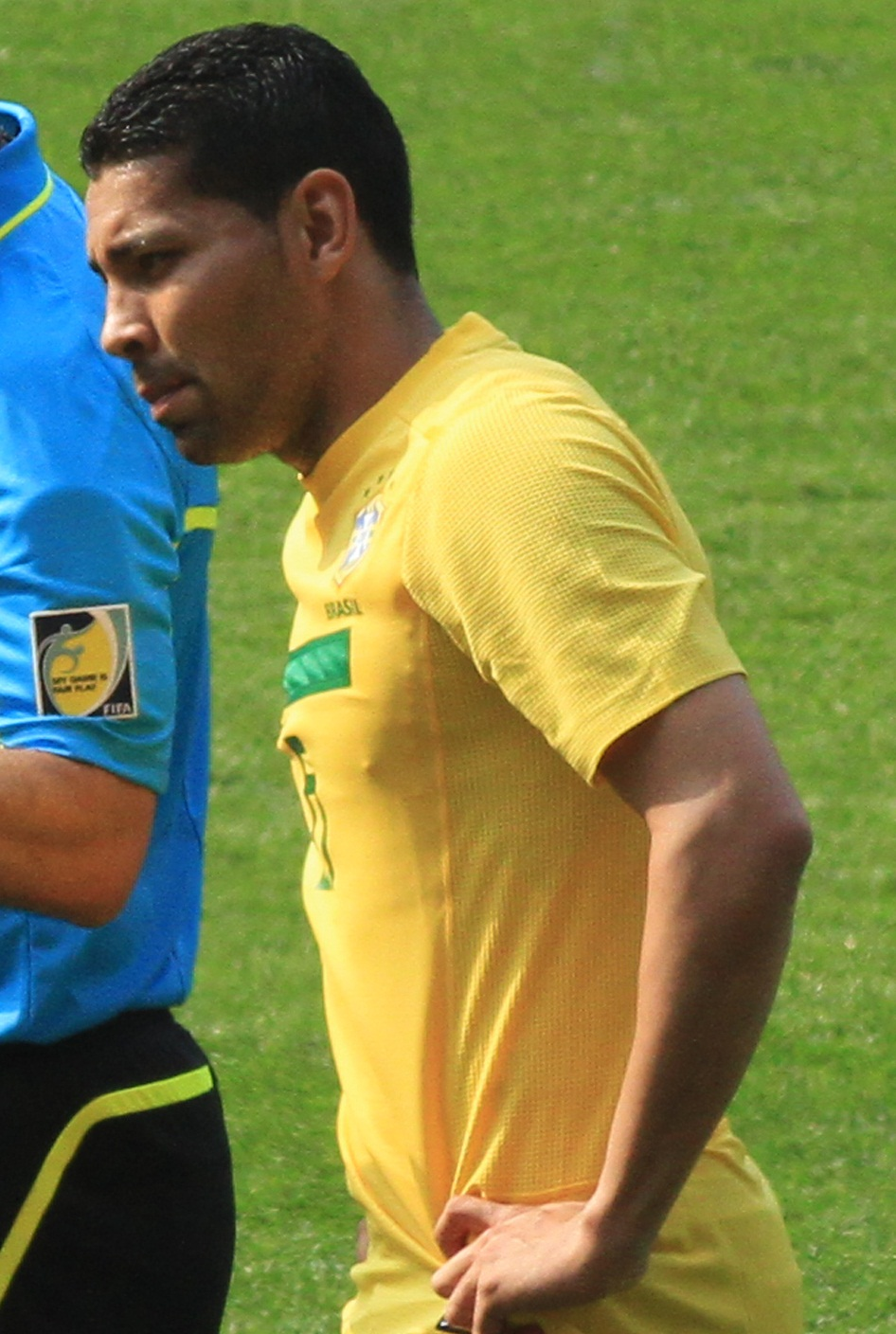
- Santos with Brazil in 2011

Personal information
- Full name: André Clarindo dos Santos
- Date of birth: 8 March 1983 (age 43)
- Place of birth: São Paulo, Brazil
- Height: 1.80 m (5 ft 11 in)
- Positions: Left-back; attacking midfielder; left winger

Youth career
- Figueirense

Senior career*
Years	Team	Apps	(Gls)
2004–2007	Figueirense	61	(8)
2005–2006	→ Flamengo (loan)	22	(0)
2006	→ Atlético Mineiro (loan)	15	(0)
2008–2009	Corinthians	39	(9)
2009–2011	Fenerbahçe	55	(10)
2011–2013	Arsenal	23	(2)
2013	→ Grêmio (loan)	5	(1)
2013–2014	Flamengo	28	(2)
2014	FC Goa	12	(4)
2015	Botafogo (SP)	7	(1)
2015–2016	FC Wil	25	(9)
2016–2018	Boluspor	38	(14)
2018	Figueirense	7	(0)
2024	FC Sokol Seltso	1	(0)
Total		338	(60)

International career
2009–2013	Brazil	24	(0)
Medal record
Men's Football
Representing Brazil
FIFA Confederations Cup
Winner	2009 South Africa
- * Club domestic league appearances and goals

André Clarindo dos Santos (born 8 March 1983) is a Brazilian former professional footballer who played as a left-back. He was also utilised as an attacking midfielder or left winger. On 15 June 2009, he made his first international appearance as a substitute in a match against Egypt. Santos participated and helped Brazil capture the 2009 FIFA Confederations Cup. He joined Arsenal from Fenerbahçe in August 2011.

== Early life and career ==
André Santos spent his early career with Figueirense, Flamengo and Atlético Mineiro.

=== Corinthians ===
In 2008, Santos moved to Corinthians, with Figueirense retaining 50% economic rights for the future transfer fee. The deal was partially financed by DIS Esporte, to which Corinthians later sold 22.5% of the rights. along with Dentinho and Renato, for R$ 5.4 million total fee. Corinthians also sold 40% rights to Turbo Sports, for R$3.6 million and after that partnered with the investor to sign Figueirense's remain 50% rights, making Corinthians own 37.5% of the players' rights after the deal. However, Corinthians did not pay Turbo Sports for its portion of the transfer fee (from Fenerbahçe), after which the company sued Corinthians.

=== Fenerbahçe ===
On 20 July 2009, he joined Turkish club Fenerbahçe together with his teammate in Corinthians, Cristian Oliveira Baroni. They signed a 5-year contract.

He scored a total of 10 goals in 52 league appearances for the football club. He scored 5 goals in 25 appearances in the Turkish Super League in the 2010–11 season, making him the top scoring left back in Turkey. On 29 August 2011, Arsenal agreed a €7m fee for the transfer of Santos.

Santos later said that he was not deserting a sinking ship by leaving Fenerbahçe, insisting he loved playing for them. "I am leaving Fenerbahçe from the front door", Santos told reporters at Istanbul airport on 31 August. "I love the country, Istanbul and Turkish people. I can come back here at the latter stages of my career. I was happy at Fenerbahçe but I did the right thing for my career.

=== Arsenal ===
On 31 August 2011, André Santos signed for Arsenal on a long-term contract, Fenerbahçe SK announced the fee was €7 million.

He made his debut for the Gunners on 13 September, coming on as an 86th-minute substitute for Gervinho in a 1–1 draw away to Borussia Dortmund in the UEFA Champions League. On 28 September, he scored his first goal for Arsenal in the 2–1 win over Olympiacos in the UEFA Champions League.

Santos made his return on 24 March 2012 in a 3–0 win against Aston Villa coming on as a substitute for Kieran Gibbs in the 68th minute.

On 13 May, he scored the equalising goal against West Bromwich Albion, levelling the score at 2–2. Arsenal went on to win the match 3–2 thanks to a Laurent Koscielny winner.

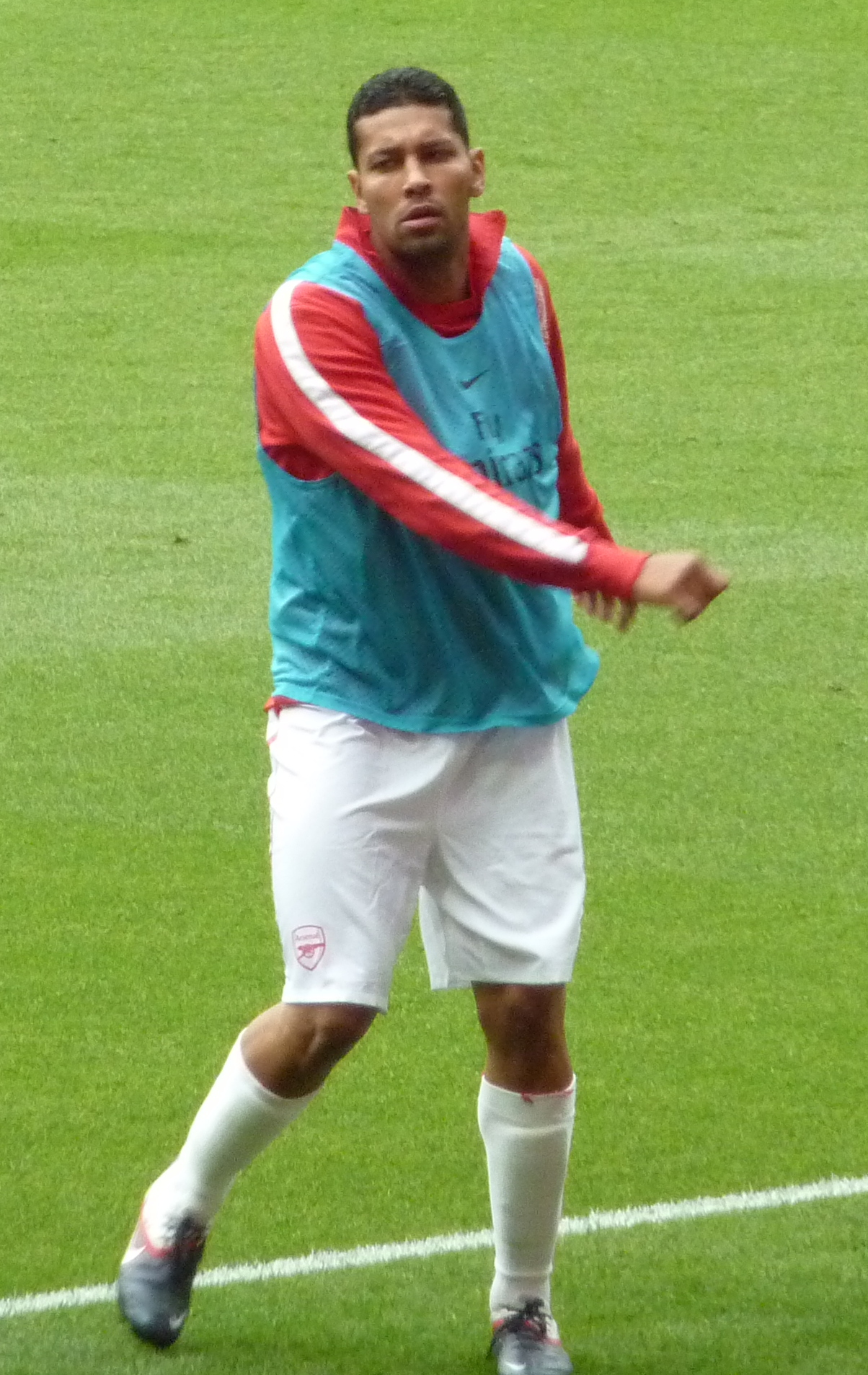
Santos warming up for Arsenal before match versus Swansea City in 2011

On 3 November, after a dismal first-half performance against Manchester United, Santos came under even more criticism after having swapped shirts with ex-Gunner captain Robin van Persie at half-time.

=== Grêmio ===
On 10 February 2013, Santos moved to Porto Alegre after signing a one-year loan deal (with the option for Arsenal to recall him after 6 months) with Grêmio. He was contracted with the club to play in the Libertadores.

=== Flamengo ===
Santos signed for Flamengo on a two-year contract on Thursday 18 July 2013, after his loan spell at Gremio came to an end.

On 20 July 2014, Santos was attacked by a Flamengo fan following his poor performance in their 4–0 loss against Internacional. The loss meant Flamengo had accumulated 7 points in 11 games and the incident left Santos in hospital.

On 15 August 2014, the fullback reached an agreement to leave the club, becoming a free agent.

=== FC Goa ===
On 29 September 2014, Santos joined Indian Super League side FC Goa. Santos had a very successful season with Goa, as he led them to the semi-finals. As Goa's key player, he scored 4 goals and provided 3 assists in the tournament.

=== Botafogo (SP) ===
On 5 February 2015 Santos joined Botafogo Futebol Clube (SP) and signed a contract till the end of the championship.

=== FC Wil ===
After joining Swiss side FC Wil 1900, Santos left the club after one season, he made 25 appearances and scored 9 goals in the Challenge League.

=== Boluspor ===
On 24 June 2016, Santos signed a two-year contract with Turkish club Boluspor.

=== In Russia ===
On 20 July 2024, at the championship of the Bryansk region, he played for free for the Sokol amateur club from the city of Seltso against Avangard from Kletnya. Sokol won 3–0.

== International career ==
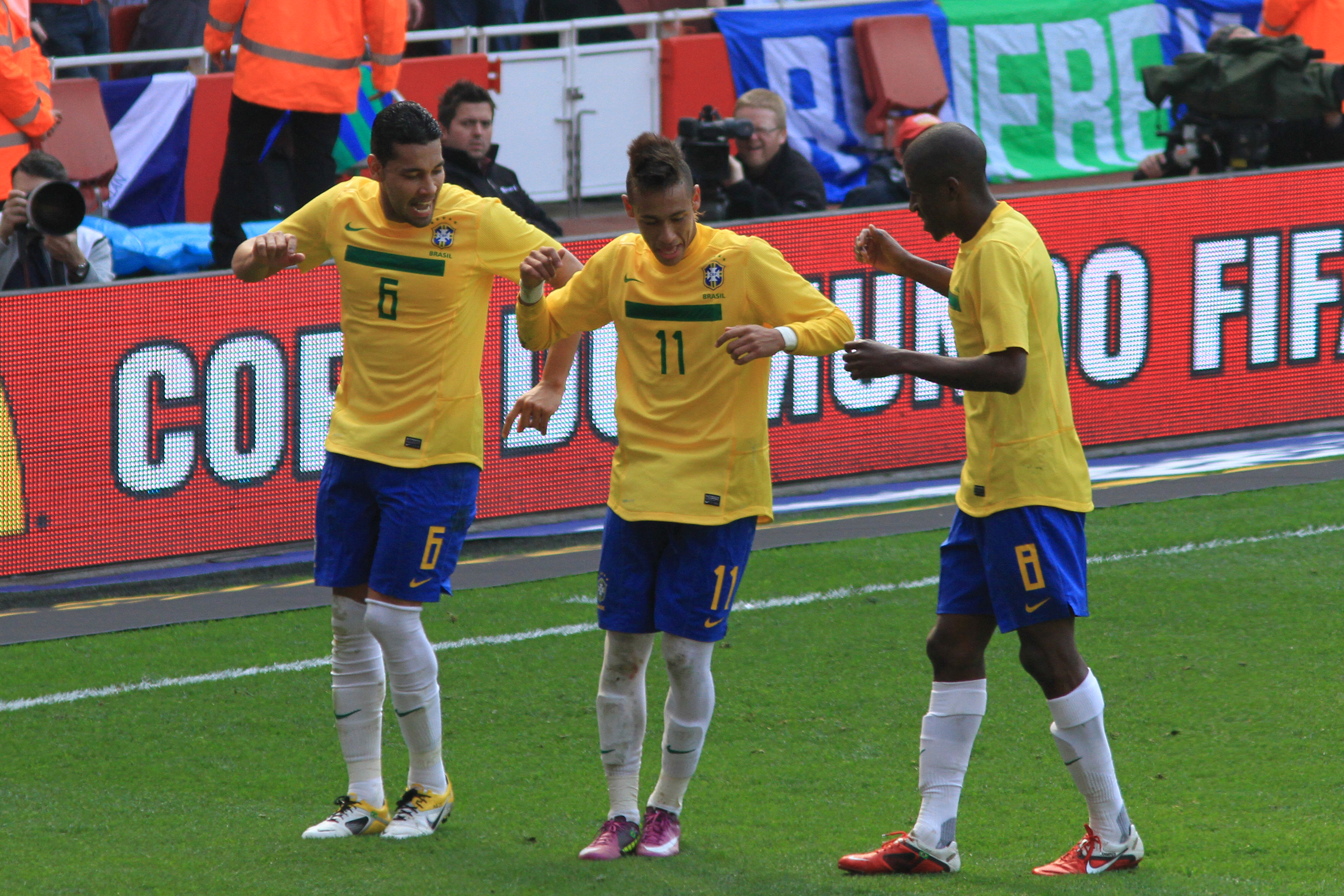
André Santos celebrates a goal for Brazil against Scotland, on 27 March 2011, with Neymar and Ramires.

On 21 May 2009, he was called up for the first time to the Brazil national team for 2010 FIFA World Cup qualification and the 2009 FIFA Confederations Cup in South Africa. On 15 June 2009, he made his first international appearance as a substitute in a match against Egypt. He then started the following four games as Brazil went on to win the competition. He was in the starting line-up in the Final against United States but was substituted in the 66th minute of play for Dani Alves as he earlier picked a yellow card. Brazil went on to win the match 3–2. However, he was dropped for the friendlies afterwards and Dunga preferred Michel Bastos and Gilberto on the match against Republic of Ireland in February 2010. That 22-man squad against Ireland also became the backbone of 2010 FIFA World Cup squad announced on 11 May. After a disappointing World Cup for the national side, Dunga was replaced by Mano Menezes. Under Menezes, Santos regained his spot in the starting line-up.

== Career statistics ==
=== Club ===
As of 30 July 2014 (UTC).

Appearances and goals by club, season and competition
Club	Season	League		Cup		Continental		Other		Total	
Club	Season	Apps	Goals	Apps	Goals	Apps	Goals	Apps	Goals	Apps	Goals
Corinthians	2009	5	0	0	0	0	0	20	3	25	3
Fenerbahçe	2009–10	27	5	0	0	7	2	0	0	34	7
Fenerbahçe	2010–11	25	5	0	0	4	0	0	0	29	5
Fenerbahçe	Total	52	10	0	0	11	2	0	0	63	12
Arsenal	2011–12	15	2	0	0	6	1	0	0	21	3
Arsenal	2012–13	8	0	2	0	2	0	0	0	12	0
Arsenal	Total	23	2	2	0	8	1	0	0	33	3
Grêmio	2013	0	0	0	0	8	1	6	0	6	0
Grêmio	Total	0	0	0	0	0	0	6	0	6	0
Flamengo	2013	20	2	8	1	0	0	0	0	28	3
Flamengo	2014	8	0	0	0	4	1	9	0	21	1
Flamengo	Total	28	2	8	1	4	1	9	0	49	4
Career total		103	14	10	1	23	4	35	3	171	22

== Honours ==
Corinthians

- Copa do Brasil: 2009

Flamengo

- Copa do Brasil: 2013

Fenerbahçe

- Süper Lig: 2010–11
- Süper Kupa: 2009

Brazil

- FIFA Confederations Cup: 2009
