= Abrams =

Abrams may refer to:

== People ==
- Abrams (surname), a list of notable people with the surname

== Places ==
=== United States ===
- Abrams, Wisconsin, a town
- Abrams (community), Wisconsin, an unincorporated community
- Abrams Mountain, Colorado
- Abrams Creek (Tennessee)
- Abrams Creek (Virginia)
- Abrams Run, West Virginia, a stream

=== Elsewhere ===
- Mount Abrams, Graham Land, Antarctica

== Other uses ==
- M1 Abrams, the main battle tank of the United States Army
- Abrams v. United States, 250 U.S. 616 (1919), a U.S. Supreme Court decision regarding free speech during times of war
- Abrams Air Craft Corporation, an American aircraft manufacturer
- Abrams Books, U.S. publishing house
- Abrams Discoveries, a non-fiction book series published by Harry N. Abrams
- The Abrams, a Canadian country music band

== See also ==
- Abrams Planetarium, the planetarium on the campus of Michigan State University
- Abram (disambiguation)
- Abramson (surname)
- Abrahams (surname)
