= Abram (surname) =

List of people with the surname Abram.

- Benjamin Abram (1846–1938), French lawyer and politician
- Darren Abram (born 1967), English rugby league coach
- David Abram (born 1957), American philosopher and ecologist
- Felicity Abram (born 1986), Australian triathlete
- Fletcher Abram (born 1950), American handball player
- Ido Abram (1940–2019), Indonesian academic
- Jacques Abram (1915–1998), American classical pianist
- John Abram (born 1959), Canadian composer
- Johnathan Abram (born 1997), American football player
- Lester Abram (born 1983), American basketball player
- Luis Abram (born 1996), Peruvian football player
- Michael "Mad Mick" Abram (born 1966), attempted to kill George Harrison on December 30, 1999
- Morris B. Abram (1918–2000), American lawyer, civil rights activist, and academic
- Nerilie Abram (born 1977), Australian climate scientist
- Norm Abram (born 1949), American carpenter
- Syd Abram (1906–1988), English rugby player
