= Ryabushinsky Museum of Icons and Paintings =

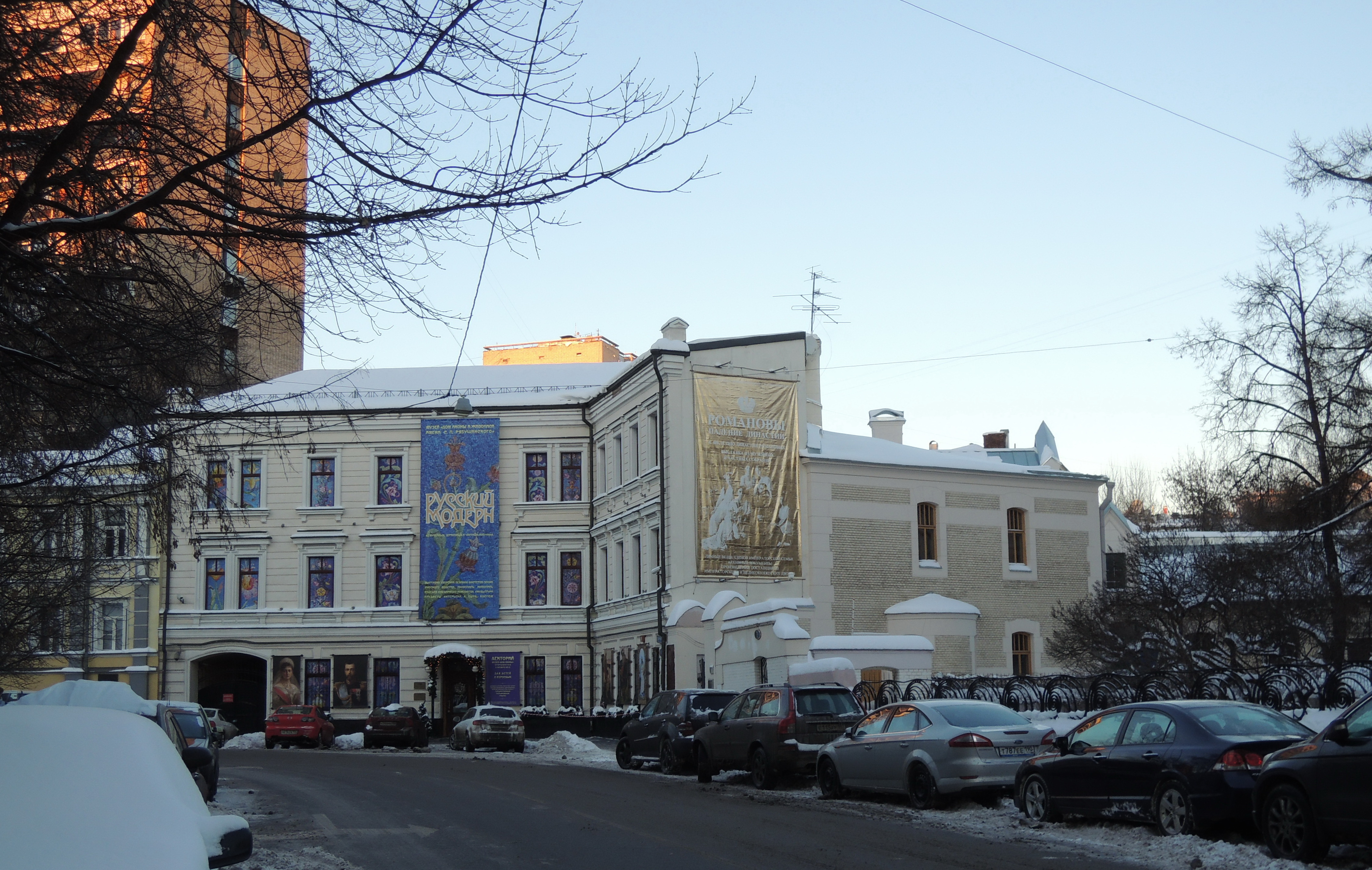

- Location within Moscow
- Established: 2009
- Location: Moscow, Russia
- Coordinates: 55.7587°N 37.5958°E
- Type: Art museum
- Website: rmuseum.org

The Ryabushinsky Museum of Icons and Paintings is a private museum with a collection of more than 2,000 items, comprising Medieval West European paintings and encaustics. Since June 2013, the building was closed for reconstruction, the Museum itself did a cultural, educational and research activities. The Head of Museum is Nadezhda Vladimirovna Gubina.

The museum started from an exhibition in Amersfoort, Netherlands organised by Igor Vozyakov, a Russian entrepreneur and collector, maecenas, who donated to Ukraine an ancient icon "Protection of the Holy Virgin" (16th century). The museum opened in 2009 in Moscow with an exhibition entitled "Godlessness". It showed the early days of Communism and displaying photos of desecrated churches and slashed icons.

== Collection ==
The collection includes portraits by Faum, and icons ranging from the fifteenth through twentieth centuries, covering iconography centers of Russia, Italy, Spain, Flemish Belgium and Flanders masters and cultural heritage pieces.

== Exhibitions ==
The museum hosts thematic exhibitions: about the House of Romanov, about fakes of icon painting, about activities of the Anti-Religious Commission (ARC) in Soviet Russia.

== See also ==
- The Private Museum of Russian Icon
