= Abraham Thomas =

Abraham Thomas may refer to:

- Abraham Thomas (surgeon) (born 1950), Indian plastic surgeon
- Abraham Garrod Thomas (1853–1931), Welsh physician and politician
- Abraham Thomas (mass murderer), United States Army soldier and mass murderer

== See also ==
- Thomas Abraham (disambiguation)
