= Ido Abram =

Indonesian academic

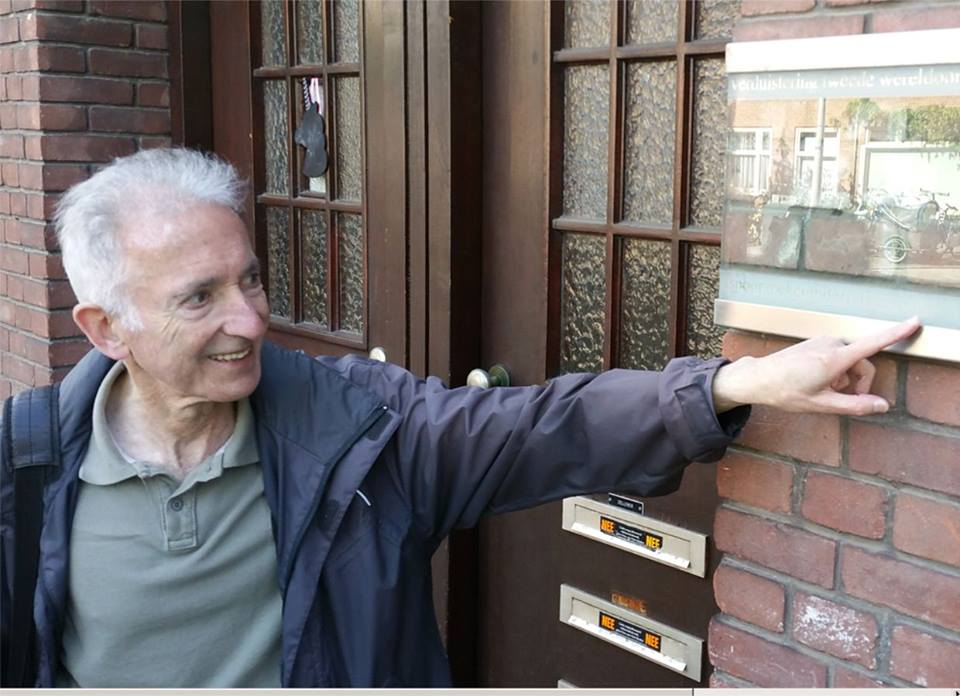

Isidoor Bert Hans "Ido" Abram (1940, Batavia, Dutch East Indies – 14 January 2019), was a Dutch educator and writer on the nature of Jewishness.

== Early life ==
As a small child during World War II Abram was an internee in Japanese camps. After liberation his family returned to the Netherlands. Abram studied mathematics and philosophy at the University of Amsterdam. He was professor of pedagogy (theory of teaching) at that institute and published on topics regarding Jewish culture and identity, multicultural education and "Education after Auschwitz". He had been the first European professor for "Holocaust Education" since 1990.

He developed a model known as the ‘five-slice pie chart’ to illustrate the different ways of being Jewish. He said there are five aspects that in some way affect the life of every Jew. These are "religion and tradition", "the tie with Israel and Zionism", '"war persecution and survival", "personal history" and the "exchange between Jewish and Dutch cultures". Just how heavily these different aspects weigh on each person individually depends on the place and time in which one lives. During the course of a person’s life the various aspects may alter in importance.

== Publications ==
- Abram, I.B.H. (1986). Jewish tradition as permanent education. Translated by Thirlway, Christine E. Den Haag: SVO.
