= Michael Abramoff =

American researcher and businessman

Michael Abràmoff
- Born: March 7, 1963 (age 63); Rotterdam, The Netherlands
- Occupations: University of Iowa Professor of Ophthalmology and Visual Sciences, Professor of Electrical and Computer Engineering (ECE), Professor of Biomedical Engineering (BME)

Michael David Abràmoff (born 1963) is an American neuroscientist, ophthalmologist, vitreoretinal surgeon, computer engineer, and entrepreneur. He is the Watzke Professor of Ophthalmology and Visual Sciences at the Roy J. and Lucille A. Carver College of Medicine at the University of Iowa. Abràmoff was an early advocate for AI in healthcare and in 2010 founded the company IDx, now Digital Diagnostics, in order to develop algorithms that could diagnose diabetic retinopathy at an earlier stage of the disease than clinicians. Through Digital Diagnostics, Abràmoff lead the development of IDx-DR (now LumineticsCore), the first autonomous diagnostic platform to be cleared by the FDA in any field of medicine. He is an inventor on over 60 US and international patents and patent applications primarily related to machine learning, artificial intelligence (AI) and imaging.

== Early life and education ==
Abràmoff was born in Rotterdam, the Netherlands, and received his MD and MS (information theory) from the University of Amsterdam. He did his graduate research in machine learning at the University of Utrecht, earning a Ph.D.

== Career ==
Abràmoff first began working on autonomous AI for diagnosis of retinal diseases in 1997 during his residency at University Hospital of Utrecht. In 2000 he was first author on the paper Low Level Screening of Exudates and Hemorrhages in Background Diabetic Retinopathy, one of the first scientific publications to discuss using AI to diagnose diabetic retinopathy.

That same year, Abràmoff founded the EyeCheck project in Amsterdam, the Netherlands, which uses web-based screening and open source technology to increase access to diabetic retinopathy screening for patients with diabetes. By 2010, more than 30,000 people with diabetes had been screened for diabetic retinopathy. In addition to increasing screening access, the project has supported the development of automated detection technology. One of the early detection algorithms Abràmoff assisted in developing was named EyeCheck.

In 2010, Abràmoff and two colleagues, Meindert Niemeijer and Bram van Ginneken, created the Retinopathy Online Challenge (ROC), an asynchronous, multiyear, online, collection of competitions that focused on "various challenges in automated detection of retinal disease." The EyeCheck algorithm was recused from participating due to the developers involvement in the organization of the contest, but later research found it comparable to the ROC winner.

In October 2017, Abràmoff participated in two congressional briefings organized by The Science Coalition, a nonprofit, nonpartisan organization made up of more than 50 public and private research universities. Participants on the bi-partisan panels shared their research findings and discussed the difficulties of funding for research.

In 2018, Abràmoff was one of more than 50 experts to participate in the first workshop for Restoring Vision: A JDRF Moonshot Initiative. Hosted by JDRF (now Breakthrough T1D), the initiative was created to craft a comprehensive plan to restore the vision of type 1 diabetes patients.

In 2018, Abràmoff testified for the Federal Trade Commission on AI Predictive Analytics Through Real World Applications. In 2019, Abràmoff founded the AI Healthcare Coalition and serves as Executive Secretary, focusing on the policy implications of healthcare AI.

In 2010, Abràmoff founded the company IDx, now Digital Diagnostics, in order to focus on the development of technologies that could diagnose diabetic retinopathy in its earliest stages. Over the next eight years, Digital Diagnostics developed IDx-DR, now LumineticsCore, an AI diagnostic system that is able to diagnose diabetic retinopathy independently. In February 2018, the FDA designated IDx-DR as a breakthrough device, allowing the device to receive expedited review for FDA approval. On April 11, 2018, IDx-DR (LumineticsCore) became the first FDA-cleared autonomous diagnostic platform in any field of medicine. LumineticsCore allows patients with type 1 and type 2 diabetes to be screened for diabetic retinopathy in their regular doctor's appointment, rather than having to be referred to an eye specialist.

Abràmoff is a founding member of the FDA's Collaborative Community on Ophthalmic Imaging (CCOI) and chairs the organizations Foundational Principles of Artificial Intelligence work group. In 2022 the working group authored the paper, "Foundational Considerations for Artificial Intelligence Using Ophthalmic Images," which argued for careful consideration of bioethical concerns alongside the implementation AI systems in healthcare.

Abràmoff has been a proponent of the theory that diabetes complications in the eye and brain are neural, not vascular, in origin, based on his team's earlier finding that microvascular biomarkers of diabetic damage in the retina only occur after neurodegenerative changes.

== Personal life ==
Abràmoff served as an interviewer for Spielberg's Shoah Visual History Project.

== Awards and honours ==
- 2019 Fellow, Institute of Electrical and Electronics Engineers (IEEE)
