= Mount Abraham =

Mount Abraham may refer to:

- Mount Abraham (Maine)
- Mount Abraham (Vermont)

== See also ==
- Abraham Mountain, Alberta, Canada
- Abraham Peak in the Court of the Patriarchs, Utah
