= Henry David Abraham =

American psychiatrist (born 1942)

- Henry David Abraham, 1981
- Born: August 25, 1942 (age 84); Philadelphia, Pennsylvania, U.S.
- Siglum: H D Abraham

Henry David Abraham (born August 25, 1942) is an American physician. He was a Clinical Professor of Psychiatry at Tufts University School of Medicine in Boston, Massachusetts.

== Early life and education ==
Abraham was the grandson of families surviving the Armenian and Jewish genocides detailed in the memoir, After the Genocides: Immigration, Education, and the Prevention of Nuclear War (Cambridge Scholars Publishing). His father and grandfather were tailors. He grew up in Philadelphia and experienced the Great Migration of African-Americans from the South, which instilled a lifelong sympathy towards people of color. He attended Central High School. Abraham completed his undergraduate studies in 1963 at Muhlenberg College in Allentown with honors such as Omicron Delta Kappa, Pennsylvania, where he was valedictorian. As a medical student he attended the March on Washington in 1963 led by Martin Luther King. He received his medical degree in 1967 from Johns Hopkins School of Medicine in Baltimore, Maryland. After completing postgraduate training in pediatrics at Johns Hopkins Hospital in 1968. In 1970 he helped establish with Peter Mott, M.D. the pediatric service of the El Rio Santa Cruz Neighborhood Health Center in Tucson Arizona serving Mexican-American, Native American, and Afro-American children. He completed a residency in psychiatry at Massachusetts General Hospital in 1971–1974.

== Medical career ==
In 1982 Abraham served as consultant to the Institute of Medicine's report Marijuana and Health, as well as to the Diagnostic and Statistical Manual of Mental Disorders, Third Edition, of the American Psychiatric Association (DSM-III-R). His research led to the recognition of hallucinogen persisting perception disorder (HPPD), and its inclusion in the diagnostic lexicon of psychiatry. He joined the faculty at Tufts in 2008. Prior to that, he taught for three years at Brown University School of Medicine in Providence, Rhode Island and was on the faculty for more than 30 years at the Massachusetts General Hospital and the Harvard Medical School in Boston, Massachusetts. Abraham also served as Director of Psychiatric Research at St. Elizabeth's Medical Center in Boston for 12 years and directed the substance abuse program at the Tufts New England Medical Center for three years.

== Anti-nuclear weapons activism ==
Henry David Abraham (center) holding 1985 Nobel Peace Prize with U.S. members of International Physicians for the Prevention of Nuclear War

During the 1980s, Abraham devoted himself to efforts to reign in the nuclear arms race between the United States and the Soviet Union. He played a major role in the revival of Physicians for Social Responsibility (PSR) in 1979, and in the creation of International Physicians for the Prevention of Nuclear War (IPPNW) in 1980. (PSR is the U.S. affiliate of IPPNW.) In recognition of their efforts, IPPNW was awarded the Nobel Peace Prize in 1985. In 2026 he was recognized as a member of the "Boston Brain Trust" of antinuclear activism (https://www.bostonglobe.com/2026/06/23/metro/boston-brain-trust-pope-leo-ai-war/), and one of thirty-six leaders in American medicine (Congressional Record Statement on 04_30_2026.pdf) addressing the fallibility of President Donald Trump's control of nuclear weapons.

== Books ==
In addition to publishing numerous academic papers, Abraham is the author of What's a Parent To Do? Straight Talk on Drugs and Alcohol (New Horizon Press, 2004), The No Nonsense Guide to Drugs and Alcohol, and an editor of Nuclear weapons and Nuclear War ‑a sourcebook for health professionals. Cassel C, McCally M, Abraham HD, Philadelphia, Praeger, 1984.
