= Museum of Russian Icons =

Museum of Russian religious art in Moscow

- Музей русской иконы
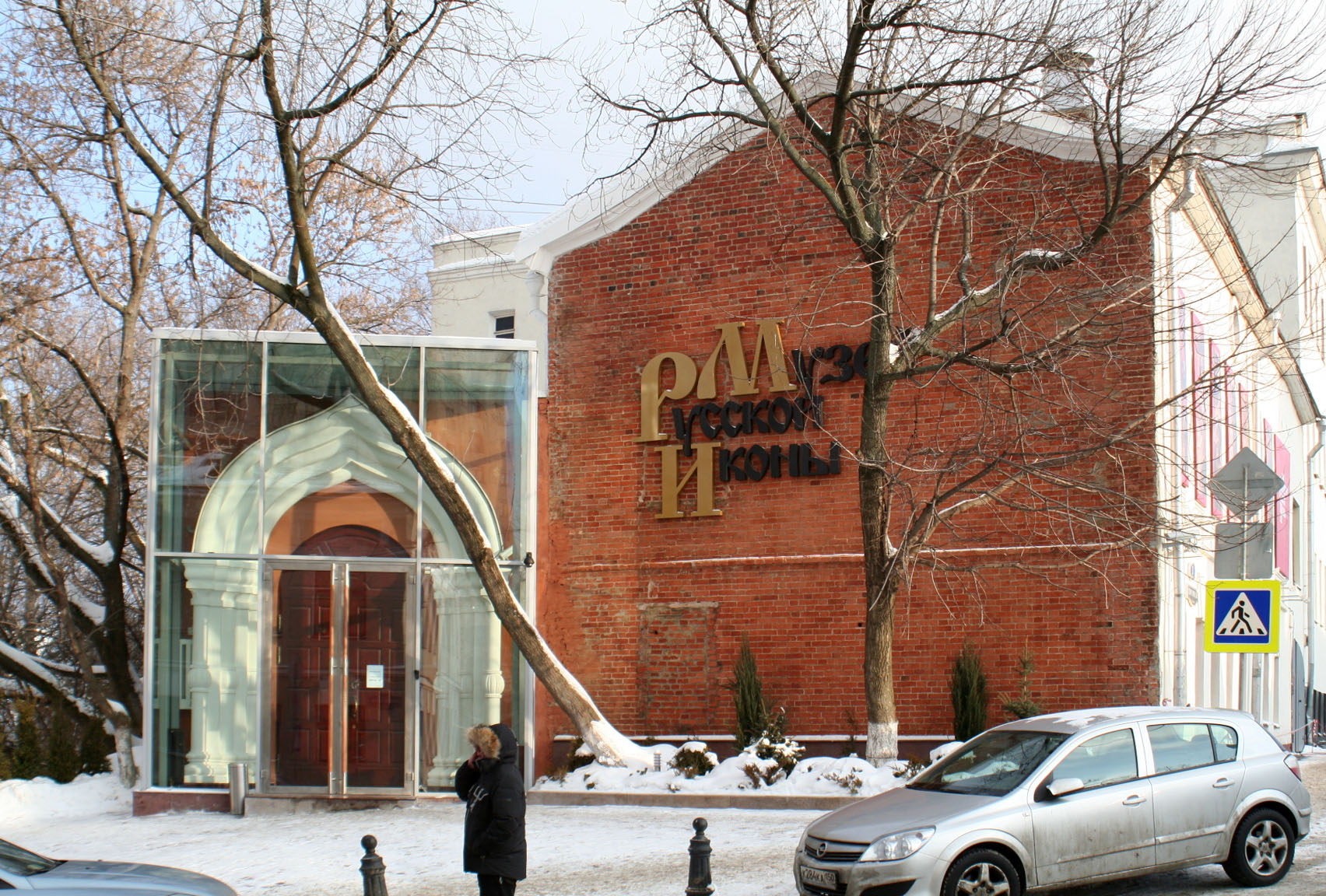

- Location within Moscow
- Established: 2006
- Location: Russia, Moscow, Goncharnaya street,3., bldg.1
- Coordinates: 55.74631°N 37.64556°E
- Type: Art museum
- Director: Nikolay Zadorozhniy
- Public transit access: Taganskaya, Marksistskaya
- Website: russikona.ru

The Museum of Russian Icons (Russian: Музей русской иконы) is the first in Moscow and the second in Russia private collection of the works of the Old Russian art.

== History ==
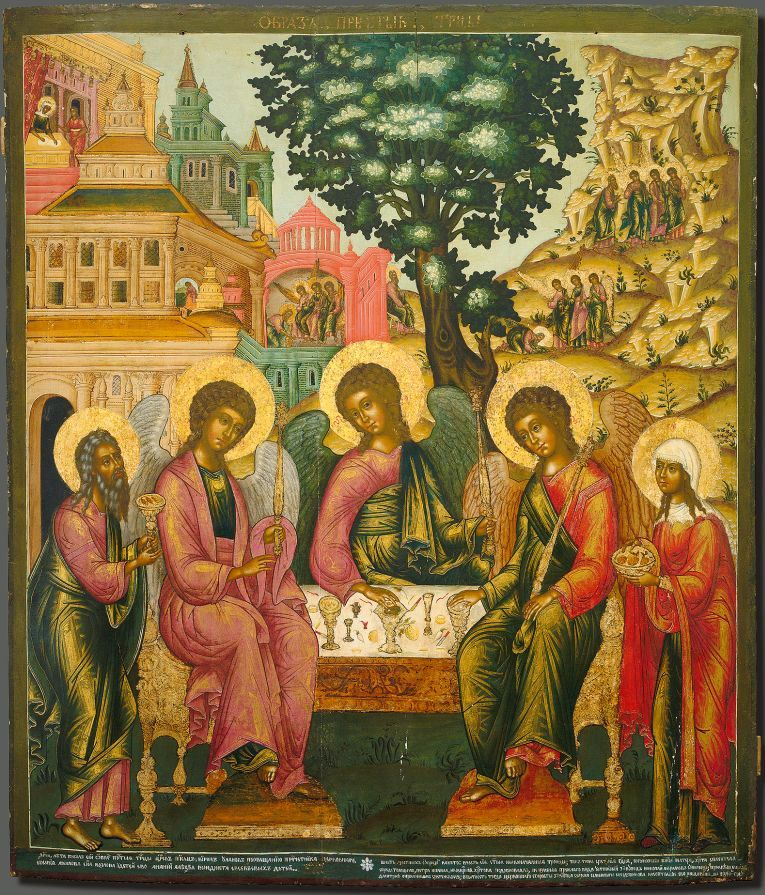
The Trinity by Ulanov

The Museum of Russian Icons was founded by a Rosgosstrakh manager Mikhail Abramov. It started as a private collection of Byzantine and Old Russian art that obtained the official status of public museum and became member of the IСOM (International Council of Museums). The museum's collection totals about 4,000 works including about 600 icons.

The Museum first opened its doors in May 2006 and at that time it occupied a hall in the Vereyskaya Plaza business center. Four years later collection was moved to premises in Goncharnaya street in downtown Moscow.

== Hours and admission ==
The museum is open daily except Wednesday from 11:00 to 19:00. Admission is free.

== Founder ==
Mikhail Yuryevich Abramov began collecting and studying ancient icons in 2003. On May 26, 2006, he opened the "Private Museum of the Russian Icon" and established a charitable foundation with the same name.

As of 2019, the collection has about 5 thousand exhibits (including about 1 thousand works of Russian iconography of the XIV-XX centuries).

This museum is the only private collection of Byzantine and Ancient Russian art in Russia. It has been officially transformed into a public museum, the status of which is confirmed by its inclusion in the international organization ICOM (International Council of Museums) and the Union of Museums of Russia.

Popular exhibitions are

- "The Returned Treasure" (State Tretyakov Gallery, 2008);
- "Masterpieces of Russian Iconography of the XIV-XVI centuries from private collections" (Pushkin State Museum of Fine Arts, 2009).

== See also ==
- Ryabushinsky Museum of Icons and Paintings
- Museum of Russian Icons (Clinton, Massachusetts)
