= Xavier Abraham =

Spanish poet, cultural activist

Xavier Abraham is a Catalan poet, cultural activist and bookseller born in Palma de Mallorca, Spain in 1945. He is the author of three collections: Iceberg (1986), Les mosques, la por (The Flies, the Fear 1991) and Sagitari (Sagittarius, 1998). His poetry includes elements of realism, delicate lyricism and avant-gardism.

Abraham has been the promoter of cultural activities such as the poetry-lecture series Poemes a l’Havanna (1990–93, published as an anthology in 1996), the Traficants de Poesia convention (1996) and the exhibition Art i poesia (Art and poetry, 1996). Abraham was the commissioner for the exhibition Bartomeu Rossello-Porcel, poet (1996) and Dos amics de vint anys: Salvador Espriu i Bartomeu Rossello-Porcel (Two friends of twenty years: Salvador Espriu i Bartomeu Rossello-Porcel, 2002). In collaboration with Pere Rossello Bover, he has published Bartomeu Rossello-Porcel, a la llum (Bartomeu Rossello-Porcel, In the Light, 1999).

In 1994, he opened the bookstore Sagitari (Sagittarius) in Palma de Mallorca, specializing in poetry.
