= Fardon v Attorney-General (Qld) =

Judgement of the High Court of Australia

- Court: High Court of Australia
- Full case name: Fardon v Attorney-General for the State of Queensland
- Decided: 1 October 2004
- Citations: [2004] HCA 46, (2004) 223 CLR 575

Court membership
- Judges sitting: Gleeson CJ, McHugh, Gummow, Kirby, Hayne, Callinan and Heydon JJ

Case opinions
- (6:1) The Dangerous Prisoners (Sexual Offenders) Act 2003 is valid (per Gleeson CJ, McHugh, Gummow, Hayne, Callinan and Heydon JJ)

Fardon v Attorney-General (Qld) was a case decided in the High Court of Australia regarding the separation of powers in Australia.

== Background ==
Queensland passed legislation regarding sex offenders, allowing the Supreme Court of Queensland to continually detain a particular class of prisoner to protect the community. In the event that a prisoner was about to be released, the Attorney-General could request continuing detention. The Act required that the prisoner be serving a sentence of serious sexual offence (involving violence or against children).

Fardon was such a prisoner who was convicted in 1989 of offences of rape, sodomy and assault, and was due to be released in June 2003. The Attorney-General applied for an order on 17 June 2003, which was granted on 27 June, but not finalised until November of that year. Fardon was hence detained after his prison sentence had expired.

Fardon argued the legislation conferred judicial power to the Legislature through amendments passed in "The Dangerous Prisoners (Sexual Offenders) Act 2003" (per Kable).

== Decision ==
A majority (Gleeson CJ, McHugh, Gummow, Hayne, Callinan and Heydon JJ) of the High Court that heard this constitutional argument found the law valid. They held that a higher onus of proof on the Attorney-General was required in this case than the one in Kable i.e. high cogent evidence that the prisoner is a danger to the community. There was nothing in the Queensland Act, which might lead a reasonable person to believe that a resident of Queensland would perceive the court to be a non-partial tribunal. The Act was to protect the community rather than to punish an individual.

The ordering of a detention order was valid within the exercise of judicial power. The court held that courts in general should be vigilant that the continual detention provisions were not extended for arbitrary periods. Gummow J noted that the detention orders were compatible with federal judicial power.

In dissent, Kirby J thought the law was invalid. He looked to the substance of the law rather than intention. It was evidently a punitive law, offending the principles of double jeopardy and retrospective punishment.

== Subsequent developments ==
The Supreme Court of Queensland indicated in September 2006 that Fardon should be released, and later ordered his release, imposing strict conditions for ongoing supervision until 2016. Fardon was due for release on 9 November 2006, but the Queensland Government immediately appealed the decision. The appeal was heard by the Court of Appeal on 10 November 2006 and Fardon remained imprisoned while the court's decision is reserved.

Upon his release, Fardon breached the terms of his supervision order and was arrested in July 2007. He was released again in November 2007. In May 2008, Fardon was once again arrested and returned to prison.

== See also ==
- Australian constitutional law
- Kable v Director of Public Prosecutions (NSW)
