= Abramov, Volgograd Oblast =

Abramov Абрамов
- Khutor
- Location within Volgograd Oblast Location within Russia
- Coordinates: 49°54′N 43°19′E
- Country: Russia
- Region: Volgograd Oblast
- Time zone: [[UTC+3:00]] (CET)

Abramov (Russian: Абрамов) is a rural locality (a khutor) in Mikhaylovka Urban Okrug, Volgograd Oblast, Russia. The population was 278 as of 2010. There are 23 streets.

== Geography ==
The khutor is located on the Bezymyanka River, 28 km south of Mikhaylovka (the district's administrative centre) by road. Bezymyanka is the nearest rural locality.
