= Abram, Łódź Voivodeship =

Abram
- Village
- Location within Poland
- Coordinates: 51°35′52″N 19°38′43″E
- Country: Poland
- Voivodeship: Łódź
- County: Piotrków
- Gmina: Czarnocin
- Postal code: 97-318
- Area code: +48 44
- Car plates: EPI

Abram [abram] is a village in the administrative district of Gmina Czarnocin, within Piotrków County, Łódź Voivodeship, in central Poland.
