= Mikhail Abramov =

Russian businessman (1963–2019)

Mikhail Yuryevich Abramov
- Михаил Юрьевич Абрамов
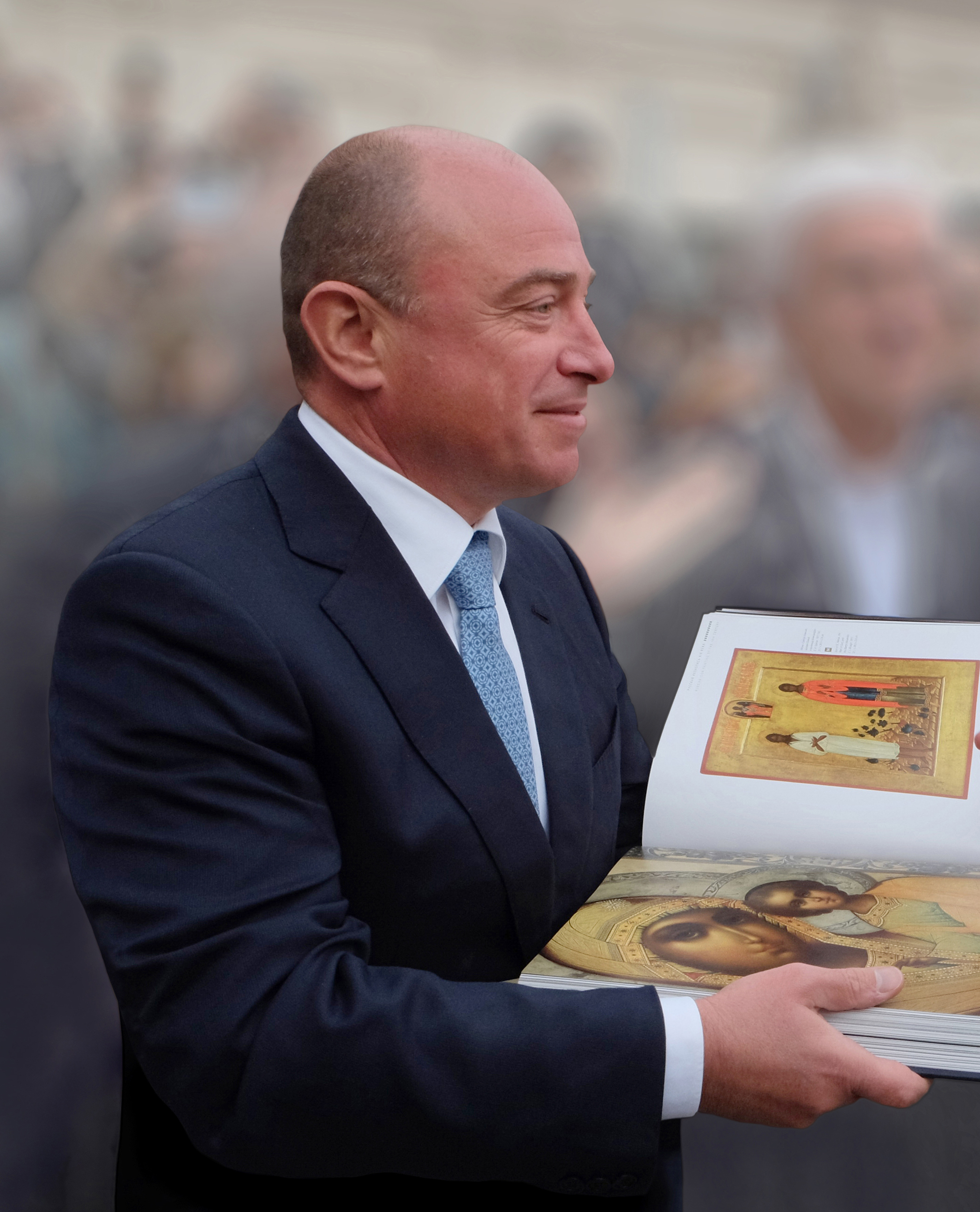
- Mikhail Abramov in 2014
- Born: October 12, 1963; Moscow, Russian SFSR, Soviet Union
- Died: August 20, 2019 (aged 55) near Poros, Greece
- Education: Moscow Institute of Technology of Light Industry
- Occupations: Businessman and entrepreneur, founder and owner of the Museum of Russian Icons

Mikhail Yuryevich Abramov (Russian: Михаил Юрьевич Абрамов) (October 12, 1963 – August 20, 2019) was a Russian businessman and entrepreneur, founder and owner of the Museum of Russian Icons. Honorary member of the Russian Academy of Arts.

== Biography ==
He was born in Moscow into a family of doctors.

In 1981-1982 he studied at the Chemical Technology Faculty of Moscow Institute of Technology of Light Industry.

In 1982-1984 he served in the Soviet Army on the Kola Peninsula. He finished his service with the rank of senior sergeant.

In 1985 Abramov became an entrepreneur. He owned cooperatives for sewing leather and fur products.

In 1991-2000 he headed the construction department at Ingosstrakh.

In 2001 he worked as deputy general director of JSC "Moscow Insurance Company".

In 2006 he founded the public Museum of the Russian Icon from his private collection. According to Forbes, Abramov spent tens of thousands of US dollars a month on the maintenance of the museum.

In 2014 he participated in the preparation of the law «About collecting and private collections in the Russian Federation». In the same year, he was a member of the working group of the Commission of the Ministry of Culture on the acquisition of museum objects.

In 2018 he became an Honorary Member of the Russian Academy of Arts.

Abramov died on August 20, 2019, in a helicopter crash in Greece off the coast of Poros Island. He was buried at the Vagankovo Cemetery in Moscow.

== Entrepreneurial activity ==
In 1995 he founded the company Plaza Development.

Plaza Development is considered one of the largest office owners in Moscow. The volume of offices built is 465 thousand square meters. The company owns ten business centers in Moscow, their approximate cost is 46-56 billion rubles.

== Charity ==
80% of Abramov's income went to charity. He has sponsored projects in the field of culture and cultural heritage, including the construction of temples and the collection of exhibits for museums. He was a member of the boards of trustees of the Vysokopetrovsky male Stavropol Monastery in Moscow, Savvino-Storozhevsky Monastery in Zvenigorod. Also he was a trustee of the church of St. Nicholas in the village of Aksinino (Odintsovo district). In 2015 he donated 700 million rubles for the construction of two churches in Moscow.

Abramov financed the magazine Russian Art.

== Museum of Russian Icons ==
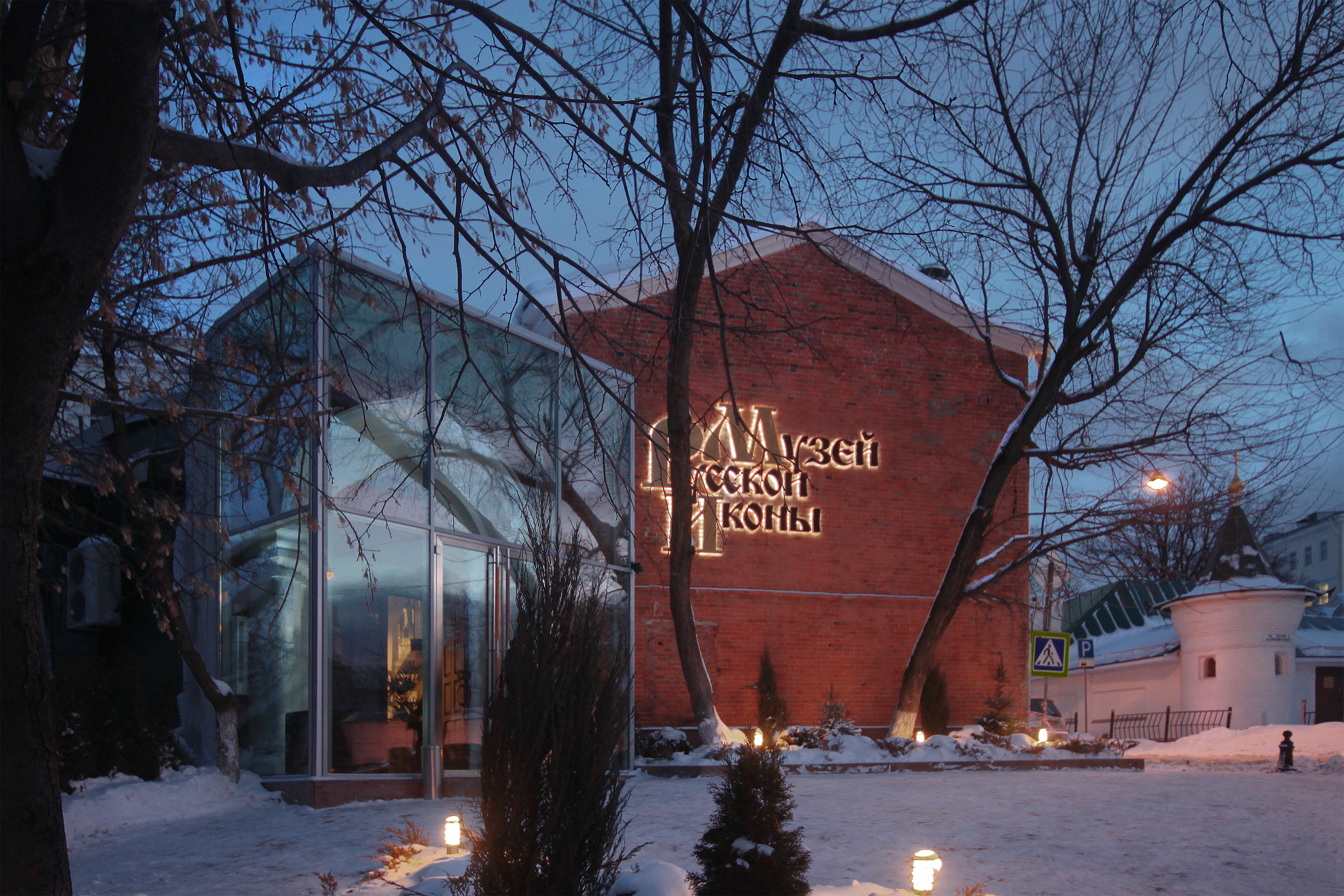
Museum of the Russian icon. Main building. Entrance.

In the 2000s he began collecting icons. On May 26, 2006, Mikhail Abramov opened Russia's first Museum of Russian Icons in the premises of the Vereyskaya Plaza business center. He established a charitable foundation with the same name.

The main building of the museum opened in 2011 on Goncharnaya street in Moscow. The museum houses more than 5,000 exhibits, including about 1,000 icons.

This collection is the only private collection of ancient Russian icon painting in Russia, which has received the official status of a museum.

The museum joined the IСOM (International Council of Museums) under UNESCO. Museum visits, excursions, lectures and concerts are free of charge.

== Awards ==
- 2015 – Order of Glory and Honor, II degree
- 2016 – UNESCO Five Continents Medal (for contribution to the preservation of historical heritage)
- 2017 – Winner of the Russian award "Patron of the Year"
- 2017 – Knight Grand Cross of the Order of Merit pro Merito Melitensi of the Sovereign Military Order of Malta
- 2018 – Honorary member of the Russian Academy of Arts

== Personal life ==
Abramov was married to Svetlana. They have a son and a daughter.
