= Olga Abramova =

Olga Abramova may refer to:

- Olga Abramova (biathlete), Russian–Ukrainian biathlete
- Olga Abramova (politician, born 1953), Belarusian politician
- Olga Abramova (politician, born 1981), Russian politician
