= Kevin Abrams =

Kevin Abrams may refer to:

- Kevin Abrams (American football executive) (born 1971), New York Giants Assistant General Manager
- Kevin Abrams (cornerback) (born 1974), American former NFL cornerback
- Kevin Abrams, co-author of the 1995 pseudohistorical book The Pink Swastika
