= Evan Abraham =

Welsh footballer (1901–1990)

Personal information
- Date of birth: 1901
- Place of birth: Swansea, Wales
- Date of death: November 27, 1990 (aged 88–89)
- Position: Outside left

Senior career*
Years	Team	Apps	(Gls)
1922–1925	Merthyr Town	57	(1)
1926	Walsall	13	(0)
- * Club domestic league appearances and goals

Evan Abraham (1901-November 27, 1990) was a footballer who played in the English Football League for Merthyr Town and Walsall. He was born in Swansea, Wales.
