= Jay Abraham =

American business executive, conference speaker, and author

- Born: Indianapolis, Indiana, U.S.
- Occupation: CEO of the Abraham Group
- Writing career
- Genre: Nonfiction
- Subjects: Business and marketing
- Website: www.abraham.com

Jay Abraham is an American business executive, conference speaker, and author. He is known for developing strategies in the direct response marketing industry in the 1970s. In 2000, Forbes listed him as one of the top five executive coaches in the US. He is the founder and CEO of the Abraham Group, a marketing consulting firm for businesses.

== Career ==
Abraham is the founder and CEO of The Abraham Group, which provides business consulting focusing on direct response marketing. His clientele has spanned from small entrepreneurial organizations to large international corporations. He has authored books that discuss economic strategies in the aftermath of the early 1990s recession and the 2008 recession. Additionally, he is a direct-response copywriter.

== Board memberships ==
- EFactor.com – Board of Advisors (2011–present)

== Published works ==
- Abraham, Jay (2000). Getting Everything You Can Out of All You've Got: 21 Ways You Can Out-Think, Out-Perform, and Out-Earn the Competition, Truman Talley Books, 384 pages. ISBN 978-0312204655
- Abraham, Jay (2009). The Sticking Point Solution: 9 Ways to Move Your Business from Stagnation to Stunning Growth in Tough Economic Times, Vanguard Press, 272 pages. ISBN 978-1593155100
- Abraham Jay, Jason Williford (2021). The Ultimate Real Estate Machine: How Team Leaders Can Build a Prestigious Brand and Have Explosive Growth with More Freedom and Less Risk, 254 pages

== Television and Film ==
- Jay Abraham Documentary (2019). Getting Everything You Can Out of All You've Got: The Jay Abraham Story
