= Richard Abrams =

Richard Abrams may refer to:

- Muhal Richard Abrams (1930–2017), American educator, composer and free jazz musician
- Richard L. Abrams (born 1941), president of the Optical Society of America in 1990
