= Ben Abraham (writer) =

Polish writer

Ben Abraham (born Henryk Nekrycz; December 11, 1924 – October 9, 2015) was a Polish-born writer and historian who became a naturalized Brazilian citizen.

== Early life ==
He was the son of Abraham Nekrycz and Ida Nekrycz, and was born in Łódź, Poland. Abraham survived the ghetto in the city and the concentration camps during the years of German occupation of his country.

== World War II ==
Abraham's parents were murdered in the Auschwitz concentration camp. After Auschwitz, he spent time in three other concentration camps: Braunschweig, Watenstedt, and Ravensbrück. On the night of May 1, 1945, he was released, weighing 28 kg (62 lb) and suffering from tuberculosis in both lungs, scurvy and dysentery. Among Abraham's 200 relatives he and his cousin were the only ones who survived.

== Post-World War II ==
Ben Abraham spent the next two years being transferred between several American hospitals in Germany, eventually achieving a full recovery. According to him "It was a miracle; that time tuberculosis cure did not even exist".

In 1947, after his recovery he clandestinely immigrated to Palestine. There Abraham witnessed another conflict, The War of Independence of the Israel State. He was not admitted to the army due to his health, so he bought an old truck and worked for the Israeli army as a driver.

Abraham arrived in Brazil on January 21, 1955. On April 28, 1956 he married Miriam Dvora Brik, of a Ukrainian Jewish family from Lutsk. In Brazil, he was recruited by Mossad and cooperated with it until mid-90s. He was naturalized as a Brazilian citizen on January 30, 1959.

== Writing career ==
For his work and 15 books related to the Holocaust, Abraham received numerous honors as a journalist, including the Golden Key of Yad Vashem and the Medal of Honor and Merit of University of São Paulo.

== Death ==
Ben Abraham died in São Paulo, just two months before his 91st birthday.
