= Pol Abraham =

French architect

Hippolyte Pierre "Pol" Abraham (11 March 1891 in Nantes, France – 21 January 1966 in Paris) was a French architect.

He graduated in 1920 from the atelier of Jean-Louis Pascal at the École nationale supérieure des Beaux-Arts in Paris, then followed a course in the Ecole du Louvre from 1921 to 1924. He was a member of the Société des Architectes Diplômés par le Gouvernement (SADG) and magazine editor from 1923 to 1924.

After the First World War, he participated in reconstruction work in northern France. Then in 1923, he opened his office in Paris, in association with Paul Sinoir, and produced many public and private buildings in the Île-de-France: His mastery of construction techniques and concrete, in particular, is revealed in his major works.

At the same time, he was involved in the production of villas in Brittany, Val-André and Sables d'Or les Pins, In the 1930s, he collaborated with architect Henry Jacques Le Même on the construction of sanatoriums at Plateau d'Assy, Haute-Savoie, the sanatorium of the Roc Fiz (1932), Guebriant (1932–33), Clairière (1934) and finally the sanatorium of Martel de Janville (1932–1937). Between 1940 and 1942 and 1945 and 1947, he led the experimental reconstruction of the central city of Orléans and was noted for his use of heavy prefabricated reinforced concrete. In 1949 he designed the plan of the École Nationale d'Enseignement Technique de Montluçon (Allier).

== Bibliography ==
- Dictionary of Art Historians
