= Abram Harris =

Abram Harris may refer to:

- Abram Lincoln Harris (1899–1963), American economist, academic, anthropologist and social critic of blacks in the United States
- Abram W. Harris (1858–1935), president of Northwestern University, and president of the University of Maine
