= Johannes Abromeit =

German botanist (1857–1946)

- Born: 17 February 1857; Paschleitschen, Province of Prussia
- Died: 19 January 1946 (aged 88); Jena, Germany
- Education: Albertus-Universität Königsberg
- Scientific career
- Fields: Botany
- Workplaces: Königsberg Botanical Institute, Albertus-Universität Königsberg
- Doctoral advisor: Robert Caspary
- Author abbrev. (botany): Abrom.

Johannes Abromeit (17 February 1857 – 19 January 1946) was a German botanist and teacher.

He was born in the village of Paschleitschen (now Nemansky District) near Ragnit in the Province of Prussia, and he studied natural sciences, German literature, and philosophy at Albertus-Universität Königsberg between 1879 and 1884. During his life, Abromeit served as an assistant at the botanical institute in Königsberg, as a lecturer, and as an associate professor of botany at Albertus-Universität Königsberg. He was heavily involved in the Preussische Botanische Verein throughout his professional life. Carl Christian Mez named the genus Abromeitia from the family Myrsinaceae in his honor. In 1946, he fled to Jena and died in there.

== Selected works ==
- Ueber die Anatomie des Eichenholzes (1884)
- Berichtigung des Sanio'schen Aufsatzes über die Zahlenverhältnisse der Flora Preussens (1884)
- Botanische Ergebnisse der von der Gesellschaft für Erdkunde zu Berlin unter Leitung Dr. v. Drygalski's ausgesandten Grönlandsexpedition nach Dr. Vanhöffen's Sammlungen bearbeitet (1899)
- Schutz der botanischen Naturdenkmäler in Ostpreußen (1907)
- Kurzer Überblick über die Vegetationsverhältnisse von Ostpreussen (1910)
