= Abraham Lincoln (disambiguation) =

Abraham Lincoln (1809–1865) was the 16th president of the United States from 1861 to 1865.

Abraham Lincoln may also refer to:

== Film and theatre ==
- Abraham Lincoln (play), a 1918 play by John Drinkwater
- Abraham Lincoln (1924 film short), a film by J. Searle Dawley
- Abraham Lincoln (1924 film), an American feature film
- Abraham Lincoln (1930 film), a biographical film by D. W. Griffith
- Abraham & Lincoln, a 2007 Indian film
- Lincoln (film), a 2012 biographical film by Steven Spielberg
- Abraham Lincoln: Vampire Hunter, a 2012 American action film
- Abraham Lincoln (miniseries), a 2022 History Channel series in three episodes, produced by Doris Kearns Goodwin

== Literature ==
- Abraham Lincoln (Parin d'Aulaire book), a 1939 book
- Abraham Lincoln (Morse books), an 1893 biography by John T. Morse

== Works of art ==
- Abraham Lincoln (Healy), an 1869 painting by George Peter Alexander Healy
- Abraham Lincoln (Bittinger), a 2004 painting by Ned Bittinger
- List of statues of Abraham Lincoln
- Abraham Lincoln (relief by Schwarz), a commemorative plaque created by Rudolph Schwarz

== People ==
- Abraham Lincoln (captain) (1744–1786), grandfather of President Lincoln
- Abe Lincoln (musician) (1907–2000), American Dixieland jazz trombonist
- SM Abraham Lincoln (born 1966), Bangladeshi human rights activist

== Other uses ==
- Abraham Lincoln (train), a passenger train operated by the Baltimore and Ohio Railroad from 1935 into the 1960s
- Abraham Lincoln (Pullman car), a train car
- Abraham Lincoln, a 1927 Baltimore and Ohio P-7 class steam locomotive
- USS Abraham Lincoln (CVN-72), a 1988 aircraft carrier
- USS Abraham Lincoln (SSBN-602), a 1960 submarine
- "Abraham Lincoln", a song by Clutch from the 2009 album Strange Cousins from the West
- "Abraham Lincoln", a song from the Disney Channel TV series The Ghost and Molly McGee
- Abraham Lincoln, Cuba, a settlement in Cuba

== See also ==
- Abraham Lincoln High School (disambiguation)
- Cultural depictions of Abraham Lincoln
- List of memorials to Abraham Lincoln
- Abe (given name)
- Abraham (given name)
- Lincoln (name)
