= Halina Abramczyk =

Polish physicist and chemist

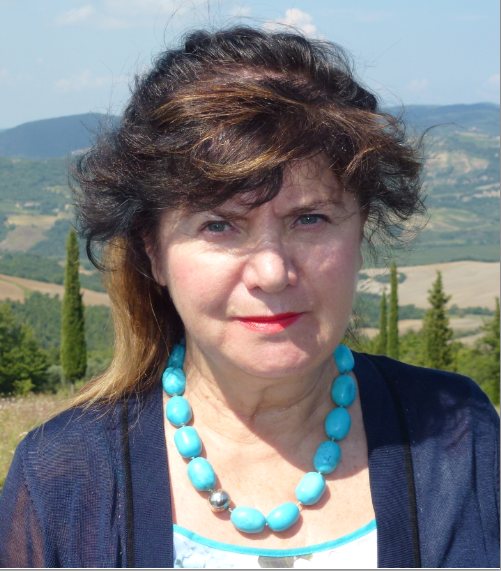
- Born: 23 August 1951 (age 75); Zduńska Wola, Poland
- Citizenship: Poland
- Education: University of Łódź
- Scientific career
- Fields: molecular spectroscopy and laser spectroscopy
- Workplaces: Lodz University of Technology

Halina Abramczyk (23 August 1951 in Zduńska Wola (Karsznice)) is a Polish physicist and chemist, a specialist in molecular spectroscopy and laser spectroscopy professor employed at the Lodz University of Technology.

She is the daughter of Edward Chachuła (1917–1985) and Salomea Kryszak (1923–1989). She studied in 1969–1974 at the University of Łódź, where she earned a master's degree in physics and received a doctorate in 1982 at the Lodz University of Technology for work "Molecular Dynamics in two-component solutions containing benzene "(supervisor prof. Władyslaw Reimschüssel). After obtaining her doctorate in chemistry she continued scientific research in the Institute of Applied Radiation Chemistry of Technical University of Lodz, headed by prof. Jerzy Kroh. In 1985–1986 she worked as a postdoc at Bielefeld University, Germany (prof. Th. Dorfmüller). In 1989, she received her Habilitation at the Lodz University of Technology for her work "Mechanisms of vibrational relaxation in the H-bonded complexes and in conformationally mobile molecules in liquid solutions."

Assistant Professor Lodz University of Technology since 1982, professor of Lodz University of Technology since 1994, extraordinary Professor since 1999, full (ordinary) professor since 2004. Founder and director of Laboratory of Laser Molecular Spectroscopy since 1992, professor and head of the Marie Curie Chair in Berlin at the Max Born Institute in 2007–2009, organizer of the European Virtual University on Lasers. She conducts research on diagnostic methods to detect early cancerous changes by Raman microscopy, Raman molecular imaging and femtosecond laser spectroscopy.

Visiting professor at the Consejo Superior de Investigaciones Cientificas, Madrid, Spain (1989), Martin Luther University of Halle-Wittenberg, Germany (1992), the University of Arizona, Tucson, USA (2002–2003), Max Born Institute, Berlin, Germany (2007–2009), the University of Nairobi, Kenya (2009–2010). She is a member of the Editorial Board of the Journal of Molecular Liquids since 1992. She is a board member of the European Molecular Liquids Group since 1992. Member of the Scientific Committees of many international conferences. She gave many plenary and invited lectures in Poland and abroad. She received a Fulbright Award and is a President of the Polish Fulbright Alumni Association since 2013. She is the author or co-author of many papers in the field of molecular spectroscopy, laser spectroscopy and biomedical diagnostics . She is an author of the book Introduction to Laser Spectroscopy (Elsevier, 2005) and 'Wstęp do spektroskopii laserowej' (PWN, 2000).

She is an author of the book Does Africa sing a song about me? (Polygraph, 2014). Her husband, Andrew Abramczyk, is a chemical engineer; son Victor (b. 1978) after studying economics (finance and banking) at SGH (Warsaw School of Economics) settled in Warsaw.

== Selected scientific books ==
- (2017) Phthalocyanines: From Dyes to Photosensitizers in Diagnostics and Treatment of Cancer. Spectroscopy and Raman Imaging Studies of Phthalocyanines in Human Breast Tissues
- (2017) Spektroskopia i obrazowanie Ramana, rozdział w książce Laryngologia Onkologiczna
- (2015) Antitumor Activity of Dietary Carotenoids, and Prospects for Applications in Therapy: Carotenoids and Cancer by Raman Imaging Carotenoids
- (2005) Introduction to the laser spectroscopy
- (2000) Wstęp do spektroskopii laserowej
- (2005) Laser technologies in medical diagnostics, material engineering, and telecommunication
- (2004) Photoinduced Redox Processes in Phthalocyanine Derivatives by Resonance Raman Spectroscopy and Time Resolved Techniques
- (2000) Phase transition and vibrational dynamics by Raman spectroscopy
- (2000) Mechanisms of vibrational relaxation and solvent influence on the reaction path by IR and Raman spectroscopies
- (1992) The influence of relaxation processes in matrices on the spectroscopic properties of the solvated electron, chapter in Molecular Liquids: New Perspectives in Physics and Chemistry

== Autobiographical books ==
- Does Africa sing a song about me?
- Podróż przez życie

== Bibliography ==
- Profesorowie Politechniki Łódzkiej
- Zeszyty Historyczne Politechniki Łódzkiej: 50 lat chemii radiacyjnej w Politechnice Łódzkiej
