= Avraham (given name) =

Avraham is a masculine given name, the Hebrew version of Abraham. Notable people with the name include:

- Avraham Adan (1926–2012), Israeli major general
- Avraham Avigdorov (1929–2012), Israeli soldier and recipient of the Hero of Israel award (today the Medal of Valor)
- Avraham Ben-Yitzhak (1883–1950), Israeli Hebrew poet
- Avraham Biran (1909–2008), Israeli Archaeologist
- Avraham Burg (born 1955), Israeli author, politician, and businessman
- Avraham Danzig (1748–1820), a Posek and codifier, author of the works of Jewish law Chayei Adam and Chochmat Adam
- Avraham Deutsch (1889–1953), Israeli politician
- Avraham Eilat (born 1939), Israeli artist, educator, and curator
- Avraham Even-Shoshan (1906–1984), Russian-born Israeli Hebrew linguist and lexicographer, compiler of the Even-Shoshan dictionary
- Avraham Gombiner (c. 1635–1682), rabbi, Talmudist, and religious authority in Poland
- Avraham Granot (1890–1962), Zionist and Israeli politician, a signatory of the Israeli declaration of independence.
- Avraham Grant (born 1955), Israeli football manager.
- Avraham Harman (1914–1992), Israeli diplomat and Hebrew University of Jerusalem president
- Avraham Herzfeld (1891–1973), Zionist activist and Israeli politician
- Avraham Hirschson (1941–2022), Israeli former politician convicted of embezzlement
- Avraham Katz (1931–1986), Israeli politician
- Avraham Katznelson (1888–1956), Russian-born Zionist and politician, a signatory of the Israeli declaration of independence
- Avraham Maimuni (1186–1237), son of Maimonides and his successor as Nagid of the Egyptian Jewish community
- Avraham Menchel (1935–2023), Israeli former footballer
- Avraham Mor (1935–2012), Israeli actor
- Avraham Neguise (born 1958), Israeli politician
- Avraham Nudelman (1910–1985), Israeli footballer
- Avraham Ofek (1935–1990), Israeli sculptor, muralist, painter, and printmaker
- Avraham Ofer (1922–1977), Israeli politician who committed suicide over a corruption scandal
- Avraham Oz (born 1944), Israeli associate professor of Theatre and Hebrew and Comparative literature at the University of Haifa, translator and peace activist
- Avraham Palman (1919–2000), Israeli footballer
- Avraham Poraz (born 1945), Israeli lawyer and former politician
- Avraham Ravitz (1934–2009), Israeli politician
- Avraham Sela, Israeli historian and scholar on the Middle East and international relations
- Avraham Shekhterman (1910–1986), Israeli politician
- Avraham Shapira (1914–2007), Israeli rabbi, head of the Rabbinical court of Jerusalem, member and head of the Supreme Rabbinical Court, and Ashkenazi Chief Rabbi of Israel
- Avraham Yosef Shapira (1921–2000), Israeli politician and businessman
- Avraham Duber Kahana Shapiro (1870–1943), last Chief Rabbi of Lithuania
- Avraham Shlonsky (1900–1973), Israeli poet
- Avraham Shochat (1936–2024), Israeli former politician, twice Minister of Finance
- Avraham Stern (1907–1942), one of the leaders of the Jewish paramilitary organization Irgun and founder of the breakaway paramilitary group Stern Gang
- Avraham Stern (politician) (1935–1997), Israeli politician
- Avraham Tamir (1924–2010), Israeli major general
- Avraham Trahtman (1944–2024), Russian-born Israeli mathematician
- Avraham Tal (born 1976), Israeli singer, musician, and musical producer
- Avraham Yaski (1927–2014), Israeli architect
- Avraham Yoffe (1913–1983), Israeli general during the Six-Day War and politician
- Avraham Yosef, Chief Rabbi of Holon, Israel, and a Sephardi representative on the Chief Rabbinate Council
- Avraham Zilberberg (1915–1980), Israeli politician
