= Thomas Abraham (cricketer) =

English cricketer

Personal information
- Full name: Thomas Smyth Abraham
- Born: 19 June 1838; Exeter, Devon, England
- Died: 14 December 1873 (aged 35); Algiers, Alger, Algeria
- Batting: Unknown
- Bowling: Unknown

Career statistics
Competition	First-class
Matches	1
Runs scored	9
Batting average	4.50
100s/50s	–/–
Top score	9
Balls bowled	88
Wickets	–
Bowling average	–
5 wickets in innings	–
10 wickets in match	–
Best bowling	–
Catches/stumpings	–/–
- Source: Cricinfo, 16 July 2014

Thomas Smyth Abraham (19 June 1838 – 14 December 1873) was an English barrister and first-class cricketer.

== Life ==
Born at Exeter, Devon, he was the son of Richard Thomas Abraham of the city. He matriculated at Exeter College, Oxford in 1856, graduating B.A. in 1861. He was called to the bar at Lincoln's Inn in 1865.

Abraham died at Algiers in French Algeria, on 14 December 1873.

== Cricket ==
Abraham's batting and bowling styles are unknown. He made one appearance in first-class cricket for the Gentlemen of England against Cambridge University in 1870 at Fenner's, Cambridge. He batted twice in the match, scoring 9 runs in the Gentlemen's first-innings, before he was dismissed by Walter Money, while in their second-innings he was dismissed for a duck by the same bowler. He also bowled a total of 22 overs across the match, which ended in a draw, despite the Gentlemen being asked to follow-on.
