= Abram P. Fardon =

American politician and dentist (1837–1913)

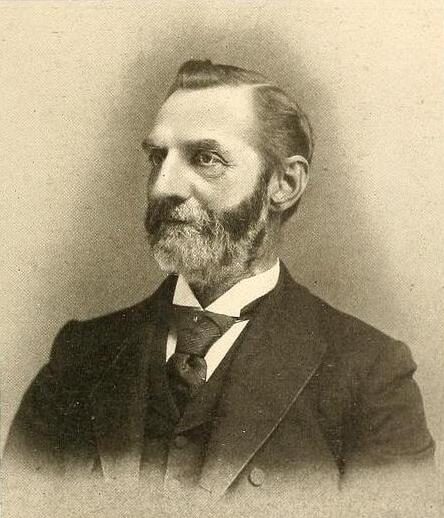
- Born: September 27, 1837; Holmdel Township, New Jersey, U.S.
- Died: June 13, 1913 (aged 75); Washington, D.C., U.S.
- Resting place: Holmdel Cemetery near Freehold Township, New Jersey, U.S.
- Occupations: Politician; dentist
- Political party: Republican

Abram P. Fardon (September 27, 1837 – June 13, 1913) was an American politician and dentist from New Jersey. He was a member of the Council of the District of Columbia and known for his efforts for the beautification of Washington, D.C.

== Early life ==
Abram P. Fardon was born on September 27, 1837, in Holmdel Township, New Jersey, to Eliza (née Ketcham) and Thomas Fardon. His father was an officer in the War of 1812, educator, fruit farmer and church worker. Fardon attended public schools and a classical institution. He taught school and studied dentistry in New Brunswick, New Jersey, and under Dr. Abbott in Brooklyn.

== Career ==
Fardon practiced dentistry in Brooklyn. In 1860, Fardon took an active part in the presidential campaign of Abraham Lincoln. Around 1860, Fardon moved to Freehold Township, New Jersey, and had a dental office there. From 1861 to 1862, he was owner of The Monmouth Inquirer along with William S. Cloke. He also served as the paper's editor. He then sold the paper for US$4,000. He then practiced dentistry again and served on the New Jersey military commission for the organization and examination of volunteers.

Fardon first came to Washington, D.C., in 1864. Afterward, he was appointed by President Lincoln to a position with the Internal Revenue Service. He resigned from the office in 1871. He served as paymaster of D.C. He served as secretary of the D.C. board of education and was later affiliated with D.C.'s board of health In 1865, he represented New Jersey as a marshal at the second inauguration of Abraham Lincoln. He also served as president of the Union Railroad Company.

Fardon was a Republican. In 1869, he became a member of the Council of the District of Columbia, representing the first ward, under D.C. Governor Alexander Robey Shepherd. He championed city beautification projects. He inaugurated a street parking system that devoted more space to sidewalks and dedicated space for parking spots for carriages. In 1870, the law was first enacted on K Street and 14th Street, and it led to the improved grading of roads throughout D.C. He suggested the systematic planting of trees by the city's government. He also introduced the law that prohibited domestic animals roaming free in the city.

Fardon was a charter member of the Humane Society in D.C. and was director for the Associated Charities for a number of years. He was president of the Columbia Real Estate Title Company and the Washington Loan and Trust Company. He was also director of the Columbia Fire Insurance Company and the Board of Trade. He was chairman of the board's committee on public schools and was a delegate and vice president of the National Board of Trade. He was an incorporator and vice president of West End National Bank.

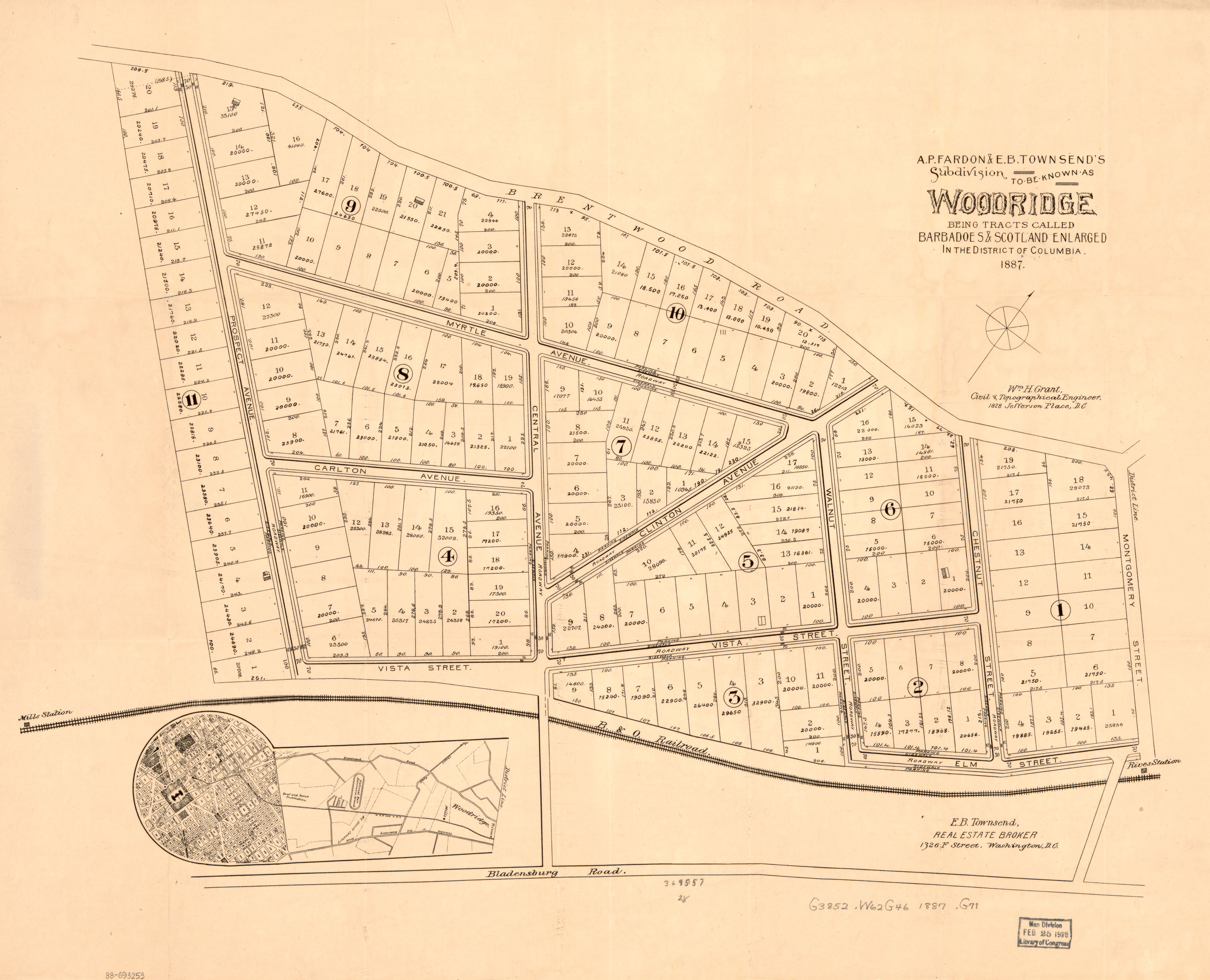
Fardon & Townsend tracts for future neighborhood of Woodridge, Washington, D.C.

In 1867, Fardon began investing in real estate in Washington, D.C., by purchasing several lots in DuPont Circle. In 1871, he, along with nine others, purchased 40 acres (16 ha) north of the city that became part of Washington Heights.

== Personal life ==
Fardon did not marry. He was a member of the Baptist Church. He owned two adjoining fruit farms in Freehold and spent summers there until later in his life.

Fardon died on June 13, 1913, at his home in Washington, D.C. He was buried in Holmdel Cemetery near Freehold.
