= Aleksey Abramov =

Russian footballer

Personal information
- Full name: Aleksey Gennadyevich Abramov
- Date of birth: 15 January 1988 (age 38)
- Place of birth: Severodvinsk, Russian SFSR
- Height: 1.75 m (5 ft 9 in)
- Position: Midfielder

Youth career
- 2003–2005: Shinnik Yaroslavl

Senior career*
Years	Team	Apps	(Gls)
2005–2006	Shinnik Yaroslavl	0	(0)
2007–2008	Dinaburg	28	(2)
2009–2010	Astrakhan	55	(6)
2011–2012	Chernomorets Novorossiysk	37	(1)
2012	Shinnik Yaroslavl	5	(0)
2013	Astrakhan	9	(0)
2013	Zenit Izhevsk	7	(0)
2013–2016	Chernomorets Novorossiysk	76	(1)
- * Club domestic league appearances and goals

Aleksey Gennadyevich Abramov (Russian: Алексей Геннадьевич Абрамов; born 15 January 1988) is a former Russian footballer.

== Playing career ==
2005	FC Shinnik Yaroslavl	Russian Premier League 1st level	*
2006	FC Shinnik Yaroslavl	Russian Premier League 1st level
2007	Dinaburg Daugavpils	Latvian Higher League 1st level	19 / 0
2008	FK Daugava Daugavpils	Latvian Higher League 1st level	9 / 2
2009	FC Astrakhan	Russian Second Division 3rd level	26 / 3
2010	FC Astrakhan	Russian Second Division 3rd level	29 / 3
2011-12	FC Chernomorets Novorossiysk	Russian Football National League 2nd level	37 / 1
2012-13	FC Shinnik Yaroslavl	Russian Football National League 2nd level	6 / 0

* - played games and goals
