= Abrahams =

Abrahams is a surname. Notable people with the surname include:

- Abraham Abrahams (1813–1892), South Australian businessman and art connoisseur
- Annie Abrahams (born 1954), Dutch artist
- Arthur Abrahams (born 1955), Australian race car driver
- Brian Abrahams (born 1947), jazz drummer and vocalist
- Carl Abrahams (1911–2005), Jamaican painter
- Chris Abrahams (born 1961), New Zealand jazz pianist
- Christine Abrahams (1939–1994), Australian art dealer and gallery director
- David Abrahams (disambiguation)
- Debbie Abrahams (born 1960), British politician
- Dorothea Abrahams (1779–1853), West Indian philanthropist
- Elihu Abrahams (1927–2018), American physicist
- Emanuel M. Abrahams (1866–1913), American businessman and politician
- Esther Abrahams (1771–1846), English criminal
- Gerald Abrahams (1907–1980), British chess player and barrister
- Guy Abrahams (born 1953), Panamanian athlete
- Harold Abrahams (1899–1978), British athlete
- Israel Abrahams (1858–1925), British scholar of Judaism
- Jim Abrahams (1944–2024), American movie director and writer
- John Abrahams (born 1952), English First class and List A cricketer
- Jon Abrahams (born 1977), American actor
- Lionel Abrahams (1928–2004), South African novelist
- Lionel Barnett Abrahams (1869–1919), British civil servant and economist
- Louis Barnett Abrahams (1839–1918), head master of the Jews' Free School, London
- Marc Abrahams, American magazine publisher
- Mark Abrahams (photographer) (born 1958), American fashion and portrait photographer
- Mark Abrahams (musician), English guitarist
- Maurice Abrahams (1883–1931), American songwriter
- Mick Abrahams (1943–2025), English guitarist, singer and bandleader
- Owen Abrahams (1933–2006), Australian rules footballer
- Peter Abrahams (1919–2017), South African novelist
- Peter Abrahams (American author) (born 1947), writer of crime thrillers
- Rehane Abrahams (born 1970), South African performance artist
- Roger D. Abrahams (1933–2017), folklorist, author, and academic
- Ruth Abrahams (1931–2000), British artist
- Shafiek Abrahams (born 1968), South African cricketer
- Sidney Abrahams (1885–1957), British athlete and judge of law
- Vikki Abrahams, English-American reproductive immunologist
- Zaraah Abrahams (born 1987), actress

Fictional characters:

- Flint Abrahams, the player character featured in the video game Cabela's Dangerous Hunts 2009
