= Michigan State University Observatory =

Observatory in Michigan, US

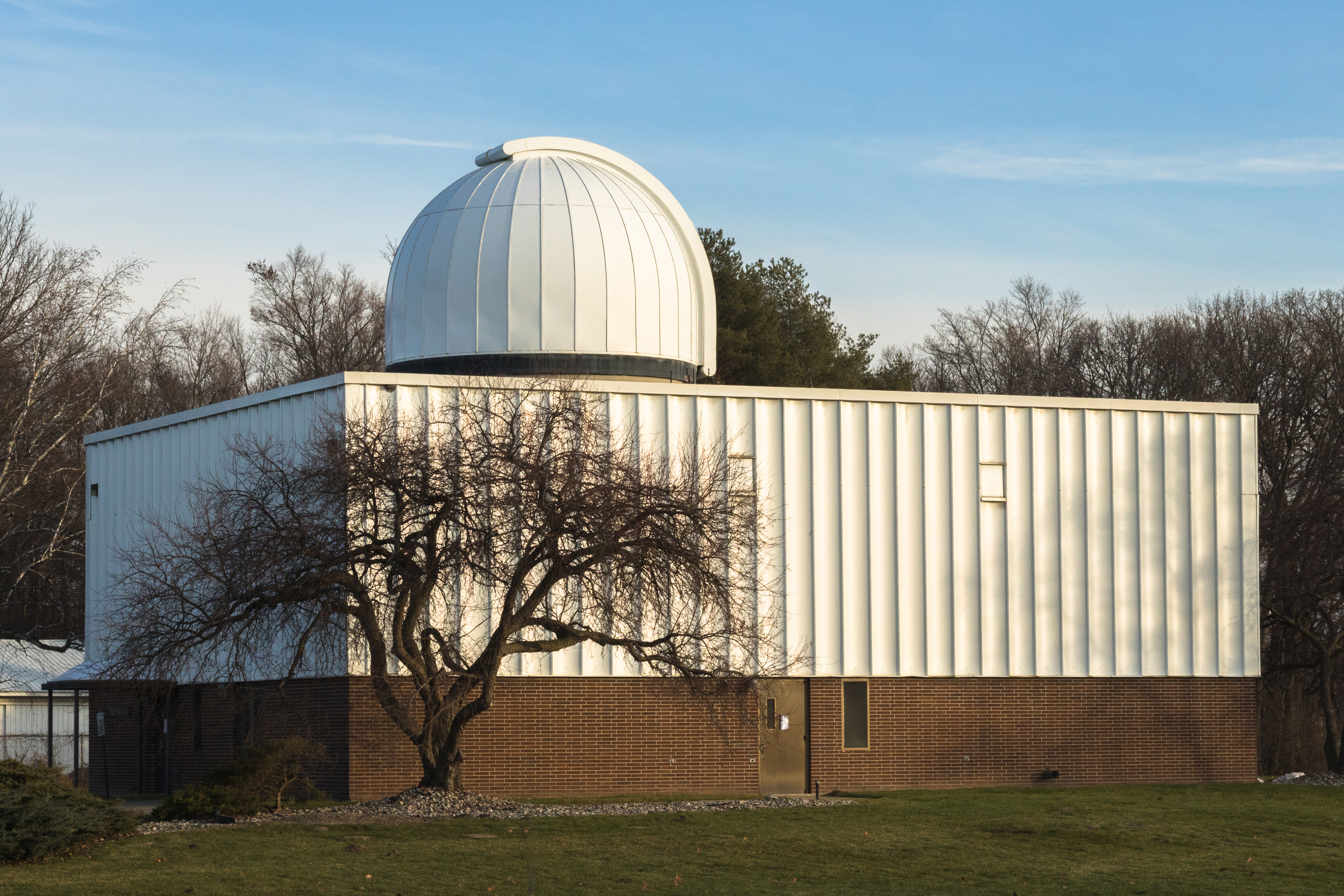
- Michigan State University Observatory
- Organization: Michigan State University
- Observatory code: 766
- Location: East Lansing, Michigan, United States
- Coordinates: 42°42′23″N 84°28′56″W
- Altitude: 264 m (866 ft)
- Website: http://www.pa.msu.edu/astro/observ/

Telescopes
- unnamed: 24-inch Cassegrainian reflector, f/3.0 primary, and f/8.0 focus, with 6-inch refractor guide scope
- Related media on Commons

Michigan State University Observatory is an astronomical observatory owned and operated by Michigan State University. It is located south of the Michigan State University campus in East Lansing, Michigan (USA), near the corner of Forest Rd and College Rd. It has a Cassegrain telescope in its single dome. Built by Boller and Chivens, the Michigan State University telescope was commissioned in 1969 and entered regular operation in 1970. In 1974, what was at the time a state-of-the-art Raytheon Microcomputer was installed to function as a data gathering and control system. Originally, single channel photoelectric photometry and photography using plates or film were the means of acquiring data. The observatory was closed from 1981 until 1986, at a time when the university was having financial difficulties. It was reopened in the spring of 1986 on the occasion of the return of Comet Halley and has been in regular operation ever since. Since the 1980s, a CCD camera has been employed as the main instrument and the Raytheon computer has been retired. The International Astronomical Union has assigned the MSU Observatory identification code 766.

== Prior observatory ==
This present campus observatory is not the first to have been built on the MSU campus. In 1880, Professor Rolla C. Carpenter built an observatory for the (then) State Agricultural College to house an Alvan Clark & Sons refracting telescope of 5.5 inches aperture. The observatory was located behind his residence at Faculty Row No.2, near where Sarah Langdon Williams Hall stands today. The original telescope is on exhibit at the Abrams Planetarium.

== Public viewing ==
Approximately one pair of evenings per month, if the sky is sufficiently clear, the MSU observatory opens its doors for public observing. The MSU 0.6 meter telescope will be set up for viewing on selected astronomical objects throughout the evening. Also, smaller telescopes are set up in the observatory parking lot, with both local area and MSU astronomers on hand to answer questions.

== See also ==
- Abrams Planetarium
- List of observatories
- List of observatory codes
