= Talbert Abrams =

American photographer and aviator

Talbert T. Abrams
- Born: August 17, 1895; Tekonsha, Michigan
- Died: August 25, 1990 (aged 95); Lansing, Michigan
- Occupations: Photographer and aviator

Talbert "Ted" Abrams (August 17, 1895 – August 25, 1990) was an American photographer and aviator known as the "father of aerial photography".

== Early years ==
Born in Tekonsha, Michigan, Abrams learned to fly at the Curtiss Aviation School while working as a mechanic for Curtiss. He was issued Fédération Aéronautique Internationale pilot's license number 282. The certificate was signed by Orville Wright.

He joined the US Marine Corps in 1917 and was assigned to the US Navy flying school at Pensacola. Following World War I, his squadron took photos of rebel activities on Haiti, and Abrams became interested in the potential of aerial photography.

== Career ==
In 1920, he left the military, purchased a war-surplus Curtiss JN-4 and founded a small airline, ABC Airline (Always Be Careful!), but remained more interested in photographic work. On January 17, 1923, he married Leota Pearl Fry. The same year, he purchased a Standard J-1, fitted it with cameras, and founded the Abrams Aerial Survey Corporation (sold to Aerocon in 2003). Over the next few years, he formed the Abrams Instrument Corporation to develop better cameras and instruments for his work, and the Abrams Aircraft Corporation in 1937 to develop specially designed aircraft.

He got his first income from aerial photography when he took a photo of a racetrack from his biplane for a newspaper. Later he used stereo-plotters to make maps for highway design and construction projects. In 1937 he developed a novel form of aircraft called "The Explorer", which was the first aircraft designed exclusively for aerial photography.

During World War II, he founded the Abrams School of Aerial Surveying and Photo Interpretation to teach these skills to the US military, while his Instrument Corporation built reconnaissance cameras for aircraft.

In 1961, he sold the Abrams Instrument Corporation to Curtiss-Wright and went into semi-retirement.

In 1962 Abrams and his wife made a large donation to Michigan State University in order to fund the construction of a planetarium, which was then named in their honor.

He died in a nursing home in Lansing, Michigan on August 26, 1990, at the age of 95.

== Legacy ==
Every year, the American Society for Photogrammetry and Remote Sensing (ASPRS) presents the Talbert Abrams Award to a person who makes an outstanding contribution to aerial photography and mapping. Mount Abrams in the Antarctic is named after him, as is the Abrams Planetarium at Michigan State University.

"For his participation in "Operation Deep Freeze" at the South Pole in the 1960s he became one of the few persons in the world to have a mountain named after him, besides being awarded the Antarctic Service Medal."
