= FLS Sprint =

FLS Sprint 160
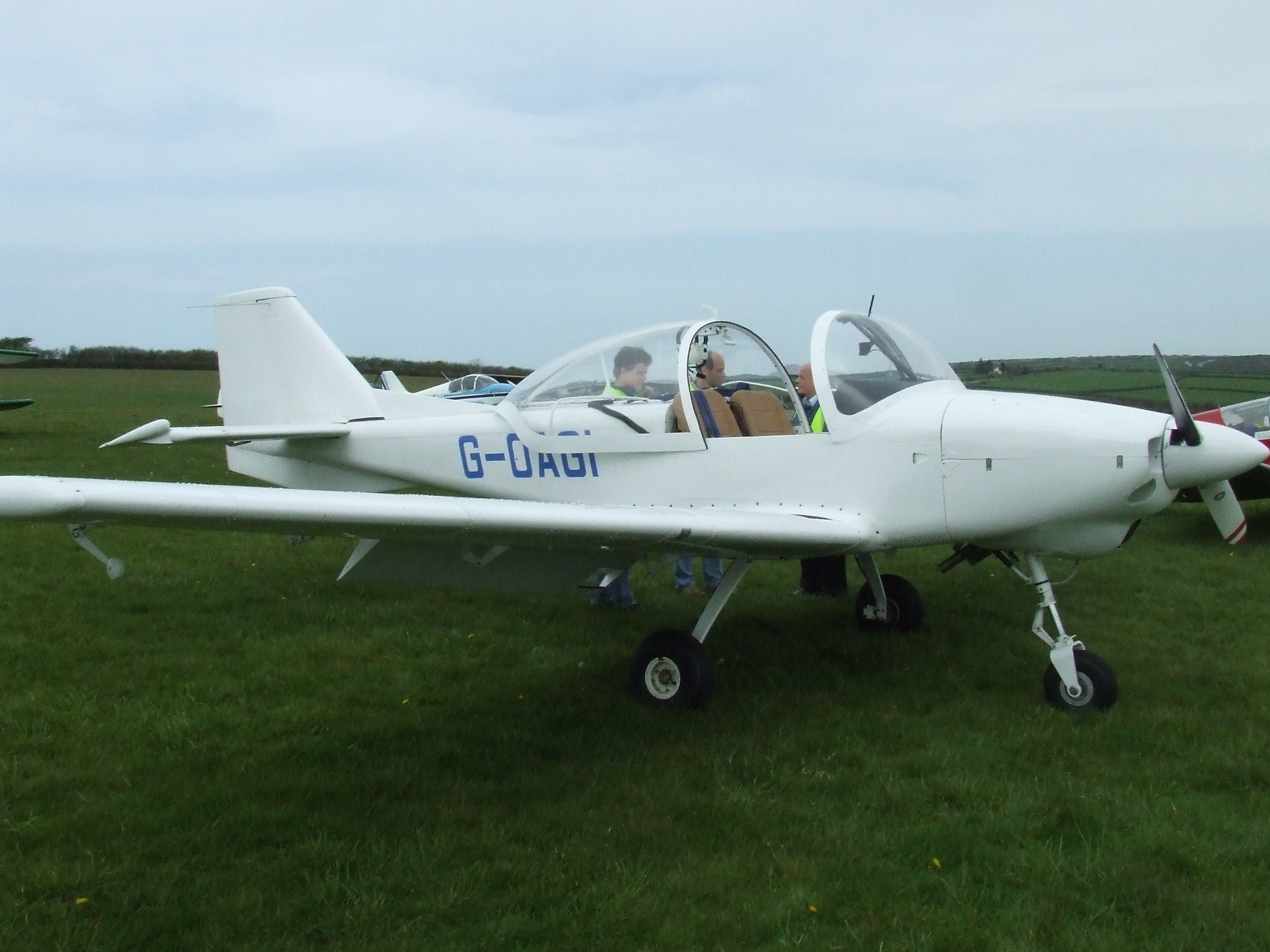
- Sprint 160 G-OAGI, Seen at LAA Flyin at Bodmin Airfield on 3 May 2008

General information
- Type: Sports plane
- Manufacturer: FLS Aerospace
- Designer: Sydney A. Holloway
- Number built: 6

History
- First flight: 23 August 1983

The Sprint is a light aircraft developed in the United Kingdom in the 1980s, originally known as the Trago Mills SAH-1. It was produced by FLS Aerospace in two versions, the Club Sprint, and the Sprint 160. In both versions, it is a low wing, two seat, monoplane designed as an advanced aerobatic trainer with +6/-3 g capability. The aircraft is a fully aerobatic trainer similar to the Grob G 115 or the Slingsby Firefly, although it is of conventional riveted aluminium construction rather than the composite construction of the other two aircraft.

== Development ==
The Sprint was originally designed by Sydney A. Holloway while he was working for the British West country department store chain Trago Mills, which hoped to market the aircraft to Britain's armed forces as a replacement for the ageing Scottish Aviation Bulldog trainer. The original aircraft was designated the SAH-1 in honour of Mr. Holloway. The production and design of the 120 hp SAH-1 (now the FLS Club Sprint) was undertaken at Bodmin Airfield. The prototype first flew with Air Vice-Marshal Geoffrey Cairns at the controls on 23 August 1983. Two years later, on 12 December 1985, the SAH-1 gained its type certificate. In 1987, the plans were sold onto Orca Aircraft, but a slump in the world's economy left Orca Aircraft bankrupt in 1989. The plans for the SAH-1 again changed hands, this time to FLS Aerospace.

FLS Aerospace began modifying the basic SAH-1 and came up with two models, the Club Sprint, essentially the original SAH-1, and the Sprint 160, a re-engined Club Sprint, with a 160 hp aerobatic Lycoming and a Hoffman constant speed prop. FLS got as far as building a first run of five of these aircraft between 1993 and 1998 (of which four are complete and airworthy as of July 2025 – the others are in storage) while negotiating a building contract. However, before the Sprint could be produced FLS went bankrupt and the Sprint programme was put into storage.

In 2006, the design was sold again, this time to The British Light Aircraft Company Ltd. who subsequently had to sell the design (along with the Edgley Optica surveillance aircraft). The two designs were bought in 2007 by John Edgley, the Optica's designer. The Sprint is planned to be manufactured as a kit aircraft for the British Homebuilders' Market.

In 2025 the previously incomplete fifth aircraft, registered as G-BXWV, was completed as a Sprint 160iS. This aircraft is fitted with a new Rotax 916 iS powerplant and is in use as a testbed for aerobatic use of Sustainable Aviation Fuel with the Royal Air Force's Rapid Capabilities Office (RCO). The aircraft was publicly displayed at Royal International Air Tattoo 2025.

== Variants ==
- SAH-1 – Trago Mills prototype with Avco Lycoming O-235-L2A engine (1 complete, registered G-SAHI)
- Club Sprint – FLS production version of SAH-1 (1 complete, registered G-BVNU)
- Sprint 160 – FLS version with Textron Lycoming AEIO-320-D1B engine (2 complete (G-OAGI, G-SCLX), plus one incomplete in storage (G-BXWU))
- Sprint 160iS – CFS Aero modified version with Rotax 916 iS engine (1 complete, registered G-BXWV, from previously incomplete Sprint 160)

== Specifications (Sprint 160) ==
Data from Orca Aircraft SAH-1 Pilot's Operating Handbook
FLS Sprint 160 Pilot's Operating Handbook

General characteristics

- Crew: 2
- Length: 22 ft (6.7 m)
- Wingspan: 30 ft 8 in (9.35 m)
- Height: 7 ft 8 in (2.34 m)
- Empty weight: 1,425 lb (646 kg)
- Gross weight: 1,920 lb (871 kg) (aerobatic)
- Max takeoff weight: 2,050 lb (930 kg)
- Powerplant: 1 × Textron Lycoming AEIO-320-D1B 4-cylinder air-cooled horizontally-opposed piston engine, 160 hp (120 kW)
- Propellers: 2-bladed variable-pitch propeller

Performance

- Maximum speed: 140 kn (160 mph, 260 km/h)
- Cruise speed: 126 kn (145 mph, 233 km/h)
- Stall speed: 50 kn (58 mph, 93 km/h)
- Range: 500 nmi (580 mi, 930 km)
- Service ceiling: 10,000 ft (3,000 m) (Club Sprint)
- Rate of climb: 1,000 ft/min (5.1 m/s)
