= Bickington Steam Railway =

Coordinates: 50.556°N 3.665°W

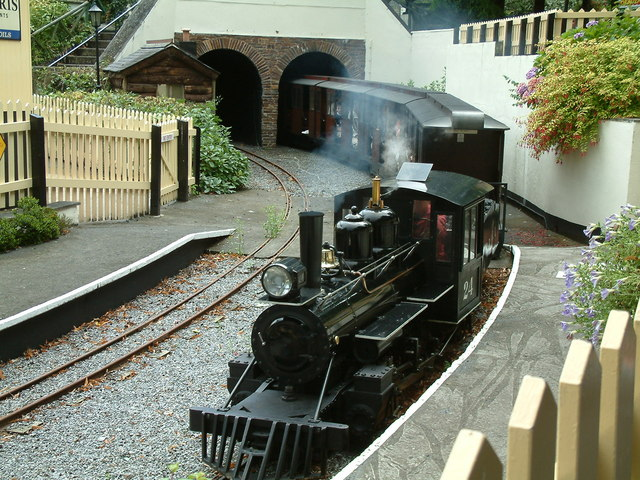
- SR&RL 2-6-2 No. 24 'Sandy River' at Trago Mills Central station.

Overview
- Owner: Trago Mills
- Termini: Trago Central (Fun Park); Riverside Station (Car Park)
- Stations: 3

Service
- Services: Goose Glen Halt (Additional Car Park)
- Operator(s): Trago Mills

History
- Opened: 1988

Technical
- Line length: 2 mi (3.2 km)
- Track length: 2.5 mi (4.0 km)
- Track gauge: 10 1/4 in (260 mm)

Located at Trago Mills Regional Shopping Centre, Newton Abbot, the 10 1/4 in (260 mm) ridable miniature railway Bickington Steam Railway was opened in 1988, using equipment recovered from the Suffolk Wildlife Park, which itself was taken from Rudyard Lake.

== See also ==
- Trago Mills
