= Abraham Abrahams =

English-Australian businessman and connoisseur

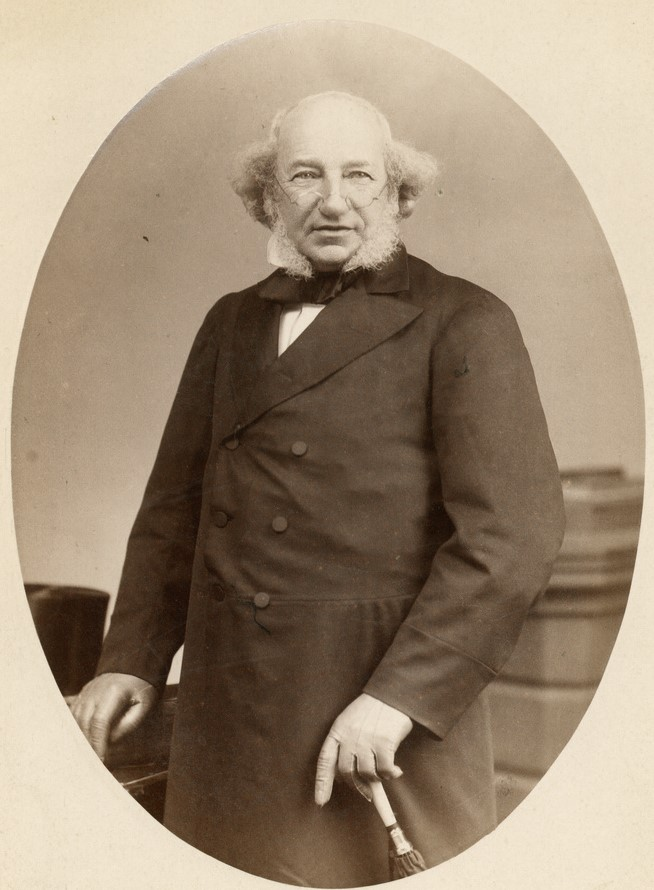
- Born: c. 1813; Sheerness, Kent, England
- Died: 3 April 1892; Melbourne, Victoria, Australia
- Resting place: West Terrace Cemetery, Adelaide, South Australia, Australia

Abraham Abrahams (c. 1813 – 3 April 1892) was an English-Australian painter, businessman, philanthropist, judicial officer, and animal welfare advocate.

== History ==
Abrahams was born in Sheerness, Kent, and was educated in Colchester, England, then went to work for Hyams & Co., clothing retailers of London, and became a commercial traveller for the company. In 1850, he emigrated to South Australia, where he went into business as an importer, in 1859 taking William Thompson (previously with Acraman & Co.) as a partner; dissolving with the death of Thompson on 15 November 1861. In 1864, he accepted positions as secretary to the Imperial Permanent Building Society for a short time, and to the Equitable Fire Insurance Company, which he held until 1891.

In 1880, Abrahams, with Catherine Helen Spence, William Kay and a few others, founded the Executor, Trustee, and Agency Company in South Australia, using Dutch companies in South Africa as a model, and was elected its manager, a post he held until September 1891, when forced to resign by failing eyesight.

He was a prominent philanthropist: he was treasurer of the Assyrian Fund and the Indian Relief Fund. He was on the board of the Home for Incurables, and secretary of the Society for the Prevention of Cruelty to Animals. He was one of the oldest members of the Jewish Synagogue in Adelaide, and at various times served as secretary and treasurer, though not as actively involved in later years. He was a founding member of the South Australian Society of Arts, its first treasurer, and its secretary 1866–1885. He was elected to the gazetted position on the Board of Governors of the Public Library in 1884 and served as chairman 1888–1889. He played a prominent part in the management of the Art Gallery and Zoological Gardens. He was a Justice of the Peace and a prominent Freemason.

== Personal ==
He never married; for twenty years he lived at the York Hotel on Rundle Street. He only left South Australia once: in January 1892, to escape the effects of a hot summer, he made a trip to Hobart, Tasmania, and died in Melbourne on the return voyage. He was buried in the Jewish section of the West Terrace Cemetery, Adelaide.

He was a connoisseur of the paintings of the Old Masters.

== Recognition ==
He was in 1881, in recognition of his service to art, presented with a portrait of himself, painted by J. A. Upton, which is held by the Art Gallery.
