= David Abraham =

David Abraham may refer to:

- David Abraham (historian) (born 1946), American legal scholar and historian
- David Abraham (television executive) (born 1963), British television executive
- David Abraham (footballer) (born 1986), Argentine professional footballer

== See also ==
- David Abraham Cheulkar (1909–1982), Indian film actor
- David Abrahams (disambiguation)
