= Abrams Air Craft =

1937–1940s aircraft manufacturer in the United States

The Abrams Air Craft Corporation was an aircraft manufacturer established in Lansing, Michigan, USA, in 1937 as an offshoot of Talbert Abrams' Aerial Survey Corporation. Abrams had founded an airline (ABC Airline) in 1929 but found himself increasingly interested in aerial photography. The new company was created for the purpose of designing and producing a dedicated survey aircraft. The result was the P-1 Explorer, designed by Abrams with assistance from Kenneth Ronan of Ronan & Kunzl.

World War II interrupted further work.
