= Bodmin Airfield =

- British Ensign of Civil Aviation
- IATA: none; ICAO: EGLA

Summary
- Airport type: Private
- Operator: Cornwall Flying Club Ltd
- Location: Bodmin
- Elevation AMSL: 650 ft / 198 m
- Coordinates: 50°29′59″N 004°39′57″W
- Website: www.bodminairfield.com

Map
- Location in Cornwall

Runways
Direction	Length		Surface
Direction	m	ft	Surface
03/21	480	1,575	Grass
13/31	610	2,001	Grass

Bodmin Airfield (ICAO: EGLA) is located 4 miles (6.4 km) northeast of Bodmin, Cornwall, England, UK.

Radio equipped microlights can use Bodmin (radio contact preferred). All aircraft are strictly on Prior Permission Required basis.

== History ==
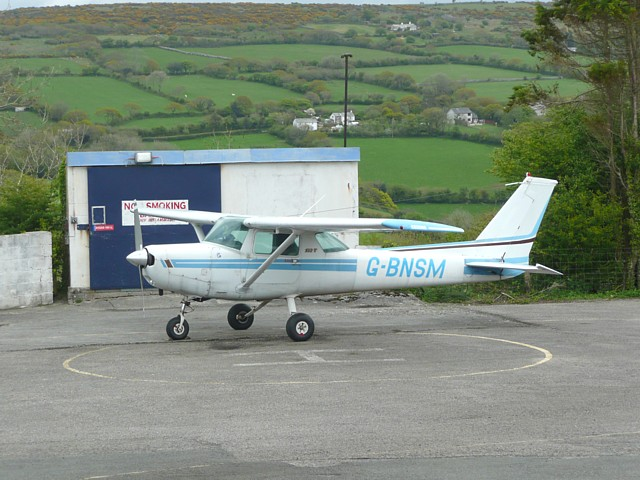

Bodmin Airfield was a dream come true for a local business man, Mike Robertson, founder of Trago Mills. He wanted to make aviation available to everyone. In pursuit of this dream, local engineers, The Dingle Brothers were commissioned to construct the airfield on what was once known as Treswithick Farm. In 1972, the airfield was bought by the Cornwall Flying Club, which, in turn, became a limited company, Cornwall Flying Club Ltd, in 1978. In keeping with the original ideals and dreams of its creator, Cornwall Flying Club operates as a non-profit organisation, to keep costs down for the end user.

Trago Mills Ltd. (Aviation Division) designed and built the Trago Mills SAH-1 in the early 1980s here. The SAH-1 derived its name from its designer, Sydney A. Holloway. It was hoped that the Trago Mills SAH-1 would be bought by the RAF as a military trainer to replace the Scottish Aviation Bulldog fleet.

== About ==
Bodmin airfield is situated on the edge of Bodmin Moor, just off the A30 main road. It is operated by the Cornwall Flying Club (CFC Ltd) and has a clubhouse, a lunchtime bar and a restaurant. CFC Ltd. has five instructors and four aircraft, including two Van's Aircraft RV-12, a Cessna 172 and a Cessna 152. The airfield is also home to Cornwall Aviation Services, an aircraft maintenance business.
