= Abrams Planetarium =

Planetarium on the campus of Michigan State University, Michigan, United States

Coordinates: 42.7256°N 84.476°W

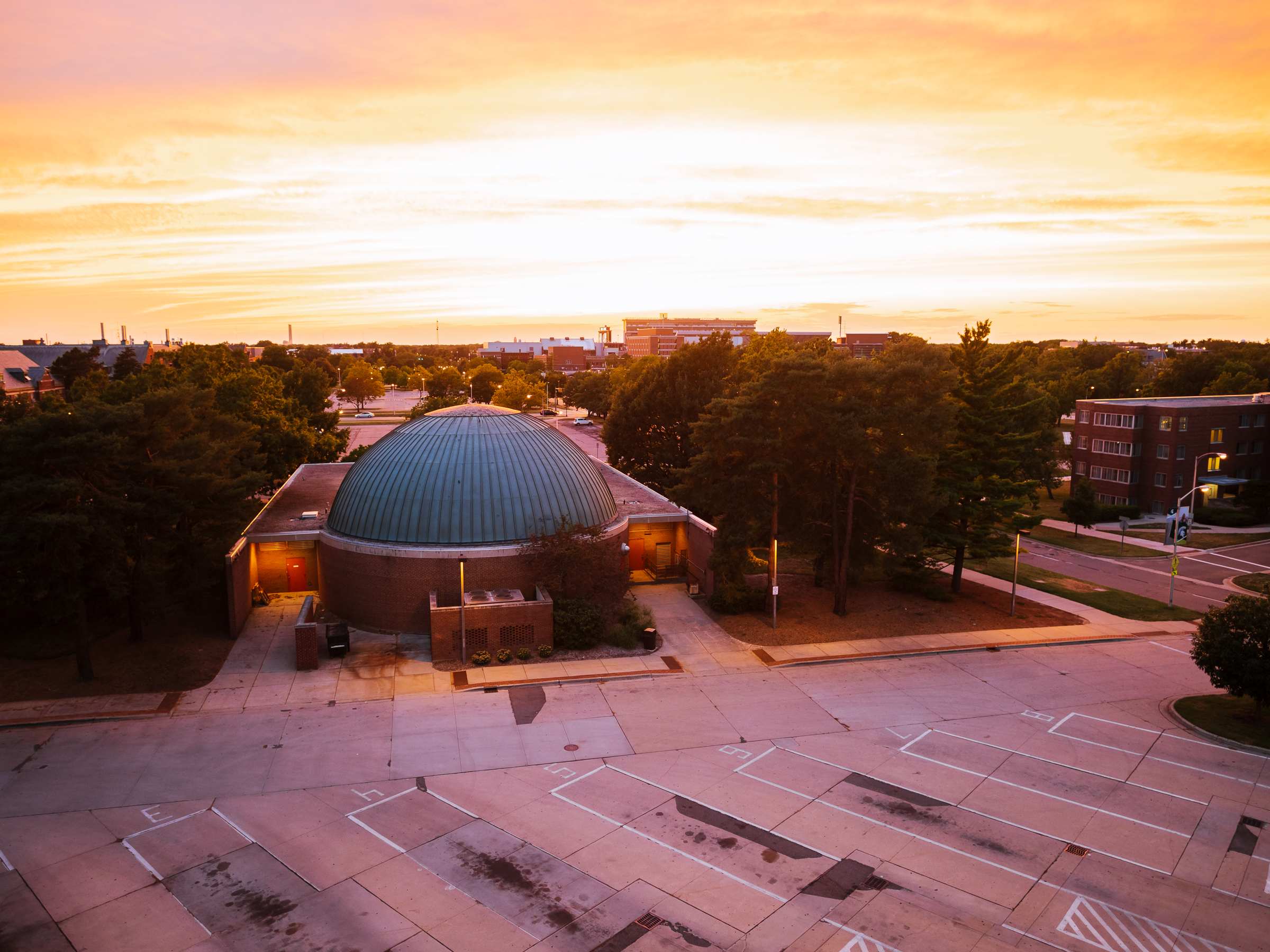
- Interactive map of the Abrams Planetarium area

Website
- abramsplanetarium.org

Abrams Planetarium is the planetarium on the campus of Michigan State University, Michigan, United States.

== History ==
The Abrams Planetarium opened in 1963, and has had an estimated one million visitors since then. As a branch of the Department of Physics and Astronomy at MSU, the Abrams Planetarium is dedicated to teaching astronomy to the public. The planetarium is named after Talbert "Ted" Abrams and his wife Leota. Ted was a pioneer in aerial photography and Leota made donations to the university. The building was designed by Ralph Calder Associates from Detroit. It has been renovated numerous times both inside and out; the most recent change is the addition of windows in 1995.

== Talbert Abrams ==
Talbert Abrams was born on August 17, 1896, in Tekonsha, Michigan. During his youth, Abrams had aviation related jobs in Michigan, Ohio, and New York. While in New York, he attended Curtiss Aviation School and graduated in 1916. He received his Federation Aeronautique Internationale Pilot's which was signed by Orville Wright. He joined the US Marines in 1917 and worked on taking aerial photographs of enemy activity. In 1920, he left the Marines to create his own business, ABC Airlines, later the Abrams Aerial Survey Corporation. He later founded Abrams Instrument Corporation, which specialized in designing high-tech aerial photography equipment. During World War II he designed the Abrams P-1 Explorer and Explorer II. After his retirement in 1961, he and his wife traveled around the world several times and visited 96 countries. Abrams died on August 16, 1990.

== Areas of the planetarium ==
The planetarium has three main areas: the exhibit hall, the black light gallery, and the sky theater. The main entrance opens into the exhibit hall which is 3000 square feet and has displays including pictures, telescopes, and Earth and Moon globes. It also serves as a waiting area for the shows and has a gift shop. The black light gallery is a curved gallery featuring astronomical images painted in fluorescent paint and lit by ultraviolet lights. The sky theater is fifty feet in diameter with a fifty-foot dome. The inside of the dome is made of perforated aluminum and is painted white, it serves as the projection screen. The theater holds one hundred and fifty people and each seat has a different angle of tilt so each viewer has the same view of the projection. The control console is located in the rear of the theater.

== Spitz Projector ==
When the planetarium was first opened, it was installed with a Spitz Intermediate Space Transit Planetarium projector. The projector was highly advanced for its time, weighing almost 1000 pounds less than similar projectors of its time, allowing it to move in ways most projectors could not. The Spitz projected using lights and lenses, with a star hemisphere map on each end of the projector. Each side of the projector has 4000 holes to represent the night sky and is lit with high pressure xenon gas lamps inside the arc lamps. It duplicates the motions of the five naked eye planets: Mercury, Venus, Mars, Jupiter and Saturn. The Spitz was retired in 1993 after thirty years of use.

== Digistar II projector ==
Abrams Planetarium now has an Evans and Sutherland Digistar projection system, installed in early 1993 and upgraded to a Digistar II in the summer of 1999. The projector is based entirely on computer graphics. It has a seven-inch monochrome flat screen display with a fisheye lens to magnify and focus the image on the curved ceiling. The Digistar has a resolution of 8000 by 8000 pixels. Its graphics processing computer takes numerical data and manipulates it to compensate for the domed projection surface. It can also rapidly transform shapes and perspectives to create the illusion of motion, for example, travelling through the Solar System at a high velocity.

== Digistar 5 projector ==
In August, 2014 in celebration of its 50th anniversary, the Digistar II projector was retired and replaced with a fulldome digital system known as Digistar 5. This system uses two digital projectors located on either side of the dome. The new system is in full color and is capable of showing full-dome planetarium shows that are often animated videos warped to fill the dome. It is also capable of simulating the night sky, flying through the universe, importing with 3-D models, and showing high-resolution terrain data of Earth and Mars. It has a projection resolution of 4K.

== Public services ==
The planetarium offers a sky watching service called Sky Calendar. It has a sheet for each month and illustrates the positions of the Moon, the planets and zodiacal constellations. It has over 10000 paid subscribers and has appeared in issues of Science and Children. It has received awards and good reviews from astronomical publications such as Sky & Telescope, Mercury, and Scientific American.

The planetarium hosts monthly meetings for members of the Capitol Area Astronomy Association, a group of hobbyists.

== Shows and programs information ==
The Abrams Planetarium offers public programs throughout the year, including shows on Friday, Saturday, and Sunday. Evening shows are followed by outdoor observations if sky conditions permit. The planetarium offers group packages that cater to preschoolers, kindergartners through grade five, grade six and up, and home schoolers.
