= Edgley Optica =

British low-speed light aircraft

EA-7 Optica
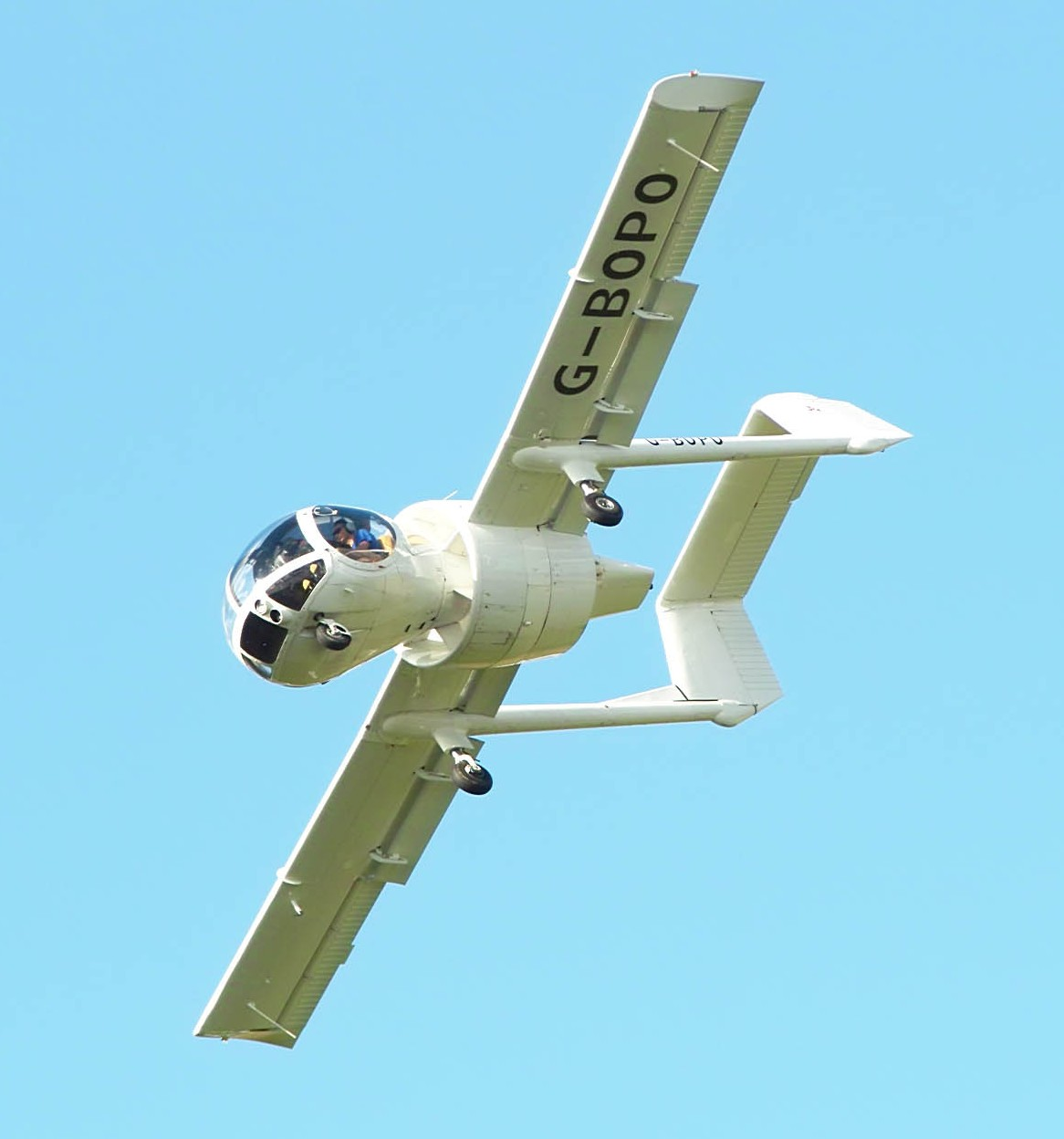
- Edgley Optica G-BOPO at the 2008 Sywell Airshow

General information
- Type: Observation
- National origin: United Kingdom
- Manufacturer: Edgley
- Designer: John Edgley
- Number built: 22

History
- First flight: 14 December 1979

The Edgley EA-7 Optica is a British light aircraft designed for low-speed observation work, and intended as a low-cost alternative to helicopters. The Optica has a loiter speed of 130 km/h (70 kn; 81 mph) and a stall speed of 108 km/h (58 kn; 67 mph).

The aircraft's distinctive appearance has led to it being known as the "bug-eye" in some popular reports.

== Design and development ==
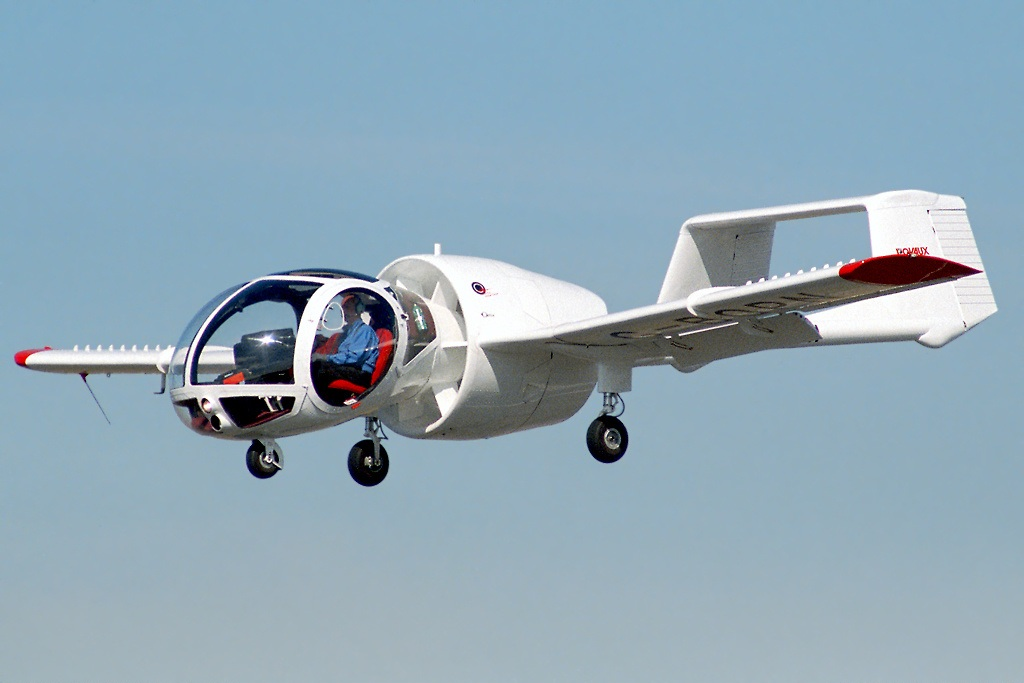
Farnborough, 1990

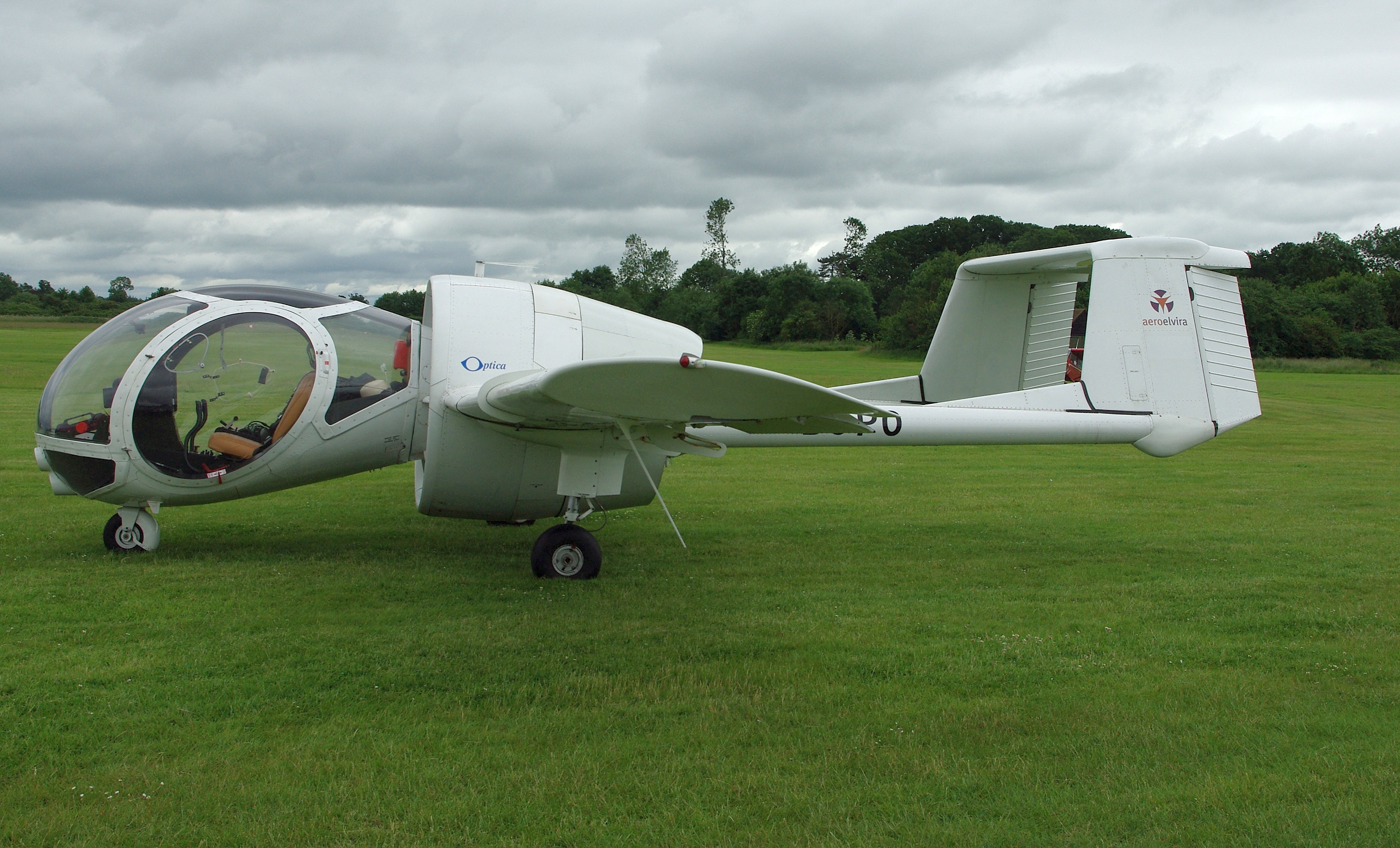
Old Warden, June 2014

The Optica project began in 1974 with a company, Edgley Aircraft Limited, formed by John Kelsey Edgley who, with a small team, designed and built the original prototype. In 1982, institutional investors bought into the project and set up a production line at Old Sarum Airfield in Wiltshire. Over the next three years, the company was built up to full manufacturing capability, the aircraft received UK certification, and the first customer aircraft was delivered. Despite this success, the additional investment necessary for the final phase of full production was not forthcoming, the business went into receivership, and John Edgley was forced out. With new owners, aircraft on the production line were completed, and the Optica entered service.

The aircraft has an unusual configuration with a fully glazed forward cabin, reminiscent of a Hiller Model 360 or Hughes Model 269 helicopter, that provides 270° panoramic vision and almost vertical downward vision for the pilot and two passengers. The aircraft has twin booms with twin rudders and a high-mounted tailplane. It is powered by a Lycoming flat-six normally-aspirated engine situated behind the cabin and driving a fixed pitch ducted fan. Due to the ducted fan, the aircraft is exceptionally quiet. The aircraft has a fixed tricycle undercarriage with the nosewheel offset to the left. The wings are unswept and untapered. The aircraft is of fairly standard all-metal construction, with a stressed skin of aluminium.

== Operational history ==
The Optica, powered by a 160 hp (119 kW) Lycoming IO-320 engine, made its maiden flight on 14 December 1979 when it was flown by Squadron Leader Angus McVitie, the chief pilot of the Cranfield College of Aeronautics.

The Optica, upgraded to the more powerful Lycoming IO-540, entered production in 1983. Edgley Aircraft Limited obtained its initial Civil Aviation Authority certification on 8 February 1985.

A total of 22 Opticas were built, while construction of a 23rd began but was not completed. Ten aircraft were destroyed in an arson attack at the factory.

The Optica went through several changes of ownership, until FLS Aerospace (Lovaux Ltd) took over the rights, together with the design and manufacturing rights to the Sprint: a two-seat ab-initio trainer that had been designed by Sydney Holloway in Cornwall UK at about the same time as the Optica. Lovaux had intended to develop both aircraft, with the Sprint intended as the military trainer for the UK forces. However, the Sprint was not adopted for this role, and Lovaux cancelled both projects.

The Optica and the Sprint together then passed through other owners until, in 2007, they were offered to John Edgley who formed a new company, AeroElvira Limited, with three former employees of Edgley Aircraft (Chris Burleigh, Fin Colson and Dave Lee) who at that time were working on both projects for the then-owners. The new company successfully put G-BOPO back into service as a UK demonstrator, with a first return-to-service flight on 3 June 2008. In August 2016 Interflight Global (IFG) announced plans to start a valuation of the dormant Optica programme with a view to relaunching production. In December 2016, IFG completed its valuation and in June 2017, delivered an LOI to AeroElvira to continue with due diligence, appraisal and further steps to re launch the EA-7 Optica aircraft programme in the 2018–19 timeframe. IFG planned to develop, market and support the Optica, outsourcing the fabrication and final assembly to an FAA/EASA Part 23 certified OEM.

== Accidents and incidents ==
On 15 May 1985, Optica G-KATY crashed, killing its Hampshire Constabulary pilot and his photographer passenger. The UK Department of Transport Air Accidents Investigation Branch found, inter alia, that: "There was no indication that either structural or mechanical failure had occurred or of flying control malfunction or jamming." and that "The final loss of control was caused by either the aircraft stalling in a turn at a high angle of bank, or the nose dropping."

On 11 March 1990, G-BMPL, while in flight, sustained damage to the ducted fan and hub assembly and minor airframe damage. The pilot performed a successful forced approach landing: there were no injuries and no further damage to the aircraft. A subsequent investigation discovered cracks resulting from metal fatigue on the fan hub. The manufacturer issued a service bulletin calling for a hub inspection before further flight, and the UK Civil Aviation Authority issued a Mandatory Airworthiness Notice (No. 004–05–90). The Optica fan has now been replaced by one designed and manufactured by Hoffmann Propeller.

== Specifications ==
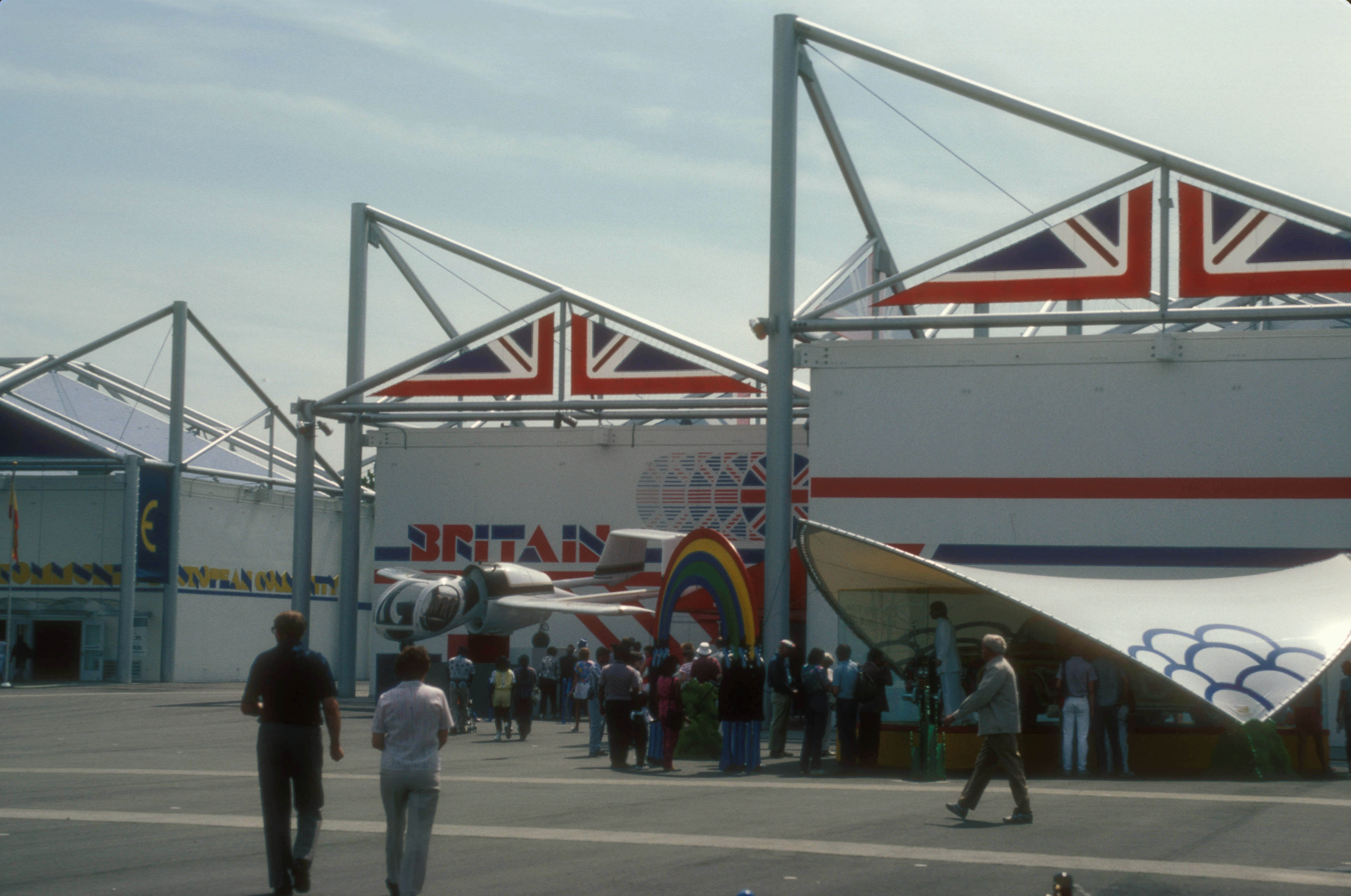
An Optica exhibited at the UK pavilion of Canada's Expo 86

Data from Jane's All the World's Aircraft 1988–89

General characteristics

- Crew: 3
- Length: 8.15 m (26 ft 9 in)
- Wingspan: 12.00 m (39 ft 4 in)
- Height: 2.31 m (7 ft 7 in)
- Wing area: 15.84 m^{2} (170.5 sq ft)
- Aspect ratio: 9.1:1
- Airfoil: NASA GA(W)-1
- Empty weight: 948 kg (2,090 lb)
- Max takeoff weight: 1,315 kg (2,899 lb)
- Fuel capacity: 250 L (66 US gal; 55 imp gal) useful capacity
- Powerplant: 1 × Textron Lycoming IO-540-V4A5D air-cooled flat-six engine, 190 kW (260 hp)
- Propellers: 5-bladed fixed-pitch ducted fan

Performance

- Maximum speed: 213 km/h (132 mph, 115 kn)
- Cruise speed: 130 km/h (81 mph, 70 kn) (loiter speed, 40% power)
- Stall speed: 108 km/h (67 mph, 58 kn) outboard flaps up
- Never exceed speed: 259 km/h (161 mph, 140 kn)
- Range: 1,056 km (656 mi, 570 nmi) at 130 km/h (81 mph; 70 kn) (45-minute reserves)
- Endurance: 8 h (at loiter speed)
- Service ceiling: 4,275 m (14,026 ft)
- Rate of climb: 4.1 m/s (810 ft/min)

== See also ==
Aircraft of comparable role, configuration, and era

- Abrams P-1 Explorer, also a twin-boom pusher observation plane
- Brdischka HB23 Scanliner
- Heston JC.6
- Seabird Seeker
