= Trago Mills =

English department store chain

- Type: Private
- Industry: Retail
- Founder: Mike Robertson
- Number of locations: 4 (Falmouth, Liskeard, Newton Abbot, Merthyr Tydfil)
- Area served: Southwest England and South Wales
- Owner: Bruce Robertson
- Website: www.trago.co.uk

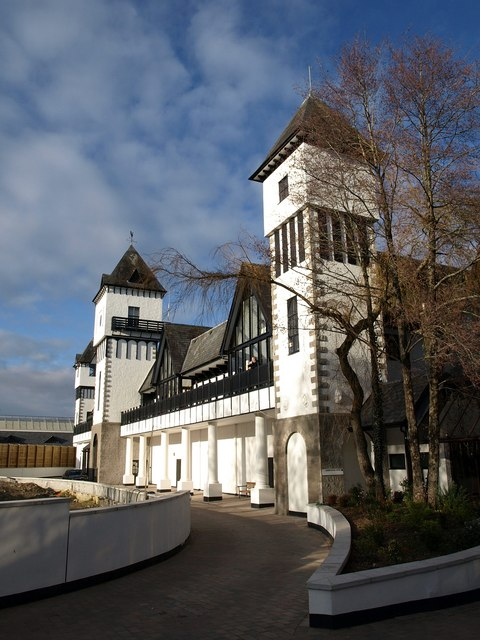
Newton Abbot store.

Trago Mills is a chain of four department stores in south Cornwall, south Devon in England, and south Wales. It owns a site with an amusement park and some independent businesses, adjoining the store near Newton Abbot.

Three are in town outskirts: Liskeard in Cornwall; Newton Abbot in Devon, and Merthyr Tydfil in Wales. Another is in Falmouth, Cornwall. The company emphasises cheapness and variety of stock.

== Background ==
The chain was established by businessman Mike Robertson who bought the Liskeard site in the early 1960s after moving to Cornwall following his wife's death.

== Sites ==
The company's buildings at Liskeard and Newton Abbot were designed by Charles Hunt of St Neot, Liskeard, whom they appointed in 1978. The buildings have a castle-inspired profile, with white towers and black-framed windows.

Trago also experimented with smaller stores, such as a 'Trago Mini Mart' .

=== Liskeard ===
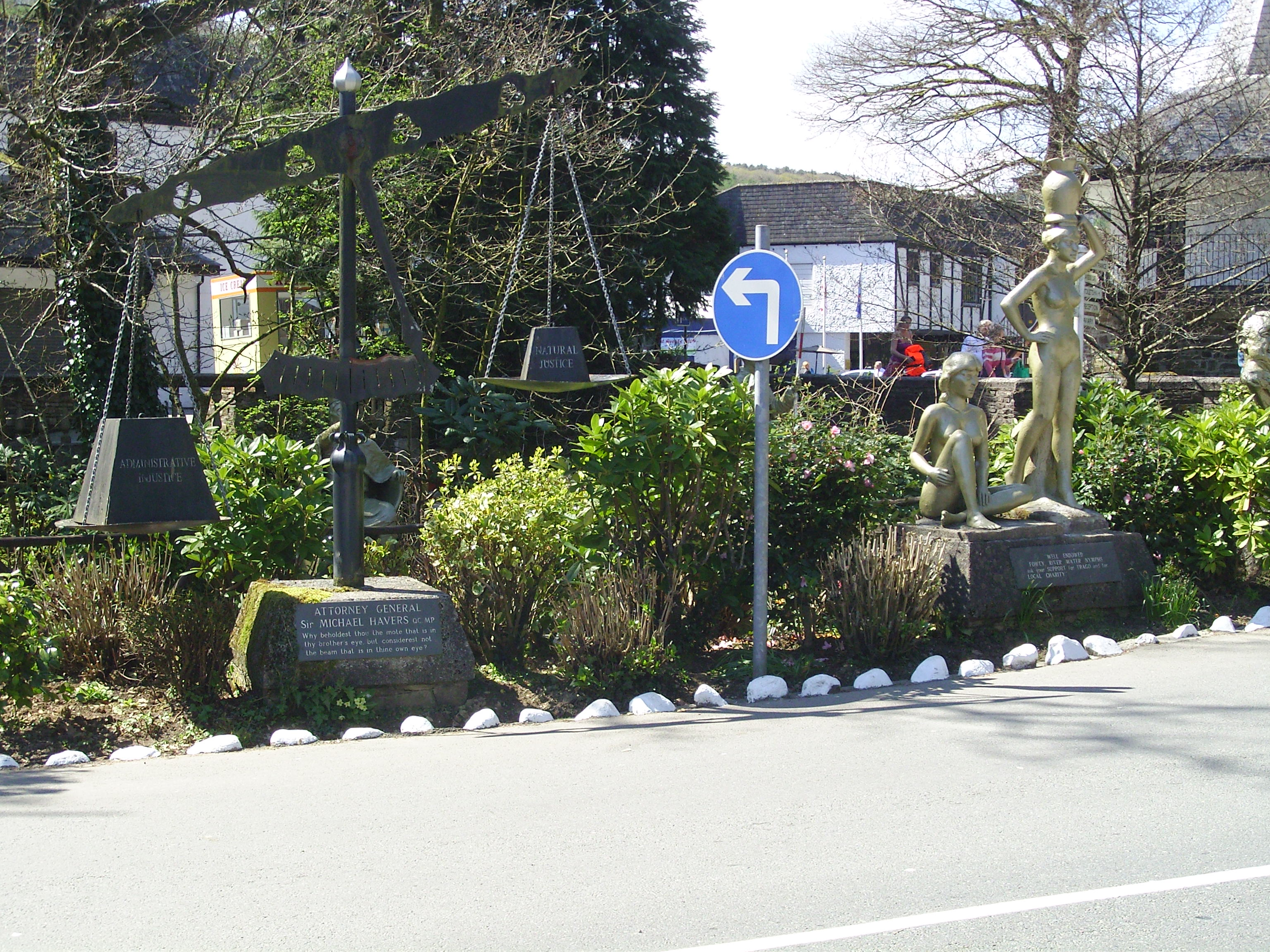
Some of the political statues outside the Liskeard store

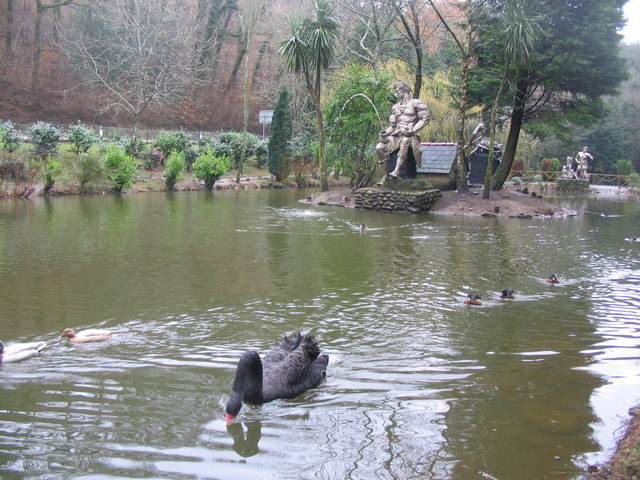
Pond and statues

The first Trago Mills store was at Liskeard and started life as a small shed, selling items founder Mike Robertson had bought on trips to larger towns some distance away. The current Liskeard store, five miles west of the town just off the A38 at Two Waters Foot, has several acres of parkland and lakes, with several other local businesses on the site. There are statues at the entrance. One of them is of Attorney General Sir Michael Havers QC. MP, reciting

Why beholdest thou the mote that is in thy brother's eye, but considerest not the beam that is in thine own eye?

— proverb, from Matthew ch7 v1-5 The Mote and the Beam (or the Speck and the Plank)

.

=== Newton Abbot ===
The Newton Abbot site is the largest of the four and covers over 100 acres (0.4 km^{2}) of land. It has several independent businesses. A garden centre, the largest in the south west, was opened on the site in 2009, followed in 2010 by a new restaurant.

In October 2004, a large fire broke out in the main building of the branch. Thirty fire appliances and over 200 fire fighters tackled the blaze, the largest to occur in Devon for several years. Buildings involved were completely rebuilt.

In summer 2016, Trago2Clear, a clearance outlet for all Trago products closed. On 28 September 2016, demolition took place of the Old Clearance Shed and former Sarah's Pantry Cafe. A new £3 million DIY and Trade centre opened in summer 2017.

In July 2022, the petrol station at the store became the cheapest place to purchase fuel in the UK, with prices there almost 25p cheaper than the national average, causing long queues on the nearby road.

==== Trago Family Fun Park ====
Trago Family Fun Park
- Interactive map of Trago Family Fun Park
- Location: Trago Mills, Newton Abbot, Devon, England
- Coordinates: 50.557°N 3.666°W
- Owner: Trago Mills
- Operating season: All Year (Most Rides Closed In Bad Weather)

Attractions
- Total: 11
- Website: http://www.trago.co.uk/

The Newton Abbot store had a leisure park attached, called the Trago Family Fun Park. This was opened shortly after the construction of the permanent store buildings and now covers over 100 acres (0.40 km^{2}). Its features are:

- Bickington Steam Railway, a 10¼-inch gauge railway that runs from the centre of the leisure park to the front car park, loops round three lakes, then returns to the 'Leisure Central' station.
- The OO gauge Trago Mills Model Railway which was completed in 1989 after one year of construction by a team of 18 people. Measuring 88 by 14 feet (26.8 by 4.3 m), at the time of its completion it was the largest model railway in the UK. Open Friday to Sunday and looked after by an extremely dedicated person.
- Eagle Go-Karts imported from the US, an indoor ice skating rink, a shooting gallery, remote-control trucks and boats, trampolines and crazy golf. Also includes various picnic areas and an animal park with horses, donkeys, pigs and other animals.
- By the park are small shops, cafés and restaurants. Local produce includes fish and chips and fresh fudge.

As part of its scaling down of business, the family fun park closed at the end of 2025 with just the miniature railway remaining open.

=== Falmouth ===
The Falmouth store, near the National Maritime Museum Cornwall, is the smallest of the four.

=== Merthyr Tydfil ===
After owning a former factory site in Merthyr Tydfil in South Wales for nearly a decade, work began on the new shopping centre in autumn 2016. The site's multi-million pound store has 17 small towers. The store opened in April 2018.

== Controversies and legal disputes ==
Statues of local political figures and officials the owner believed were opposed to his development "welcome" shoppers to the Liskeard store. One source of opposition may have been that planning permission did not always precede building work

Robertson's local newspaper advertisements resulted in three newspapers carrying the adverts being successfully sued for libel by Sir Edward Heath, when some of his comments became highly personalised.

Robertson placed advertisements in the 1980s and 1990s calling for the castration of gay men. The United Kingdom Advertising Standards Authority ruled against Trago Mills and demanded the withdrawal of all advertisements in 1998. Trago still occasionally runs inflammatory copy within their ads, one entitled "For any cash strapped Moslems reading this…" appeared in the Falmouth Packet in 2009 to promote a book by senior UKIP official David Challice.

With his son and successor, Bruce, Robertson supported Eurosceptic political parties, most recently the United Kingdom Independence Party (UKIP). Robertson threatened to refuse to stop using imperial measures in his stores, attributing UK metrication to the European Union (Trago today sells goods in metric quantities, sometimes with imperial equivalents, in line with the law). He remains opposed to speculative immigration from Eastern Europeans. Robertson supports job-specific immigration, more liberally than some in UKIP. In January 2007, the Mid Devon Star suggested this was hypocritical, as his large Newton Abbot site employed around 30 Polish people.

In September 2011, the company was fined £199,588 after admitting five breaches of the Environmental Protection Act 1990. This followed the discovery of several thousand tonnes of dumped waste, including asbestos, at its Newton Abbot and Liskeard sites. The fine was reduced to £65,000 in January 2012, after an Exeter Crown Court judge accepted that Trago Mills had paid nearly £500,000 in clean-up costs.

In 2014, Trago Mills was featured on BBC's Fake Britain, after local Trading Standards discovered fake top-brand shampoo on sale in store. Trago management said that the product had been purchased from a reliable source. They claimed the counterfeit products were so close to the originals, that it took testing to identify it as a copy. Cornwall Trading Standards agreed, closing the investigation into the store.

In June 2018, following the opening of the company's store in Merthyr Tydfil, some locals threatened to boycott the shop after Robertson criticised bilingual education and described bilingual English and Welsh signage as "visual clutter".

== Trago Mills Ltd (Aircraft Division) ==
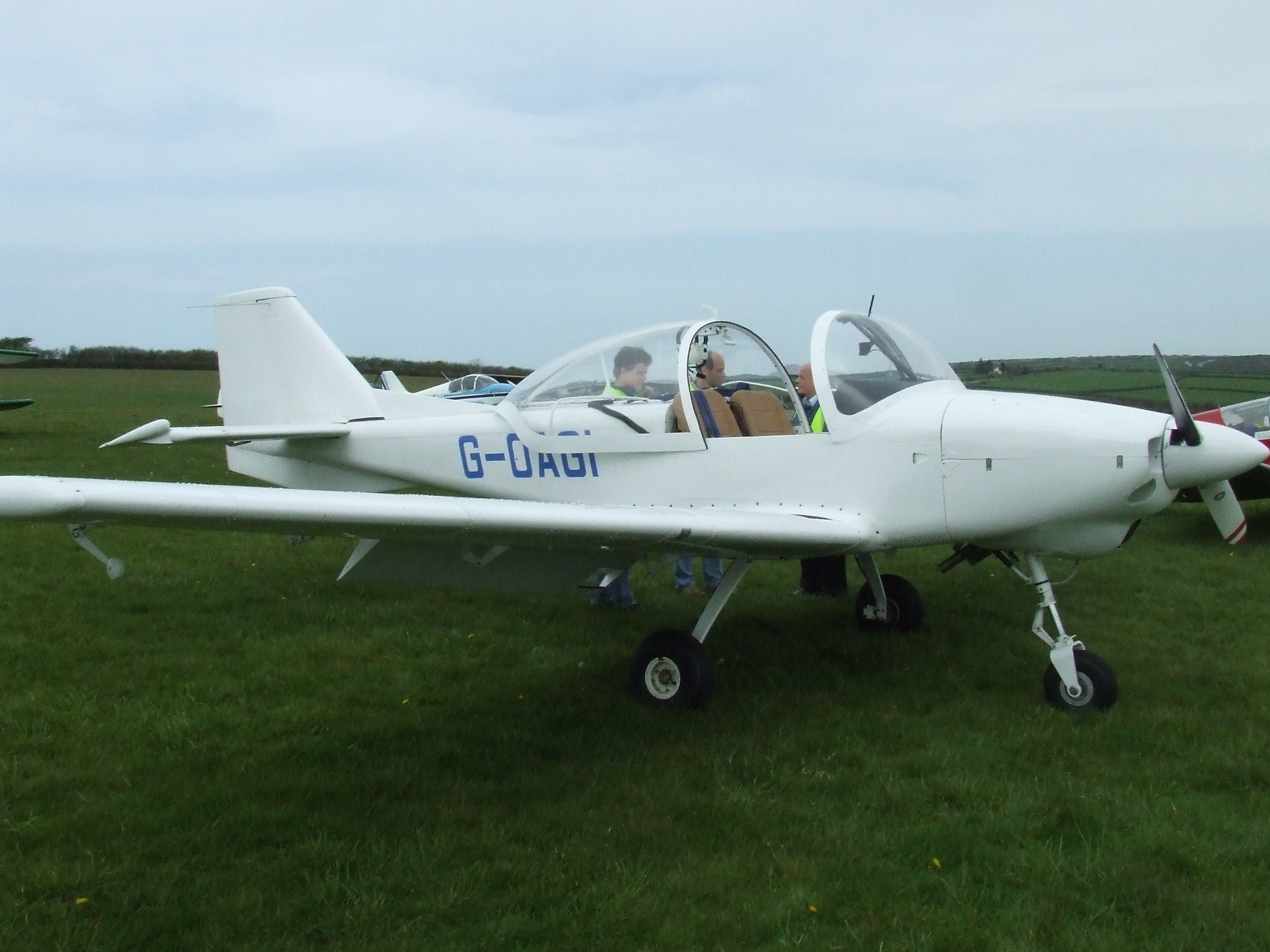
The FLS Sprint seen here at the fly-in at Bodmin Airfield, 3 May 2008.

In the early 1980s, Trago Mills elected to design and build its own aircraft that could be sold to the British military as a trainer to replace the then ageing "Bulldog" fleet. The result was the Trago Mills SAH-1, which first flew on 23 August 1983. Passed over by the armed forces, the rights to the design have since changed hands several times, the latest version being the FLS Sprint.
