= David Abrahams =

David Abrahams may refer to:

- David Abrahams (businessman) (born 1944), British businessman
- David Abrahams (computer programmer), American computer programmer
- David Abrahams (mathematician) (born 1958), English mathematician
- David Abrahams (swimmer) (born 2001) American Paralympic swimmer

== See also ==
- David Abraham (disambiguation)
