= Vikki Abrahams =

English-American reproductive immunologist

Academic background
- Education: B.Sc., Immunology, 1996, PhD, Immunology, 2000, University College London
- Thesis: The role of immunoglobulin receptors in the pathogenesis of rheumatoid arthritis (2000)

Academic work
- Institutions: Yale University School of Medicine

Vikki Martyne Abrahams is an English–American reproductive immunologist. She is a full professor of obstetrics, gynecology and reproductive sciences at the Yale School of Medicine. Her research focuses on understanding the role of innate immune toll-like receptor and NOD-like receptor family members in placental and maternal-fetal immune responses.

== Early life and education ==
Abrahams earned her Bachelor of Science degree and PhD from the University College London.

== Career ==
Abrahams came to the United States for her postdoctoral work at Dartmouth Medical School and Yale University in the field of reproductive immunology before accepting a faculty position in 2004. In her role as an assistant professor of obstetrics and gynecology, Abrahams co-authored a study which found that there was a specific defence mechanism used by the immune system which was imitated by cancer cells in order to fight off the effects of cancer drugs like paclitaxel. She was later awarded a one-year grant of $73,284 from the Lupus Research Alliance for her project titled "Effect of Antiphospholipid Antibodies on Trophoblast Function in Pregnancy." In 2010, Abrahams continued her research into pregnancy complications using a three-year grant from the American Heart Association to advance her work. She also co-authored another study which uncovered how hormone progesterone act to prevent preterm birth.

Abrahams research focuses on understanding the role of innate immune toll-like receptor and NOD-like receptor family members in placental and maternal-fetal immune responses. In 2014, she was the senior author on a study exploring whether an anti-malaria drug could be used to treat obstetrical antiphospholipid syndrome. Two years later, she was the recipient of the 2016 Novel Research Grant from the Lupus Research Institute to conduct innovative work in lupus. She used this grant to lead a study identifying how the Zika virus infects the placenta.

In 2019, Abrahams was the recipient of the annual American Society for Reproductive Immunology Award as someone "who has made outstanding contributions to the area of reproductive immunology."
