= International Life Assurance Society =

19th-century British insurance company

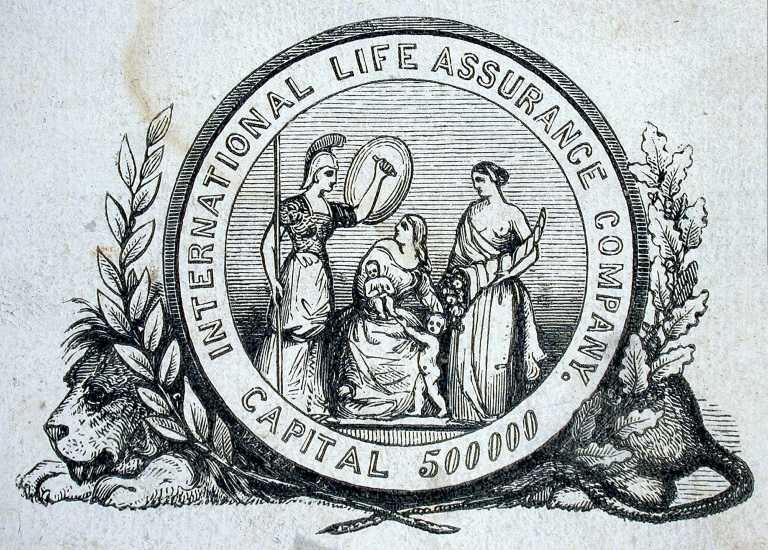
- Formerly: National Loan Fund Life Assurance Society
- Industry: Life insurance
- Founded: 1837
- Founder: T. Lamie Murray
- Defunct: 1869
- Fate: Liquidation
- Headquarters: London
- Areas served: Great Britain, Ireland, France and North America

The International Life Assurance Society was a 19th-century British insurance company. Its operations in the United States, particularly in the state of Massachusetts, caused it to play a major role in the development of insurance regulation in that country.

The Society was founded in 1837 under its original name, the National Loan Fund Life Assurance Society. The "Loan Fund" part of the name reflected the Society's practice of allowing insureds to borrow back a portion of their premiums, an unusual feature in its day but one that is now commonly practiced in the form of "policy loans". From the very start, the Society established a presence in the major cities of Britain and, within ten years, had done the same in Canada and the United States. By the mid 1850s, the Society had become the sixth largest insurance company in the United States and, by far, the largest British insurer operating there.

Signs of financial difficulties arose in the early 1850s. By then, the Society had changed its operating practices to reduce the amount of funds that could be borrowed by the policyholders. At about the same time, the Society's founder (T. Lamie Murray) left his leadership position, not only in the Society but also in a related enterprise (the Equitable Fire Insurance Company), doing so amidst allegations of financial improprieties. And towards the end of the decade, the Society faced difficulties from a different front. A new Massachusetts law required insurers to demonstrate that they were holding assets sufficient to meet their obligations to policyholders. The International was unable to satisfy the Massachusetts authorities on this point, largely because it insisted on using an actuarial methodology that was unacceptable to those authorities. This, in turn, sparked a debate that was played out in the general newspapers in the United States.

Similar difficulties soon arose with the newly established insurance department of New York. This, along with generally difficult conditions related to the American Civil War, caused the Society to cease most of its operations in the United States by the mid 1860s. A few years later, the Society was placed under court-supervised liquidation in London. It ceased independent operations in 1869.

Throughout its existence, the Society was a party to various insurance-related litigation with policyholders or their beneficiaries. Several of those cases served to establish precedent in the application of insurance law. The most notable of them was Molton v. Camroux, which addressed the question of how contract law is applied in cases of insanity.

== Early years ==
=== Founding of the company ===
The National Loan Fund Life Assurance Society was organized in 1837 by Thomas Lamie Murray, an Irish banker who was also serving as the founder and director of the recently established National Bank of Ireland. The society's initial investment group included nine Londoners drawn from fields outside the banking or insurance industries, two of whom were John Elliotson and Robert Hollond. These nine, plus Murray, became the Society's initial corps of officers and directors. The society's existence as a corporate entity was acknowledged by an act of Parliament, the National Loan Fund Life Assurance Society Act 1838 (1 & 2 Vict. c. xcii), in July 1838, for which royal assent came later that same month.

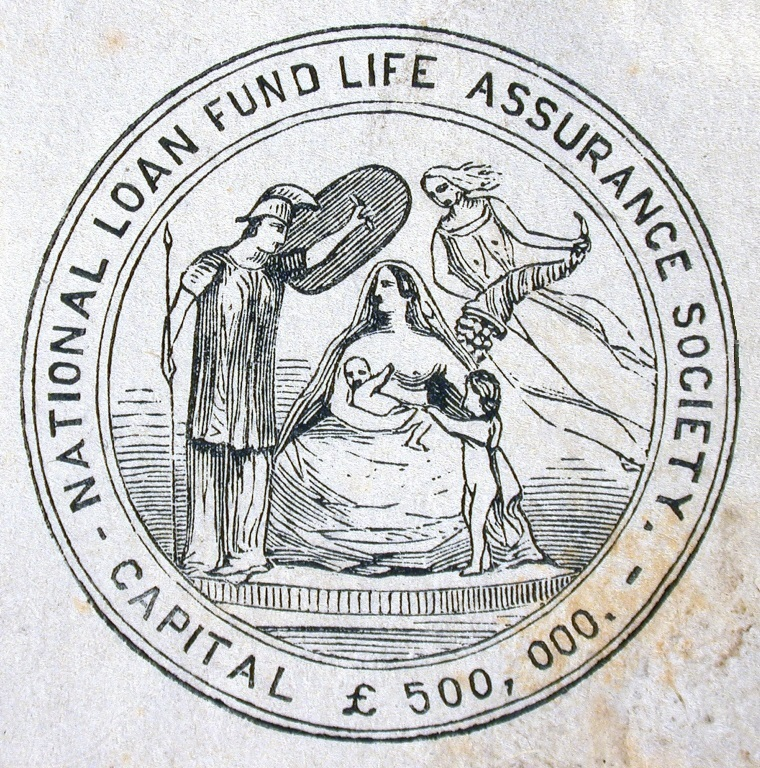

Shares in the society were priced at £10 each and ownership was divided across 50,000 shares. Accordingly, the company's paid-in capital was intended to be £500,000 (equivalent to about $70 million in current U.S. dollars). However, investors were required to pay only £2.25 (i.e., two pounds and five shillings) when "subscribing" and fewer than half the shares were actually subscribed. A financial report from 1852 (i.e., fifteen years after establishment of the society) showed paid-in capital of about £50,000, despite the fact that the society's promotional material from the very beginning typically described the company as possessing the full £500,000.

Under the society's deed of settlement, Murray was to be the chairman of the board of directors and could not be ousted from the position. He was also guaranteed, in addition to his salary as an officer and director, a lifetime annual payment of 5% of the company's profits, with a further guarantee that if he died during the first 28 years, payments would continue to be made to his heirs for the remainder of that 28-year period. In addition, Murray was to receive a one-time payment of five shillings (i.e., £0.25) per subscribed share as reimbursement for the initial expenses of founding the society.

Investors received annual interest payments equal to 5% of their actual paid-in capital. They also received one-third of the company's net profits, allocated amongst the individual investors according to the number of shares held. At the shareholders meeting in May 1841, the investors voted to cancel 25,000 unsubscribed shares and to double the nominal value of each share to £20. Doing so left the intended level of paid-in capital at £500,000 but effectively doubled each investor's share of the company profits. The first distribution of profits took place in 1843 and proceeded annually thereafter.

=== 1838–1850 ===
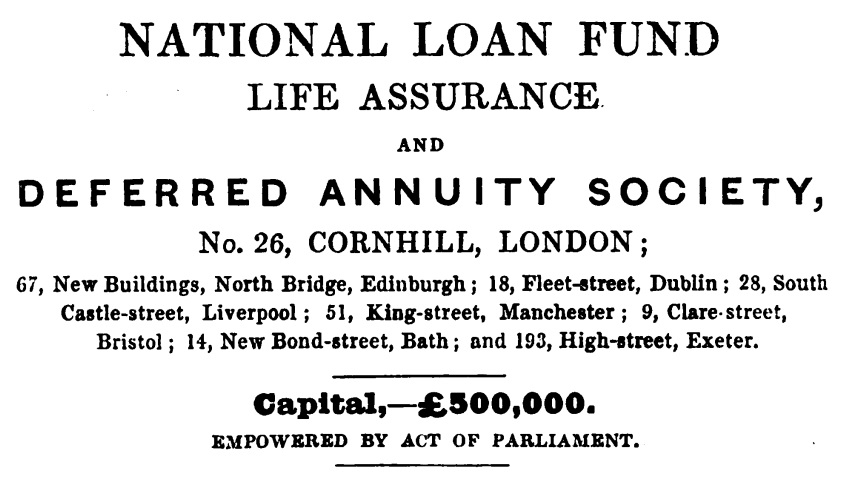
Excerpt from an 1840 advertisement

At the outset, the National Loan established offices in the larger cities of England, as well as in Ireland and Scotland (see the pictured 1840 advertisement). By the mid 1840s, operations had also been extended into the United States and into both the English- and French-speaking parts of Canada. By the end of the decade, it had also established an office in France.

The company targeted the working-class market, which its officers variously described as the "industrious classes" or as people with "means more limited or uncertain than those more favoured by fortune". The company's growth in this market was helped by its well-advertised willingness to accept premium payments on a monthly basis. But the cornerstone of their marketing was the feature that gave rise to having the phrase "Loan Fund" in the company name—policyholders were eligible for taking out loans from the company, in amounts up to two-thirds of their paid premiums. Allowing what are now called "policy loans" was essentially unknown in both England and the United States, and did not become commonplace in the latter country until the late 1840s.

The National Loan also sold a deferred annuity product, which operated as a savings vehicle for persons willing to make regular payments to the company (and these payments could be made as frequently as weekly). At a pre-specified age, typically between 50 and 65, the policy would convert into an annuity that made regular payments back to the policyholder for the remainder of the policyholder's life. Here too loans could be taken out in amounts up to two-thirds of the premiums already paid. In addition, the unborrowed portion of the "two-thirds of paid premiums" was payable as a death benefit in the event the policyholder died prior to reaching the annuity-commencement age. This product was such a major element of the company's marketing strategy that its advertisements during the 1840s typically added the words "and Deferred Annuity" after "Assurance" to the company's name (although its legal name was never changed to reflect this).

=== 1850s ===
T. Lamie Murray, the company's founder and permanent board chairman, resigned from his position in 1852, citing health reasons. However, an audit report from later that year noted a "considerable defect ... in the want of proper discipline and regularity of system" in conducting the Society's operations. The report also noted the auditors' expectation of "a clear course of increased success ... and the happy results which cannot but follow the recent alterations that have taken place" (the latter, presumably, a reference to Murray's departure). By the time he resigned, trouble had been surrounding Murray for at least two years. In 1850, the auditors of Murray's earlier venture, the National Bank of Ireland, accused the bank's directors of "gross inattention to the interests of the bank". And the auditors leveled a separate accusation at Murray himself–that he was using his influence as a director to "promote the interests of an Assurance Company" (meaning the National Loan). The directors responded by firing the auditors. But this did not alter the general mood of the shareholders, who voted to oust several directors, including Murray, in 1851. When reporting the incident in his history of banking in Ireland, Malcolm Dillon noted that the National Loan was at that time generally known to be "in an embarrassed condition". The situation was not much better with Murray's more recent venture, the Equitable Fire Insurance Company (for which see the discussion below).

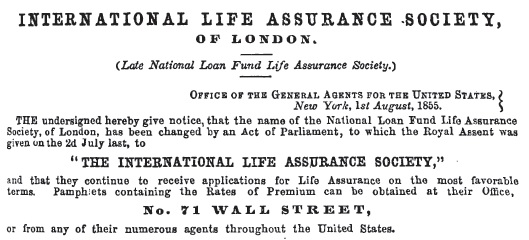
Excerpt from an 1856 advertisement

The National Loan continued to declare profits (and dividends) into the early 1850s. Nonetheless, the company's financial condition was weakening, caused in part by the failure of its deferred-annuity product. Despite heavy promotion, it never became popular, accounting in 1849 for only about 2% of total premium revenue. One outward sign of the weakened condition was a change in the terms for receiving policy loans. In 1850, the National Loan reduced the amount that could be borrowed to one-half of the paid premiums, down from the original two-thirds, and even then only for policies under which the insured agreed to pay a slightly higher premium.

The company's change of name, to the International Life Assurance Society, took place in 1855. At that point, the Society held about 5% of the U.S. market share, making it the sixth largest life insurance company doing business in the United States (and by far the largest British company operating there). The auditors' report from 1852 had already noted "with infinite satisfaction" the United States branch of the Society, finding it "large and important".

== Massachusetts controversy ==
=== Background ===
In 1854, Massachusetts established an insurance commission and authorized it to examine all insurance companies doing business in the state, so as to verify compliance with various laws and to "ascertain the condition" of the companies. The law was amended in 1858 in two respects. First, it restructured the insurance commission, effectively replacing the existing commissioners with two new ones (Elizur Wright and George Sargent). Second, it strengthened the requirement that the commissioners examine the financial condition of life insurance companies, by explicitly requiring an annual actuarial valuation of every outstanding policy issued by each company doing business in the state.

The valuation process required each company to provide the state with detailed information on its policies. The process also required a methodology for quantifying the actuarial liability under each policy. The commissioner who had primary responsibility for this task, Elizur Wright, selected what is now called the net level premium reserve method. He also selected the set of factors (i.e., future mortality rates and the future rate of investment earnings) that would be needed when applying the method.

Under any reserve methodology for life insurance policies, the actuarial liability under the policy is equal to the present value of the amounts expected to be paid on account of the policy, offset by the present value of the amounts expected to be received from the policyholder via future premium payments. The amounts expected to be paid by the company include not just the contracted benefits themselves, but also the expenses that will be incurred in servicing the policy, as well as any dividends that will be paid to the policyholder in future years. The entire calculation is intended to quantify the amount of assets that need to be held "in reserve" for payment of those future benefits, expenses and dividends. Under the "net premium" variation used by Wright, there is no explicit estimate of future expenses and dividends. Instead, the first portion of the calculation (i.e., the present value of amounts expected to be paid by the company) reflects only the contracted benefits, and does not reflect any expenses or dividends that are also expected to be paid. This "error" is corrected in the second portion of the calculation, wherein the offset portion of the calculation uses a theoretical "net" premium that is typically much lower than the premium actually being paid by the policyholder. By offsetting a smaller amount for the present value of the expected future premiums, the future expenses and dividends are taken into account, albeit in an indirect manner.

=== Wright's reports ===
Wright's first report to the Massachusetts legislature included the results of his valuations of most of the life insurance companies doing business in the state. However, the International failed to provide the detailed policy information necessary for its valuation. Even though the law did impose a financial penalty for that failure, Wright agreed to waive it if the International ceased issuing any new policies in Massachusetts until such time as it did provide the information. In that initial Insurance Report, dated January 1859, Wright noted the situation, but opined that the International's capital was "apparently ample". He did add, however, that proof of the International's good financial condition would not be possible until the information was submitted to his office and advised "those who contemplate getting their lives assured in this company ... would do well, in our opinion, to await the same proof".

We will not undertake to say, positively, that concealment was the worm in this bud. Yet we are at a loss to conceive for what purpose such a bud could have been produced, if not to conceal the ravages of some worm among the assets. By an ingenious method of mixing up possessions with expectations, a few hatched chickens with a great many unhatched, and totally ignoring all future expenses, the Actuary makes out the society blessed with a balance of more than half a million of dollars of clear profit ... .

— excerpt from Wright's Supplemental Report. (italics in original)

The information was delivered in May 1859. Although that delivery brought the company back into compliance with the law, it prompted Wright to issue a supplemental report the next month that addressed only the International and that detailed his concern about its financial condition. He noted that, whereas each of the fourteen other companies that submitted data had assets that exceeded the amounts indicated by his reserve calculations, the assets of the International fell far short of that mark, being only about one-third of the indicated reserve requirement. And yet, the company was able to report itself to be in a surplus position through the use of a valuation methodology that did not anticipate any future payments other than those for death claims (i.e., no payments for operating expenses or dividends), but that did anticipate the full (i.e., the "gross", not the "net") premiums payable by the policyholders. Furthermore, that reported surplus was used to justify the payment of dividends to policyholders and shareholders, in an aggregate amount equal to about one-third of the International's existing assets. Wright also addressed other aspects of the company's financial records, accusing it of "squandering" its funds and pointedly observing that "it is not, perhaps, within our province ... to account for the disappearance of more than a million of dollars from the treasury of this institution". Despite all this, he concluded that Massachusetts law did not authorize him to suspend a company's operations based on its level of assets and recommended that the law be changed to give him that authority. Wright also recommended that companies from outside Massachusetts be required to maintain assets (within Massachusetts) in an amount equal to the net level premium reserve attributable to policies issued in Massachusetts.

=== Actuarial debate ===
Even though the International was not prevented from continuing its operations, it defended itself against Wright's accusations by submitting three actuarial opinions—one from consulting actuary Wesley S. B. Woolhouse, another from English actuary Francis Nieson, and a third from American mathematician Benjamin Peirce (who had been doing consulting work for some American insurance companies). These opinions were published in December 1859 in the New York Tribune, but it is unclear whether this was done at the instigation of Wright or of the International. By the end of December, Wright received written comments from two officers of the United States Life Insurance Company (their actuary, Nicholas De Groot and their corporate secretary, John Eadie), as well as a third comment from Sheppard Homans, an actuary with the Mutual Life Insurance Company. All of these opinions and comments were published in January 1860 in an appendix to Wright's annual report to the Massachusetts legislature.

The document in question is written in so unusual a tone and temper, and in language so far removed from the sober, deliberative style of our own official reports, that it is hard to believe it really authentic. It has so much partisan feeling and warmth of expression, and is so full of pointed personal allusion, that I am sure it is impossible to find anything similar to it among our own governmental records.

— excerpt from a report by Francis Neison, commenting on Wright's Supplemental Report.

The two English actuaries took issue with Wright's use of the net level premium method. Woolhouse's opinion was stated in his regular report to the International's directors. He did not go into depth, simply stating that the theoretical premiums used by Wright were "fictitious" and that the results were "fallacious and may be regarded purely as a fabrication". In contrast, Nieson's entire report addressed Wright's methodology. He questioned the mortality rates used by Wright and accused him of making a substantial arithmetical error, describing it as "a blunder which any ordinary clerk would have been careful to avoid". But Neison expressed a more basic concern over Wright's failure to include the premium amounts in his table of insurance values. He found this to be a deliberate exclusion, remarking that he was "forcibly struck by the systematic care with which, in every case, some element or other of their calculations was withheld, rendering it impossible for any one having only the data [in Wright's report] to check the results". Regarding Wright's use of the net level premium method, Neison described it as "dealing with a fiction, and not with facts". The opinion from American mathematician Peirce avoided any ad hominem attacks and glossed over most of the issues raised by Nieson. Instead, Peirce commented directly on the net level premium method, calling it "ideal and fictitious". He noted that its use was equivalent to assuming a liability for future expenses that was greater than the amount the International would actually need to meet those expenses. In such case, Peirce added, it was appropriate to consider the excess "to be profit at once, and divide it accordingly".

The two American actuaries supported Wright's methodology. Homans called Wright's Supplemental Report a "startling exposé" and agreed that the problem was the International's failure to reflect any liability for future expenses and dividends, while at the same time reflecting the full actuarial value of future premiums. He described such a valuation method as "disastrous in the extreme, and eminently destructive to the success of [the insurance system]". Homans also commented that, by the use of this technique, "a company in the last stages of insolvency may be made to appear in the most flourishing condition". De Groot's opinion was similar. He noted that the International's valuation method allowed it to recognize anticipated profits as a current asset. The error, De Groot stated, was that "time is essential to the development of profit. ... It is clear that no profit or loss can be realized by the mere act of issuing a life policy, until time has run and certain events have been declared for or against the company". And in an oblique reference to the criticisms from Benjamin Peirce, De Groot wrote that "the essential difference between valuations in gross and in net is liable to be overlooked by calculators and mathematicians in general, because the distinction is not so much an arithmetical as a commercial one". The letter from John Eadie did not address any actuarial details. Instead, Eadie simply agreed that it was improper for a life insurance company to reflect anticipated profits as an asset. He likened the practice to that of a merchant who declares a profit on inventory that has not yet been sold.

=== Aftermath ===
By the time Wright published these opinions and comments in his January 1860 report, the International had already missed its data submission deadline for 1859. Because it did not ever submit any further information, the International issued no more policies in Massachusetts.

A contemporaneous third-party discussion of the episode appeared in the April and May 1860 issues of Hunt's Merchants' Magazine.

== Last years ==
The International continued to do business in U.S. states other than Massachusetts, but quickly ran into difficulties with the newly established insurance department in the state of New York. Noting Wright's report, and noting further the company's failure to comply with New York law regarding the submission of policy data, the New York Superintendent of Insurance (William Barnes) denied access to the interest earnings on the $100,000 that the International had deposited with the state. Concern about the company persisted to the point where the Superintendent considered prohibiting the company from issuing any new policies in the state. But in his report for 1861 (issued in April 1862), he found the International's condition to be "not entirely hopeless" and, therefore, was willing to "afford the Society every facility for improving its condition". He did, however, order the International's American branch to cease repatriating funds to the home office in London.

Despite New York's forbearance, the International was facing difficult conditions caused by the American Civil War. In August 1861, President Lincoln issued a proclamation prohibiting any "commercial intercourse" with persons in the rebellious states, and no exception was made for insurance contracts. As a result, it became illegal to accept renewal premiums on existing policies in those states and this, in turn, caused large reductions in income for Northern-based companies that had significant pre-war operations in the South. The International was one of those companies. In his report for 1863 (issued in March 1864), New York's Superintendent of Insurance noted that the International had issued hardly any new policies since he had ordered a stop to the repatriation of funds to London. He also estimated that the number of policies remaining in-force was only about one-third of what it had been two years earlier. He attributed this decline to both the effects of the war and a general public concern about the company's solvency. Within a year of writing that, the Superintendent did revoke the International's license to issue new policies.

The International had respectable and wealthy names in its board and among its officers and founders; it did not lack scientific and actuarial ability of a high order; its average mortality did not reach its average expectation. Its business was large and lucrative. What elements of success were then lacking by which its officers are disgraced, its policyholders disappointed, and the fame of an English insurance corporation tarnished, and British credit destroyed in the minds of hundreds of innocent sufferers in this country? — The Society did not maintain a reserve equal to the net value of its policies, and the great lever of compound interest had not a sufficient fulcrum on which to exert its wonderful power; the officers received percentages on the profits, the agents received excessive commissions and heavy traveling and other expenses, the directors and agents borrowed the funds on mere personal securities; safe investments at low rates of interest were eschewed and speculative mining and other stocks purchased:—the legitimate results followed as inevitably as the action of the law of gravitation.

— William Barnes (New York Superintendent of Insurance)

At a general meeting a few years later (in May 1868), the company's shareholders voted to dissolve the International. Two months later (in July 1868), the company entered into a transfer agreement with the Hercules Insurance Company. Under that agreement, the Hercules would take over all of the International's in-force policies in exchange for a payment from the International of £150,000. At the time, the company possessed only about £100,000 and it sought to cover the shortfall by calling up more capital from the shareholders. At this point, litigation commenced. A petition was filed in the Court of Chancery by one of the company's shareholders, asserting that the transfer agreement was "not justified" and asking that the company's dissolution be supervised by the court. In February 1869, the Chancery Court granted that petition. By then, the Hercules had also petitioned for its own dissolution and the Chancery judge, Richard Malins, brought that case under his supervision, as well.

During the hearings that led up to the court-supervised dissolution, several facts were elicited from testimony. Under the International's deed of settlement, a dissolution was required when certain negative financial conditions were met. But although those conditions had existed since 1865, no notice of that fact had been given to the shareholders and no testimony was given as to why the directors waited three years before taking action. Testimony also revealed that, although the transfer agreement with the Hercules was not consummated until July 1868, it had been negotiated prior to the May 1868 shareholders meeting that authorized a transfer. This fact, too, had been kept from the shareholders. The court found this relevant because the International's deed of settlement required that a transfer be made only to a company that was "well established and responsible", and both the petitioner and the court had reservations as to whether the Hercules met this description. Furthermore, the International's investigation of the Hercules's financial condition was limited solely to asking its senior officer whether his company was in a sound financial position (and the officer said that it was). Concerns also were raised about monies being paid to two individuals. The person who brokered the transfer was paid £8,000 for work that the Chancery judge felt was worth no more than £600. In addition, a director of the International was paid £15,000 in connection with the transfer. The Chancery court described these two payments as "fraught with great suspicion".

Before it petitioned for its own dissolution, the Hercules had entered into negotiations with another insurer, seeking to transfer its business to the other insurer. That insurance company was the British Prudential Life Assurance Society (not to be confused with the United States company of similar name). The court-appointed liquidator for the Hercules and the International (in both cases, Frederick Maynard) continued these negotiations and brought them to a successful conclusion in January 1870. However, the Prudential estimated the amount of funds needed to support the International's policies at about £330,000 (i.e., roughly twice what the Hercules had been willing to accept for those same policies). Because the companies did not have this amount of assets on hand, the Prudential agreed to accept payment in five annual installments, but only on condition that all benefit amounts to be paid under the policies be reduced to half the contracted amounts. The benefits payable would increase over time, eventually to the full contracted amounts, when and as the future annual installments were made. The funds needed for the additional payments were to come from the International's shareholders via additional calls for capital. Within two years, the entire capital of £20 per share had been called up, but not all of the shareholders made prompt payment on those calls. It took almost ten years for the full amounts to be paid, during which time the International remained under the control of the liquidator. A final accounting was reported in mid 1880.

Policyholders in the United States fared better than did those in other countries. Legal action in New York placed the International's U.S.-located assets under the control of Thomas J. Creamer, a court-appointed receiver. Creamer then facilitated negotiations between the Prudential and the New York-based Empire Mutual Life Insurance Company. In exchange for the assets already held by New York, plus an additional £25,000 to be paid by the Prudential, the Empire took over all of the International's U.S. policies, without reduction in the contracted amounts.

== Equitable Fire Insurance Company ==
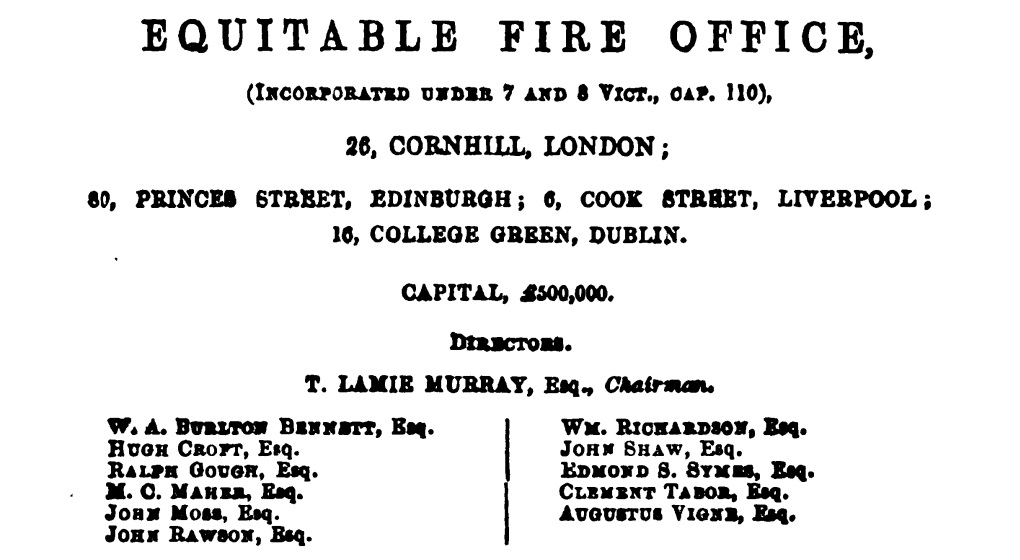
Excerpt of an advertisement published in the 1851 edition of the Farmer's Almanac and Calendar

Although the Equitable Fire Insurance Company was not a subsidiary of the National Loan, the two companies were related. Both were stock companies owned by a large number of investors, and ownership might have been shared by the same investors. But regardless of whether or not there were common owners, there were five individuals who were directors of both companies and one of them was T. Lamie Murray (who also was chairman of both boards of directors). The two companies appeared together in the same advertisements and initially shared the same address in London. Management of Equitable Fire acknowledged that their company had been "brought out under the powerful auspices" of the National Loan.

Equitable Fire was established in June 1849, but did not commence operations until mid 1850. It was registered under the Joint Stock Companies Act 1844 and, as such, was required to file financial statements with Britain's Board of Trade. Those reports were published by the House of Commons. They show that, although Equitable Fire had been advertising its possession of £500,000 capital, the actual amount of paid-in capital was far lower. At the end of 1851, actual paid-in capital amounted to only £15,000. Furthermore, about one-third of that initial capital had been loaned to Murray. In the financial report for that period, the company's auditors noted the existence of the loan and commented that they "would not be supposed to express any opinion in favour of [it]". They added that the matter "may require further investigation by the directors". However, by the time that report was finalized in August 1852, Murray and four other directors had already been removed from their positions (and this was at about the same time that Murray resigned as chairman and director of the National Loan). When announcing the departure, the ongoing management said only that there had been a "complete reorganization" of the board of directors.

Under its new management, Equitable Fire ceased sharing an office with the National Loan and was no longer mentioned in advertisements placed by the National Loan. But because its overseas agents had all been associated with the National Loan, its expansion into Canada and the United States followed the same geographic routes, with major offices in New York, Halifax and Montreal. In the case of Montreal, this was unfortunate because it found the company growing its business there just in time to be affected by that city's Great Fire of 1852. Although the company stated that it was not unduly affected by the Great Fire, it nonetheless called for additional funds from its shareholders that same year. Equitable Fire's operations did stabilize by the mid 1850s, but only to then see a substantial decline in new business. It did not recover from that decline.

Equitable Fire filed for liquidation in London's Court of Chancery in March 1860. Throughout its ten years of existence, the Equitable's owners had paid in about £75,000 in capital. At the time of that filing, the company's assets were only about one-third of that amount. The early loan to Murray had never been repaid.

== Legal cases ==
- Molton v. Camroux. In August 1843, Thomas Lee purchased two annuity contracts from the National Loan. The first was an immediate annuity, costing £350 and under which annual payments to Lee would commence precisely one year after the purchase. The second was a deferred annuity, scheduled to commence when Lee turned age 60 (some twenty-one years into the future). Less than a month after the purchase, Lee was committed to an insane asylum. His guardians sent a letter to the National Loan advising them of the fact and demanding a return of the amounts paid by him, but the Society refused to do so. Lee died the next year. The administrators of his estate brought suit against the National Loan, naming F. Ferguson Camroux, the company's corporate secretary, as the defendant. At trial in December 1846, the jury found that (i) Lee was of unsound mind at the time he entered into the contracts but (ii) the National Loan was not aware of that fact and that the contracts were bona fide transactions conducted in the normal course of the company's business. Based on the first finding, the court ruled in favor of the plaintiffs.

The National Loan appealed to the Exchequer of Pleas. In June 1848, that court overruled the lower court, finding that there was no justification for undoing a fair transaction with a person of unsound mind unless it was proven that the other party was aware of the unsoundness and took advantage of it. In reaching its finding, the Pleas court partly relied on the fact that, although Lee had been committed to an asylum on the basis of a medical certification, there had been no judicial commission of lunacy. The plaintiffs then appealed to the Exchequer Chamber, but that court affirmed the Pleas court in May 1849.

Writing more than half a century later, English jurist Frederick Pollock described Molton v. Camroux as "the principal authority" on the question of how contract law is applied in cases of insanity, adding that it was "the only modern one of much importance". Similarly, a 1921 article by W.G.H Cook in the Columbia Law Review described it as creating "to a large extent" the modern-day principles for deciding such cases. As recently as 2013, it was cited by the Supreme Court of New South Wales.

- Valton v. National Loan. In 1850, an Albany-based agent for the National Loan's American branch sold a policy on the life of Conrad Schumacher. The policy's beneficiaries were Daniel Martin and Gerhart Valton, two German ex-patriates who had recently opened a liquor shop in Albany. Although Schumacher was present when the policy was issued, the initial premium payment was made by Martin on behalf of Schumacher. During that meeting with the insurance agent, Martin asserted that Schumacher (also a German ex-patriate) was an expert in the liquor trade and was "the moneyed man" in the shop's operations. He also ascribed to Schumacher's "eccentricity" the fact that he (Schumacher) had been seen sweeping the street in front of the shop and doing other manual labor. One month after the policy was issued, Schumacher left Albany to live in New York City and, a few months later, disappeared while fishing in the Hudson River with Charles Oltman (another German ex-patriate who was hired by Martin and Valton after Schumacher left Albany). Three days after the disappearance, a body was found off the shore of nearby Jersey City. Although the body had undergone substantial decomposition and devouring by fish, Oltman and Martin were able to identify it as Schumacher's based on an unusual handkerchief that Schumacher had been wearing the last time he was seen.

The National Loan resisted paying the claim, their defense being partly based on an allegation of misrepresentation on the part of Martin (i.e., that Schumacher had not really been the shop's "moneyed man" and, hence, Martin and Valton had no insurable interest in Schumacher's life). But they also argued, on forensic grounds, that the body found could not possibly have been Schumacher's and, hence, there was no proof that Schumacher was actually dead. At trial, the National Loan elicited testimony from four medical experts, including three with the New York Coroner's Office, that bodies drowned in the Hudson River do not wash ashore until at least six or seven days after drowning and that it would have taken at least that long for the body to have taken on its decomposed and devoured condition. But the plaintiffs brought in the testimony of five coroners (three from Albany) who testified that, although not common, it was possible for these conditions to arise in the three days between Schumacher's disappearance and the discovery of the body. The jury found for the plaintiffs, but there were appeals and the case was finally decided by the New York Supreme Court in December 1854, which upheld the original finding.

The American Journal of the Medical Sciences took notice of the case and discussed the forensic testimony at length in its July 1853 issue. The discussion was accompanied by a suggestion that medical practitioners begin assembling statistics on the question of how long it takes for a drowned body to float, and whether there are any circumstances under which the process is either accelerated or delayed.

- Robinson v. International Life. The United States branch of the International issued a policy on the life of Cunningham P. McMurdo in 1845. McMurdo was a resident of Virginia and secured his policy through the International's agent in Richmond. Premiums were duly paid through June 1861. After Lincoln's August proclamation forbidding "commercial intercourse" with the South, McMurdo continued to pay his renewal premiums to the Richmond agent, but did so using Confederate currency. McMurdo died in October 1862. The right to claim payment was assigned to plaintiff Robinson. The International resisted paying the claim and, when taken to court by the plaintiff (date and venue not known), it argued that the Richmond agent was not authorized to collect any premiums from McMurdo after June 1861. This argument was based on the International's normal business arrangement with its agents. Under that arrangement, the New York office authorized the collection of renewal premiums by first sending the agent a "renewal receipt", which would be turned over to the insured at the time of the premium payment. When hostilities began, it ceased sending these receipts to its agents in the Southern states. Therefore, argued the International, the Richmond agent was not authorized to collect the payments from McMurdo. But the Richmond agent testified that he had received verbal authorization to accept renewal premiums without those receipts. The jury accepted the agent's testimony and, on that basis, the court ruled in favor of plaintiff Robinson.

The ruling was appealed, first to the New York Supreme Court and then to the state's court of last resort, the New York Court of Appeals. In both these appeals, the International repeated its argument that the Richmond agent was not authorized to accept renewal premiums. It also repeated other arguments made at the original trial, namely (i) that Confederate currency was worthless in New York and that payments in that currency could not truly be considered "payments" and (ii) that, because New York and Virginia were on opposite sides in the war, Lincoln's proclamation forbidding "commercial intercourse" between the North and the South rendered the contract void (or, at least, suspended). Both of the appeals courts upheld the original trial verdict and each did so with a written ruling that addressed the International's various arguments. In the Appeals ruling, the court noted that, despite running its United States business through its New York-based agents, the International was nonetheless a British corporation and, as such, was not affected by Lincoln's proclamation. As for the payments made in Confederate currency, the court was not convinced that the currency was worthless at the time the payments were made. But it also noted that, if there were any issues arising from the agent's failure to remit funds that could be used in New York, it was a matter between the International and the agent, and not the insured. Finally, the court noted that nothing in the International's contract forbade the issuance of verbal authorizations. The jury at the original trial had accepted the agent's testimony and the Appeals court was unwilling to overturn that decision.

The case has been cited by legal scholars in their discussions of how the law of agency is applied in times of war. It is cited in the 1884 edition of Commentaries on American Law and in George Grafton Wilson's entry on "War" in the Cyclopedia of Law and Procedure (1912). It has also been cited in many other books.

== Bibliography ==
- Barnes, William (1873). "New York Insurance Reports (Condensed Edition): Volume II (Years 1853-1863)". Insurance Reports. Albany: Weed, Parsons. (herein, Volume II of the New York Insurance Reports)
- Barnes, William (1899). "New York Insurance Reports (Condensed Edition): Volume III (Years 1864-1870)". Insurance Reports. Albany: J.B. Lyon. (herein, Volume III of the New York Insurance Reports)
- House of Commons (1856). "Equitable Fire Insurance Company". Assurance Companies: Return to an Order of the Honourable The House of Commons. [H. Of C. Reports and papers 1856] ;178. London. pp. 176–178. (herein, Parliamentary Paper No. 178)
- House of Commons (1863). "Equitable Fire Insurance Company". Assurance Companies: Return to an Order of the Honourable The House of Commons. [Parl. H. Of C. Reports and papers. 1863] ;310. London. pp. 112–116. (herein, Parliamentary Paper No. 310)
- National Loan Fund Life Assurance Society (1840). National Loan Fund, Life Assurance, and Deferred Annuity Society. CIHM/ICMH Microfiche; no. 63424. London: self-published. ISBN 9780665634246. (herein, the Halifax Brochure)
- Stalson, J. Owen (1942). Marketing Life Insurance: Its History in America. Harvard studies in business history,6. Cambridge (Massachusetts): Harvard University Press. (herein, Marketing Life Insurance)
- Wright, Elizur; Sargent, George (1865). Massachusetts Reports on Life Insurance: 1859-1865. Boston: Wright & Potter. (herein, the Massachusetts Insurance Reports).
