= Ruth Abrahams =

British artist (1931-2000)

- Born: 11 March 1931; Stepney, London
- Died: 8 August 2000 (aged 69)
- Education: St Martin's School of Art; Royal Academy Schools
- Known for: Painter

Ruth Abrahams (11 March 1931 – 8 August 2000) was a British artist.

== Biography ==
Abrahams was born in Stepney in London. She studied art at St Martin's School of Art from 1951 until 1955 when she enrolled in the Royal Academy Schools from where she graduated in 1959. During her time at the Royal Academy Schools Abrahams won a number of prizes including a Leverhulme Award, the Landseer Medal for Drawing and the David Murray Landscape Award. In 1960 she won the Harrogate Festival Painting Prize to attend the British School in Rome. Abrahams taught part-time at several art colleges including St Martins, Derby Lonsdale College, Loughborough College of Art and also at Trent Polytechnic. She also exhibited in a number of group shows. These included exhibitions at the Royal Academy and with the London Group. Durham University holds examples of her work.
