= Emanuel M. Abrahams =

American businessman and politician

Member of the Chicago City Council from the 20th ward
- In office 1913
- Preceded by: Dennis J. Egan
- Succeeded by: Matt Franz

Member of the Illinois House of Representatives
- In office 1907–1911

Personal details
- Died: 1913 (age 46) Chicago, Illinois
- Party: Democratic

Emanuel M. Abrahams (July 7, 1866 – July 1, 1913) was an American businessman and politician.

Abrahams was born in Chicago, Illinois and was a member of the Jewish religion. He was a merchant in Chicago. Abrahams served in the Illinois House of Representatives from 1907 to 1911 and was a Democrat. He then served on the Chicago City Council beginning in 1913, until his death later that year. Abrahams died at a hospital in Chicago, Illinois at age 46 after suffering a stroke at the Chicago City Hall.

After his death, his brother, Morris Abrahams, ran with the backing of Mayor Carter Harrison IV to fill the incomplete City Hall term of his Abrahams. Morris Abrahams was a leader of the William Randolph Hearst–Harrison elements in the twentieth ward. However, prior to the Democratic Party's primary election, Morris Abrahams was indicted for electoral fraud stemming from the November 1912 elections. He was defeated in the Democratic Party's primary election by Matt Franz 1,995 to 1,677.
