= Abrams P-1 Explorer =

1937 aerial photography aircraft

P-1 Explorer
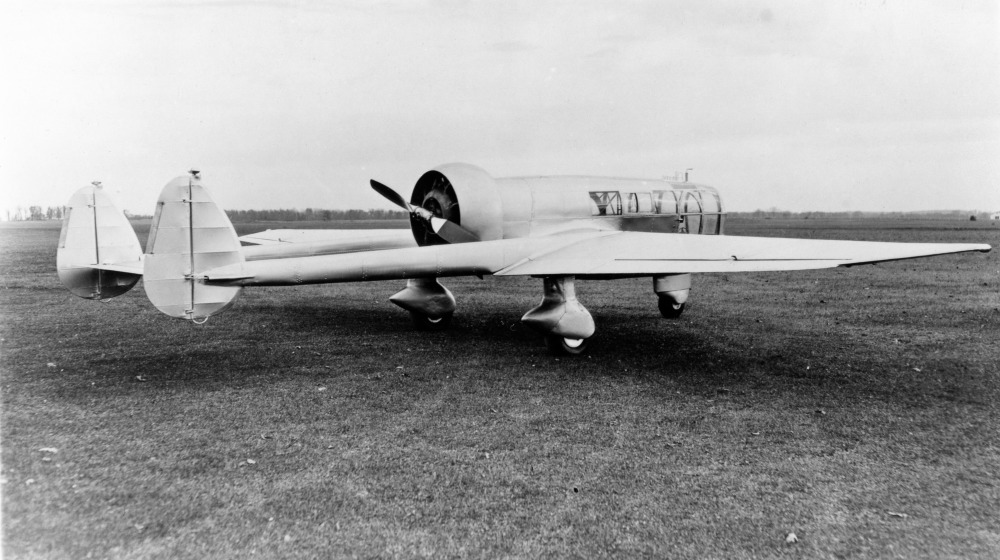

General information
- Type: aerial photography and survey aircraft
- National origin: United States
- Manufacturer: Abrams Aircraft Corporation
- Designer: Talbert Abrams
- Number built: 1

History
- First flight: November 1937

The Abrams P-1 Explorer is an American purpose-designed aerial photography and survey aircraft that first flew in November 1937.

== Design and development ==
The Explorer was designed by aerial survey pioneer Talbert Abrams to provide a stable platform with excellent visibility for aerial photography and surveying. Abrams was an early aerial photographer in World War I. After the war, he purchased a Curtiss JN-4 Jenny and founded the ABC Airline (“Always Be Careful”). In 1923, Abrams founded the Abrams Aerial Survey Corporation and in 1937, Abrams Aircraft Corporation to build the specialized P-1 aircraft.

Standard single-engine, front-engined airplanes of this era had many drawbacks for scientific photography. They were designed to be maneuverable rather than to serve as stable photographic platforms. Oil leaking from the engines could contaminate the camera lens, interfering with aerial photography. Finally, engine noise made communication between crew members difficult.

Abrams designed an aircraft with a rear engine to keep the camera apertures clean and reduce cockpit noise, and used a delta type wing to facilitate side vision. He hired engineers Kenneth Ronan and Andrew Edward Kunzl, in Marshall, Michigan, who drew plans and began construction in the former Page Brothers Buggy Company factory.

Ronan and Kunzl operated an aeronautical repair station at the Marshall airfield. Planning and construction took ten months, and resulted in an airplane designed for more efficient and economical aerial photography.

To create the clear nose so the pilot had an unobstructed view, Abrams hired the German company Rohm and Haas, creators of Plexiglas. With a wooden model of each window pane, the Plexiglas was clamped in a frame similar to a window frame. Heated until it began to sag, it was then pushed down by two workers holding the frame until it was molded to the wooden model.

The Plexiglas could then be trimmed and mounted in the frame work. When the Explorer came back for restoration, the panels which had been heated were as clear as when new, though were destroyed due to abuse during disassembly.

The Explorer was a low-wing aluminium monoplane with twin booms and a central nacelle for the pilot and camera equipment. The pod's nose section was extensively glazed in Plexiglas. The undercarriage was fixed and of tricycle configuration.

Originally powered with a 330 hp (250 kW) engine and a two-bladed propeller, it was sent back to Ronan & Kunzul to increase the horsepower to 450. This change required braces to be added from the wing top to the fuselage and they added a three-bladed propeller, with Abrams hoping the increased power would attract a buyer.

World War II interrupted Abrams's work, and the single aircraft built was put into storage for the duration of the war. Obsolete by the end of the conflict, it was donated to the US National Air and Space Museum in 1948, where it remains today awaiting restoration.

== Variants ==
- P-1: the initial design and prototype.
- PC-4: Abrams planned a pressurized version of the P-1, named the PC-4 that did not go into production.

== Operational history ==
The P-1 was flown with a variety of camera gear. The Abrams Instrument Corporation C-3 camera was used to produce 650 nine by nine inch photos per flight.

== Restoration attempt ==
In 1968, a group of aviation enthusiasts began a project to restore the Explorer, including Jim Linn, who worked at Abrams Aerial Survey, Ron Dietz, a student pilot and engineer at Oldsmobile Division of General Motors, and Ellis Hammond, President of the Michigan Aerospace Educational Association. They worked with Don Lopez, the Assistant Director of the Smithsonian's National Air and Space Museum to release the aircraft, and in January 1975 the Explorer was transported in a Michigan National Guard Lockheed C-130 Hercules to the Capital City Airport in Lansing, Michigan.

The aircraft was moved to a state-owned hangar, where Dietz carried out careful photography before any disassembly was done, as well as detailed tracings of all the lettering so it could be recreated accurately at the end of the project.

The wings were sent to Montcalm Community College, where they were stripped, cleaned, repainted and recovered with silver painted fabric. The instruments panels and controls were disassembled and restored by Dietz's colleagues at Oldsmobile.

The aircraft was physically moved to the Lansing Community College aviation program. However, the restoration attempt was never completed; in 1981, the Lansing Community College truck driving school returned the plane to the Paul E. Garber Preservation, Restoration, and Storage Facility of the Smithsonian, where it remains.

== Specifications ==
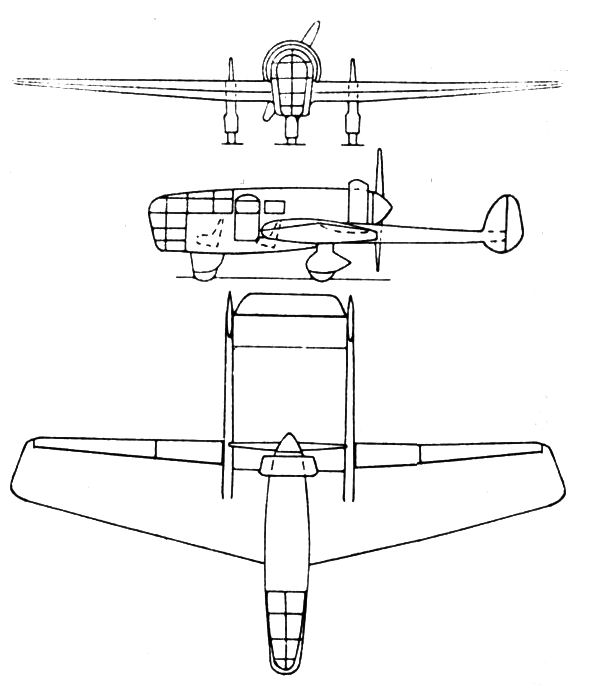
Abrams Explorer 3-view drawing from L'Aerophile March 1938

Data from Jane's all the World's Aircraft 1938

General characteristics

- Crew: 2
- Length: 26 ft 6 in (8.08 m)
- Wingspan: 36 ft 8 in (11.18 m)
- Height: 6 ft 4 in (1.93 m)
- Wing area: 200 sq ft (19 m^{2})
- Aspect ratio: 6.58
- Airfoil: root: NACA 23018; tip: NACA 23009
- Empty weight: 2,100 lb (953 kg)
- Gross weight: 3,400 lb (1,542 kg)
- Powerplant: 1 × Wright R-975E-1 Whirlwind 9-cylinder air-cooled radial piston engine, 365 hp (272 kW)
- Propellers: 2-bladed Hamilton-Standard variable-pitch pusher propeller

Performance

- Maximum speed: 200 mph (320 km/h, 170 kn) at 10,000 ft (3,000 m)
- Cruise speed: 175 mph (282 km/h, 152 kn) at 10,000 ft (3,000 m)
- Landing speed: 60 mph (52 kn; 97 km/h) with flaps extended
- Range: 1,200 mi (1,900 km, 1,000 nmi)
- Service ceiling: 20,000 ft (6,100 m)
- Rate of climb: 1,400 ft/min (7.1 m/s)
- Wing loading: 17 lb/sq ft (83 kg/m^{2})
- Power/mass: 9.3 lb/hp (5.7 kg/kW)

== See also ==
- Edgley Optica
- Seabird Seeker

Related lists

- List of pusher aircraft by configuration
- Twin-boom aircraft
