= Bram =

Bram may refer to:

== People and fictional characters ==
- Bram (surname), a list of people
- Bram (given name), including a list of people and fictional characters
- Bram, a ring name of Thom Latimer (born 1986), English professional wrestler
- Bramwell "Bram" Morrison, a former member of Sharon, Lois & Bram, a Canadian children's music group

== Places in France ==
- Bram, Aude, a commune in Occitanie
  - Gare de Bram, a railway station
- Stade du Bram, Louhans, Saône-et-Loire

== Other uses ==
- Storm Bram, a 2025 weather event over the British Isles
- Bram v. United States, an 1897 United States Supreme Court case
- Bram (wolf), a wolf in the Netherlands

== See also ==
- Brahm (disambiguation)
- BRAAAM (spelled variously), a sound in movie trailers
- Brams, a surname
- CBRAM, conductive-bridging RAM
