= Brahma (disambiguation) =

Brahma is the Hindu creator god.

Brahma may also refer to:

- Brahmā (Buddhism), a Buddhist god, a being of the non-sensual world

== Arts and entertainment ==
- "Brahma" (poem), a poem by Ralph Waldo Emerson
- Brahma (1994 film), an Indian Bollywood film
- Brahma (2014 film), an Indian historical drama film
- Brahma Dutt, a fictional character in the 2022 Indian film The Kashmir Files
- Brahma (album), a 1980 album by the Barry Altschul Trio

== People ==
- Brahma (surname), including a list of people
- Brahma (given name), a list of people

== Animals ==
- Brahman (cattle), a breed of cattle also known as Brahma
- Brahma (chicken), a breed of chicken

== Other uses ==
- Operation Brahma, a disaster relief and rescue operation undertaken by the Indian government in response to the 2025 Myanmar earthquake
- Brahma Peak, Washington state, United States
- Brahma (protein complex), a protein
- Brahma beer, a Brazilian beer
- Bar Brahma, a bar in São Paulo, Brazil
- Fort Worth Brahmas, a former professional ice hockey team
- San Antonio Brahmas, a former professional American football team

== See also ==
- Brahma Sarovar (English: Brahma's lake), a man-made water tank in Kurukshetra, Haryana, India
- Brahma Vav, a stepwell in Khedbrahma, Gujarat, India
- Brahm (disambiguation)
- Brahman (disambiguation)
- Brahmin (disambiguation)
