= Brahmi (disambiguation) =

Brahmi may refer to:

== Writing systems ==
- Brahmi script, a script used in ancient India
  - Brahmi numerals, numerals in Brahmi, basis of the later Hindu–Arabic numeral system
- Brahmic scripts, scripts derived from Brahmi

== Plants ==
- Bacopa monnieri
- Centella asiatica (in North India)

== People ==
- Azzedine Brahmi (born 1966), Algerian long-distance runner
- Brahmanandam ("Brahmi", born 1956), Telugu comedian
- Maroua Brahmi, Tunisian athlete
- Mohamed Brahmi (1955–2013), Tunisian politician
- Said Brahmi (born 1995), Qatari footballer
- Tarik Brahmi (born 1968), Canadian engineer and politician

== Other ==
- Brahmani (Matrika), also known as Brahmi, one of the seven mother goddesses called Matrikas and consort or Shakti (power) of Hindu creator god Brahma
- Brahmi (Unicode block)

== See also ==
- Brahmani (disambiguation)
- Brahmin (disambiguation)
