= Brahma Kumar =

Brahma Kumar may refer to these in Hinduism:

- A child (kumar) of the deity Brahma
- A male member of the Brahma Kumaris
- A male follower of the Adhyatmik Ishwariya Vishwa Vidyalaya, also known as Prajapita Brahma Kumaris

== See also ==
- Brahma (disambiguation)
- Kumar (disambiguation)
