= Brahms (disambiguation) =

Johannes Brahms (1833–1897) was a German composer and pianist.

Brahms may also refer to:

- Brahms (surname), a list of notable people with the surname
- Brahms (crater), a crater on Mercury
- 1818 Brahms, main-belt asteroid
- Brahms, 2015 French graphic novel by Jul Maroh
- Brahms: The Boy II, a 2020 horror film

== See also ==
- Brahm (disambiguation)
- Brahman (disambiguation)
- Abrams (disambiguation)
- Braum's, a chain of fast-food restaurants and grocery stores
