= Pancharatha =

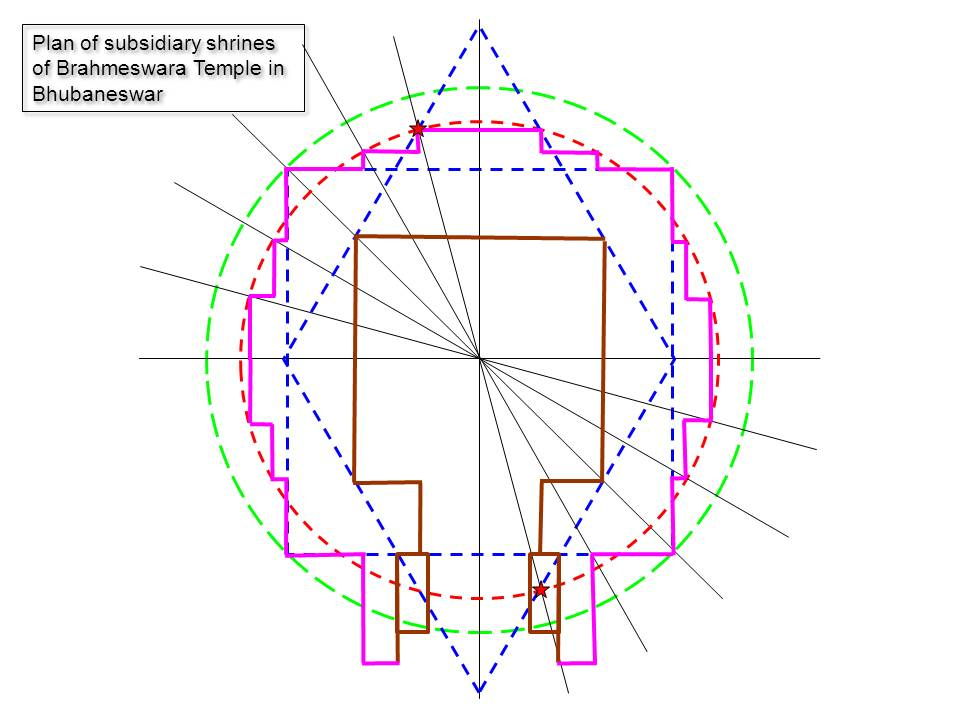
Drawing of a pancharatha building

A Hindu temple is a pancharatha (Sanskrit: पञ्चरथ, IAST: pañcaratha) when there are five ratha (on plan) or paga (on elevation) on the tower of the temple (generally a shikhara). The rathas are vertical offset projection or facets. The name comes from the sanskrit Pancha (=five) and Ratha (=chariot), but the link with the concept of chariot is not clear.

There are also temples with three rathas (triratha), seven rathas (saptaratha) and nine rathas (navaratha).

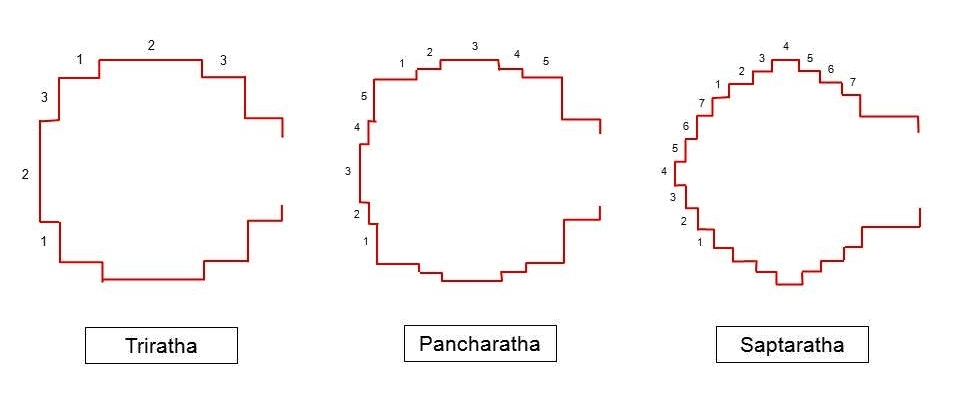
Triratha, Pancharatha and Saptaratha

== Examples of pancharatha temples ==
- Lingaraja Temple in Bhubaneswar
- Lakshmana Temple in Khajuraho
- Rajarani Temple in Bhubaneswar
- Jagannath Temple in Puri, Odisha
- Jagannath Temple in Baripada, Odisha
- Jagannath Temple in Nayagarh, Odisha
- Isanesvara Siva Temple in Bhubaneswar
- Mukteswar Temple in Bhubaneswar
- Brahmani temple in Baleswar, Odisha
Pancharatha temples
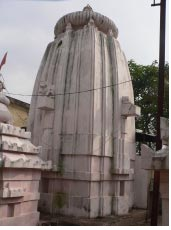
Isanesvara Siva Temple in Bhubaneswar

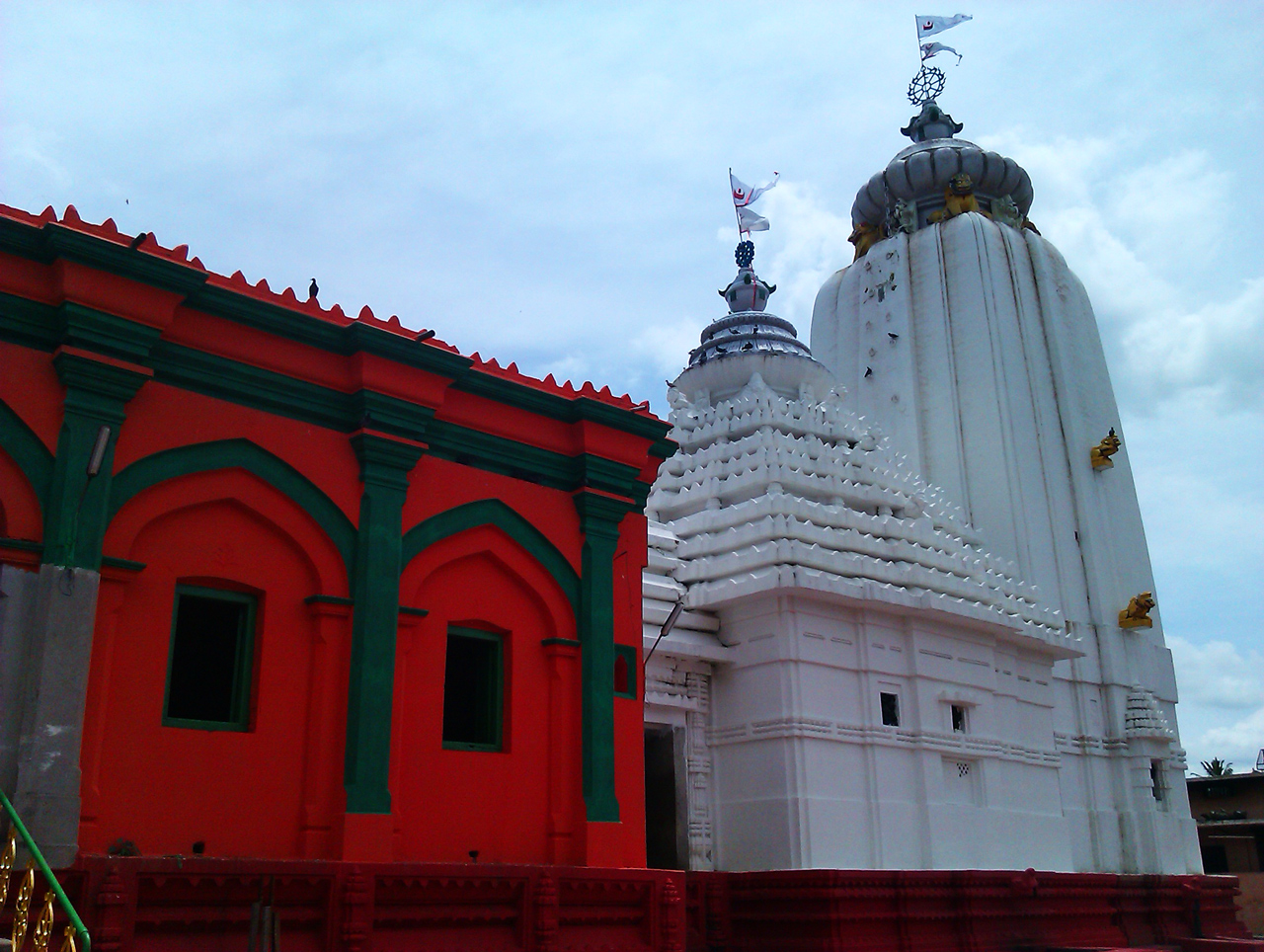
Jagannath Temple in Baripada

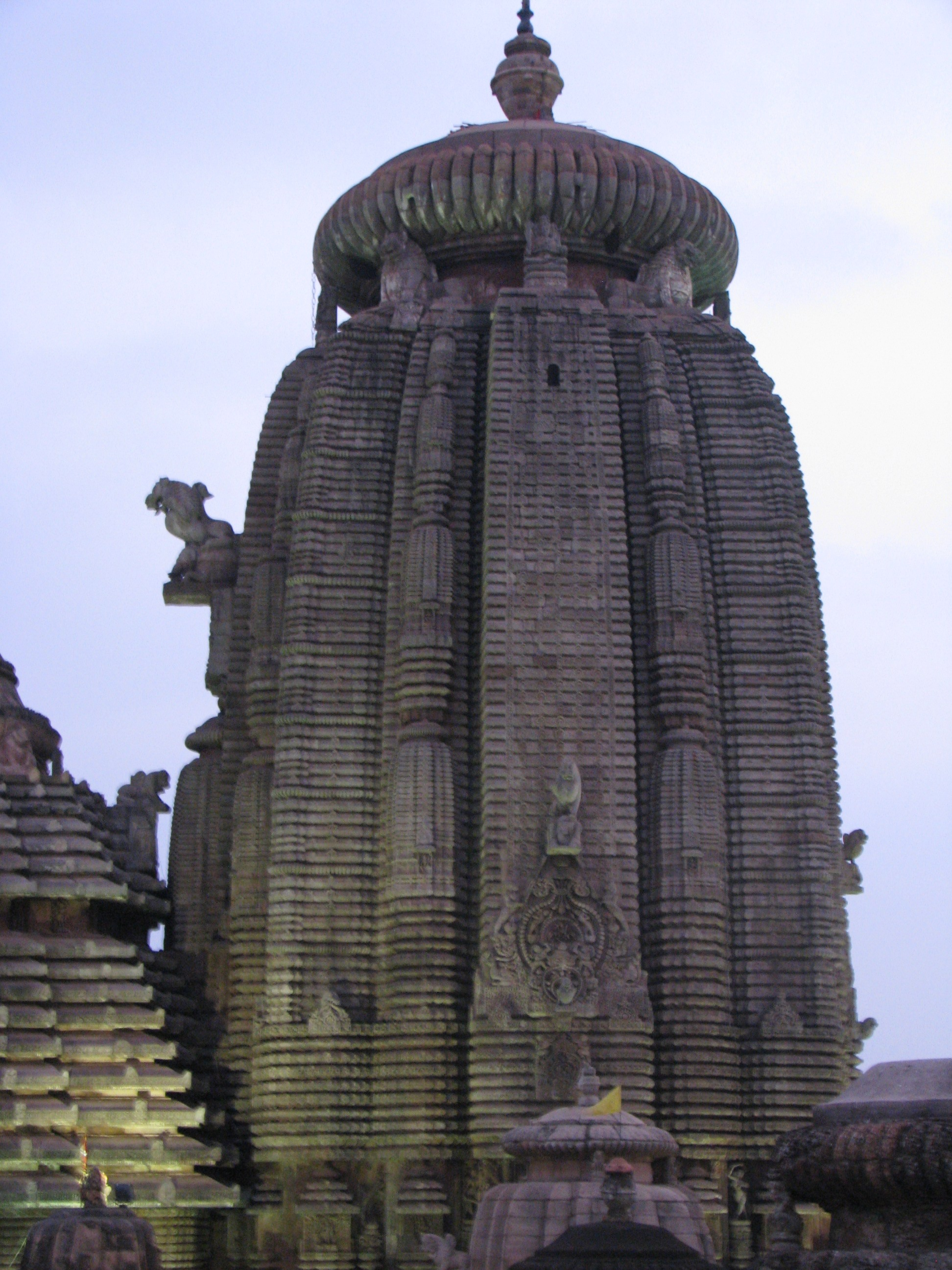
Lingaraja Temple in Bhubaneswar

== See also ==
- Ratha (architecture)
