= Moti Dau =

- Village
- Syamaranu Deru from west, doorframe depicting Navagraha
- Interactive map of Moti Dau
- Coordinates: 23.682474°N 72.398443°E
- Country: India
- State: Gujarat
- District: Mehsana

Languages
  - Official: Gujarati, Hindi
- Time zone: UTC+5:30 (IST)
- Vehicle registration: GJ-2
- Nearest city: Mehsana

Moti Dau is a village in Mehsana Taluka of Mehsana district, Gujarat, India.

== History ==
The Bhavaneshwar Mahadev temple was built in Vikram Samvat 1565 (1509 CE) as per the inscription. It has several marble sculptures of Matrikas including Maheshwari, Brahmani and Varahi.

Syamaranu Deru is a small damaged shrine. The outer walls of the temple feature intricate carvings, including panel depictions of Hindu deities such as Brahma, Shiva, Varuna, Indra, and Chandra. The doorframe of the shrine has a Navagraha panel. The shikhara of the shrine no longer survives. The shrine was probably built in 16th century.

== Gallery ==
Lake near village

Canal near village

Syamaranu Deru from south

Syamaranu Deru from north

Syamaranu Deru from northeast
