= Brahm (surname) =

Brahm is a surname of multiple origins. Notable people with the name include:

== German surname ==
- Charles Brahm (1917–2003), Belgian canoeist
- Chandan Brahm, Indian politician
- Dragutin Brahm, Croatian mountain climber
- Ferdinand de Brahm, German-born American military engineer
- Jake Brahm, grocery store clerk and blogger
- John Brahm (1893–1982), German-born American film and television director
- John William Gerard de Brahm (1718 – c. 1799), German cartographer, engineer and mystic
- Nikolaus Joseph Brahm (1751 – c. 1812), German zoologist
- Otto Brahm (1856–1912), German theatre manager and director
- Terry Brahm (born 1962), American distance runner

== In other cultures ==
- Ajahn Brahm (born 1951), British-Australian Theravada Buddhist monk

== See also ==
- Brahm (disambiguation)
- Brahms (disambiguation)
