= Braum =

- Language: English or Yiddish variant of German surnames

Origin
- Word/name: Brahm or Braun

Braum is a surname. It is an Americanized form of the German surname Brahm, as well as an Ashkenazi Jewish surname which may have originated as a variant of Braun. The 2010 United States census found 250 people with the surname Braum, making it the 76,768th-most-common name in the country. This represented a decrease from 279 (66,274th-most-common) in the 2000 Census. In both censuses, roughly nine-tenths of the bearers of the surname identified as White.

People and fictional characters with the name include:

- Bill Braum, founder of American restaurant chain Braum's
- Bohuslav Braum (born 1956), Czech weightlifter
- Daniel M. Braum, 1966 recipient of the American Society of Industrial Engineers' Gilbreth Medal
- Eduarda Braum (born 2001), Brazilian beauty pageant titleholder
- Braum, the Heart of Freljord, League of Legends character voiced by JB Blanc
