= Brahmani =

Brahmani may refer to:

- Brahmani or Brahmini, a female Brahmin
- A number of Hindu goddesses such as
  - Brahmani (Matrika)
- Rivers:
  - Brahmani River, a river in Odisha, India
  - Brahmani River (Dwarka), a tributary of the Dwarka in Jharkhand and West Bengal, India
- Brahmani, Raebareli, a village in Uttar Pradesh, India
- Brahmani railway station, Odisha, India
- Brahmani Temple, Odisha, India

== See also ==
- Brahman (disambiguation)
- Brahmin (disambiguation)
