= Brams =

Brams is a surname. Notable people with the surname include:

- Steven Brams (born 1940), American game theorist and political scientist
- Ingeborg Brams (1921–1989), Danish film, radio, television, and theatre actress

== See also ==
- Brahms (surname)
- Bram (disambiguation)
