= Brahma (surname) =

Indian Boro language surname

Origin
- Language: Sanskrit
- Meaning: Priest, Absolute
- Region of origin: Assam, India

Brahma is surname used by Boros of Assam. This surname was taken by followers of Brahma religion founded by Kalicharan Brahma.

== Geographical distribution ==
As of 2014, 99.3% of all known bearers of the surname Brahma were residents of India. The frequency of the surname was higher than national average in only one state:

1. Assam (1: 105)

== Notable people ==
- Bineswar Brahma, academic.
- Chandan Brahma, 21st century politician and cabinet minister.
- Harishankar Brahma - 19th Chief Election Commissioner of India.
- Kalicharan Brahma (1860–1938), social reformer.
- Kameshwar Brahma, president of Bodo Sahitya Sabha.
- Madaram Brahma (1903–1990), poet.
- Maneswar Brahma, 21st century politician
- Nirmal Kumar Brahma, 21st century politician.
- Pramila Rani Brahma (born 1951), Bodo politician and social worker.
- Prem Singh Brahma (1952–2007), former leader of Bodo Liberation Tigers Force turned politician.
- Rupnath Brahma (1902–1968), politician.
- Sobha Brahma (1929–2012), painter and sculptor.
- Sukumar Brahma, electrical engineer and professor.
- Upendranath Brahma (1956–1999), social activist.
- Urkhao Gwra Brahma (born 1963), politician and poet.

== Bibliography ==
- Banerjee, Dipankar (2006). Brahmo Samaj and North-East India. Anamika Publishers & Distributors. ISBN 978-81-7975-176-3.
