= Isanesvara Siva Temple =

Temple in India

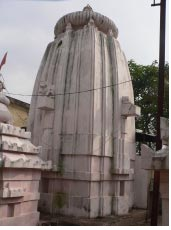

- Location in Orissa

Religion
- Affiliation: Hinduism
- Deity: lord Siva

Location
- Location: Bhubaneswar
- State: Orissa
- Country: India
- Coordinates: 20°15′11″N 85°50′36″E

Architecture
- Type: Kalingan Style (Kalinga Architecture)
- Completed: 13th century A.D.
- Elevation: 20 m (66 ft)

Isanesvara Siva Temple is a 13th-century temple in Bhubaneswar in the state of Orissa, India. The date of its construction is estimated from its architectural features and it is suggests the temple to ganga period. The temple is in the Goasagaresvartemple precinct, on the left side of Ratha road (leading from Mausima Chowk to Badheibanka Chowk) old Town, Bhubaneswar. It is one kilometre (0.62 mi) west of Lingaraja Temple, one km south of Ananta Vasudev, 300 m (980 ft) southwest of Ramesvara temple and 200 m (660 ft) northwest of Baitala Deula. The temple is facing towards east. The presiding deity is only a circular yon pitha. The lingam is missing.

This temple is used for worship. Its cultural, social and historical significances are same as the Gosagaresvara temple. Its associational significance is its usage for public meeting.

== Ownership ==
This temple has multiple ownership and is taken care of by private persons namely Mahendra Garabadu and Bhaga Garabadu. Their residence is at Gosagaresvar Chowk, Old Town, Bhubaneswar.

== Physical description ==
=== Surrounding ===
The temple is surrounded by Paradaresvara temple in the west, Gosagaresvara temple in north-west and minor Siva temple in the south-west, Lingarajaa Mandapa in the northern side, and in the eastern side there is a modern compound and across wall there is a paddy field.

=== Orientation ===
The temple is facing towards east.

=== Plan and elevation ===
On plan, temple is pancharatha having a square vimana with a renovated frontal porch extending towards east. The vimana measures 3 m^{2} (32 sq ft) with the porch of 0.60 m^{2} (6.5 sq ft). On elevation, the vimana is in rekha order with usual bada, gandi and mastaka measures 7.3 metres (24 ft) in height from khura to kalasa. The bada of the vimana has five vertical divisions measuring 2.2 metres (7 ft 3 in) in height pabhaga (0.51 m [1 ft 8 in]), tala jangha (0.45 m [1 ft 6 in]), bandhana (0.22 m [8.7 in], upara jangha (0.46 m [1 ft 6 in]) and the baranda (0.57 m [1 ft 10 in]) in height. The gandi of the vimana above the baranda measuring 3.60 m (11.8 ft) is distinguished by central raha and a pair of anuratha and kanika pagas on either side of the raha. It is curvilinear spire. The mastaka has components like beki, amlaka. khapuri and kalasa that measures 1.5 m (4 ft 11 in) in height.

=== Raha niche & Parsvadevatas ===
The parsvadevata niches on three sides uniformly measuring 0.40 m (1 ft 4 in) in height, 0.28 m (11 in) in width and 0.20 m (7.9 in) in depth are all empty. Beneath the niches is the plain talagarvika while above the niches is in the urdhvagarvika.

=== Decorative feature ===
The base of the gandi above the baranda decorated with a series of miniature rekha deuls surmounted by udyota simha in each raha paga.

Doorjamb: The doorjamb is of recent addition made out of the renovation work and beneath the door frame there are two khakhara-mundi niches are found.

Lintel: The graha architrave is plain due to renovation.

=== Property type ===
The temple has the Rekha deul typology and it is a temple building.

Building material: Coarse grained sandstone.

Construction techniques: Dry masonry.

Style Kalinga architecture

== Grade (A/B/C) ==
i) Architecture: B

ii) Historic: C

iii) Associational:' B

iv) Social/Cultural: B
