= Haridaspur, Odisha =

Haridaspur
- Village
- Location in Odisha, India Haridaspur (India)
- Coordinates: 20°44′0″N 86°7′0″E
- Country: India
- State: Odisha
- District: Jajpur
- Elevation: 122 m (400 ft)

Languages
  - Official: Odia
- Time zone: UTC+5:30 (IST)
- Vehicle registration: OD 04
- Coastline: 0 kilometres (0 mi)
- Nearest city: Cuttack
- Climate: Tropical monsoon (Köppen)
- Avg. summer temperature: 35 °C (95 °F)
- Avg. winter temperature: 20 °C (68 °F)
- Website: odisha.gov.in

Haridaspur is a village in Jajpur district, Odisha, India.

== Geography ==
It is located at an elevation of 122 m above MSL.

== Location ==
National Highway 16 starts from Haridaspur. Haridaspur railway station is situated on the Cuttack-Jajpur route.
