= Brahm =

Brahm may refer to:

- Brahm (surname), a list of people with the surname
- Brahm Bhat, a Hindu caste found in North India
- Brahm Kai Meu (mango), a cultivar of the mango Mangifera indica

== See also ==
- Bram (disambiguation)
- Braham (disambiguation)
- Brahms (disambiguation)
- Brahma (disambiguation)
- Brahman (disambiguation)
- Brahmin (disambiguation)
- Brahmana
