= Bram (surname) =

Bram or Bräm is a surname. Notable people with the surname include:

- Christopher Bram (born 1952), American author
- Leila Bram (1927–1979), American mathematician
- Richard Bram (born 1952), American street photographer
- Thüring Bräm (born 1944), Swiss composer and conductor

== See also ==
- Bram (given name)
