= Bram (given name) =

- Gender: Male

Other names
- Related names: Abraham

Bram is a given name for a male. It is derived from the name Abraham, and common in Dutch-speaking regions. It can also be a short form of Abraham, Abram or Bramwell.

== People ==
- Abraham Bram van de Beek (born 1946), Dutch theologian
- Bram Bogart (1921–2012), Dutch-born Belgian painter
- Bram Cohen (born 1975), American computer programmer
- Bram De Ly (born 1984), Dutch retired footballer
- Abram Bram Fischer (1908–1975), South African anti-apartheid lawyer
- Bramwell Bram Gay (1930–2019), British trumpet player
- Bram Goldsmith (1923–2016), American real estate developer, banker, and philanthropist
- Bram Inscore (1981/1982–2023), American musician, songwriter, and producer
- Bram Moolenaar (1961–2023), Dutch computer programmer
- Bramwell "Bram" Morrison (born 1940), a former member of Canadian children's music group Sharon, Lois & Bram
- Abraham Bram Moszkowicz (born 1960), Dutch disbarred lawyer
- Bram Nuytinck (born 1990), Dutch footballer
- Abraham Bram van Ojik (born 1954), Dutch politician
- Abraham Bram Peper (1940–2022), Dutch sociologist and former politician
- Abraham Bram van der Stok (1915–1993), Dutch World War II flying ace, one of the three successful escapees in the "Great Escape" from a German prisoner-of-war camp
- Abraham Bram Stoker (1847–1912), Irish author, barrister, and theatre manager, author of Dracula
- Bram Van Paesschen (1979–2025), Belgian film director and editor
- Bram Vandenbussche (born 1981), Belgian footballer
- Abraham Bram van Velde (1895–1981), Dutch painter
- Abraham Bram van der Vlugt (1934–2020), Dutch actor

== Fictional characters ==
- Bram Bowman, a main character in the American TV series Colony
- Bram Greenfield, a main character in the novel Simon vs. the Homo Sapiens Agenda, a character in the movie Love, Simon, and a minor character in the spin-off series Love, Victor
- Bram Howard, a character in seasons 6 and 7 of The West Wing
- Bram Shepherd, a protagonist on Bram & Alice, a short-lived 2002 American sitcom
