= Bramwell (name) =

Bramwell is a surname derived from an unidentified hamlet in England, the name of which comes from the Old English for 'broom' or 'bramble well'. The location of the place it referred to is difficult to trace, as the surname is distributed fairly evenly throughout England. In modern times, 'Bramwell' has also been used as a masculine given name, with the short form 'Bram'. A variant form of this name is 'Branwell', and another possible meaning is "raven's well".

== People surnamed Bramwell ==
- Aaron Bramwell (born 1986), Welsh rugby union player
- Sir Byrom Bramwell (1847–1931), British brain surgeon
- Christopher Bramwell (fl. 1977–1996), British television actor
- David Bramwell, British writer, musician, performer and broadcaster
- David Bramwell (botanist) (1942–2022), British botanist
- Edwin Bramwell (1873–1952), Scottish neurologist
- Sir Frederick Bramwell (1818–1903), British civil and mechanical engineer
- George Bramwell, 1st Baron Bramwell (1808–1892), English judge
- Grant Bramwell (born 1961), New Zealand sprint canoeist
- Henry Bramwell (1919–2010), United States federal judge
- John Bramwell (born 1964), English singer and songwriter
- John Bramwell (footballer) (born 1937), English football left back
- John Crighton Bramwell (1889–1976), British cardiologist
- John Milne Bramwell (1852–1925), Scottish physician and surgeon
- Steven T. Bramwell (born 1961), British physicist and chemist

== People with the given name Bramwell ==
- Bramwell Booth (1856–1929), English general of the Salvation Army
- George Bramwell Evens (1884–1943), British radio broadcaster and writer
- Bramwell Fletcher (1904–1988), English stage, film and television actor
- Bramwell Tillsley (1931–2019), Canadian general of the Salvation Army
- Bramwell Tovey (1953–2022), British conductor and composer
