= Shri Shri Hari Baladev Jew Bije, Baripada =

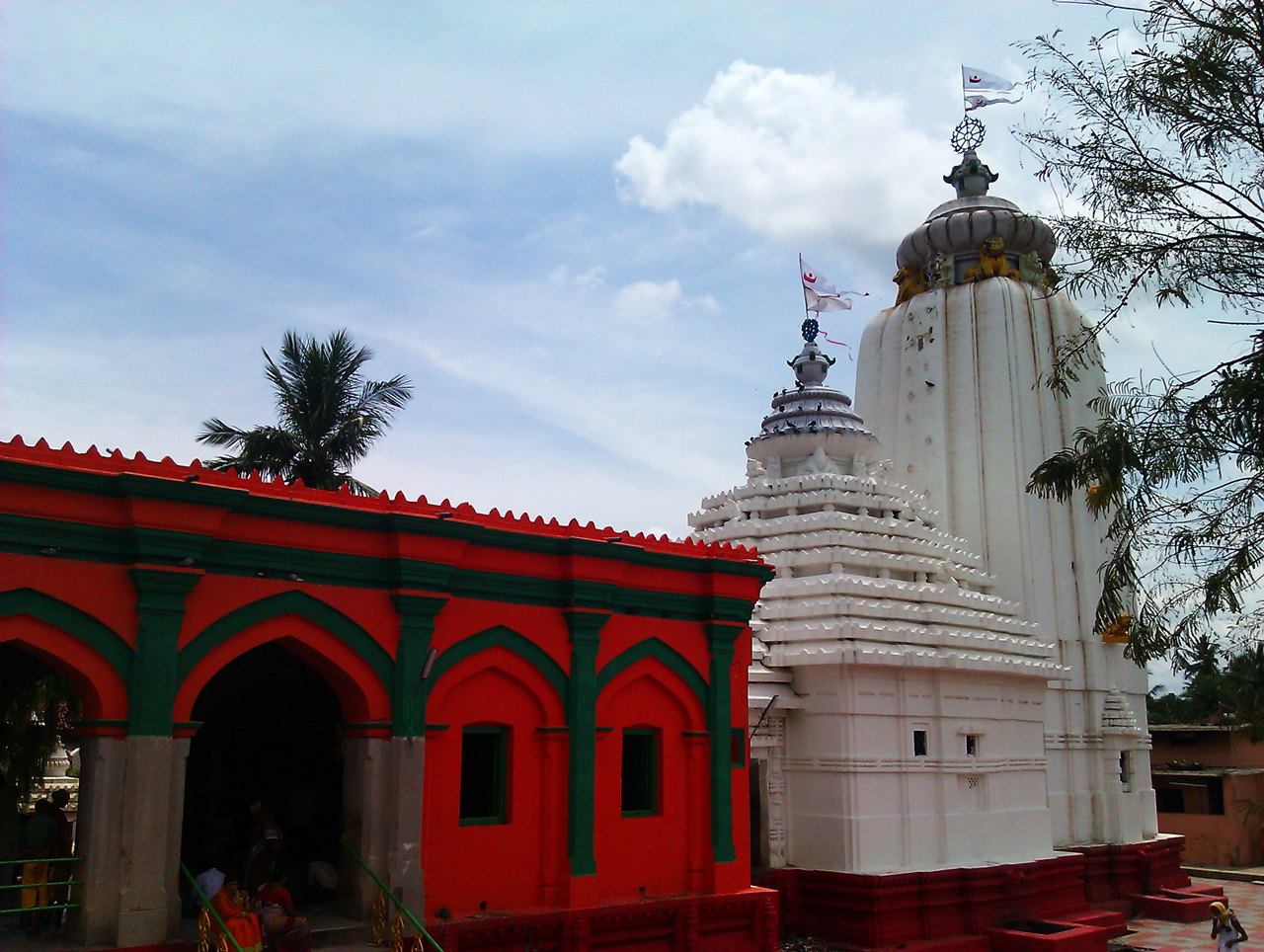
- Shri Shri Hari Baladev Jew Bije temple, Baripada

- Location of the temple Shri Shri Hari Baladev Jew Bije, Baripada (India)

Religion
- Affiliation: Hinduism
- Deity: Lord Jaganath
- Festival: Ratha Yatra

Location
- Location: Mayurbhanj
- State: Odisha
- Country: India
- Coordinates: 21°55′44.98″N 86°43′23.9″E

Architecture
- Type: Kalinga architecture
- Creator: Maharaja Baidyanath Bhanj
- Completed: 1575 CE
- Temple: 1
- Inscriptions: 1

Website
- baripadarathyatra.in

Shri Shri Hari Baladev Jew Bije (Odia: ଶ୍ରୀ ଶ୍ରୀ ହରି ବଳଦେବ ଜୀଉ ବିଜେ) is a Hindu temple of lord Jagannath located in Baripada, Mayurbhanj district, in the state of Odisha, India. The name Jagannath (Lord of the Universe) is a combination of the Sanskrit words Jagat (Universe) and Nath (Lord of).

The District of Mayurbhanj preserves many temples built in different styles of Orissan architecture, such as Rekha, Bhadra and Gauriya. Among the Rekha temples the most important are the temples of Kakharua Baidyanath at Manatri of this district and that of Lord Jagannath at Baripada. The temple of Lord Jagannath at Baripada is universally known as Second SreeKhetra after Puri. It was built by Shri Baidyanath Bhanj in 1575 CE on the same architectural principles of Kakharua Baidyanath temple. The temple stands as a symbol of the religious favour of the Bhanja Rulers of Mayurbhanj and is regarded as the Queen Monad among the princely states during the pre-merger days. It is being celebrated for last 500+ years. The rituals of Baripada Rathayatra are special. It gives priority to the female devotees to pull Maa Subhadra's ratha, which is unique and also attracts female devotees from the neighbouring states.

== History ==
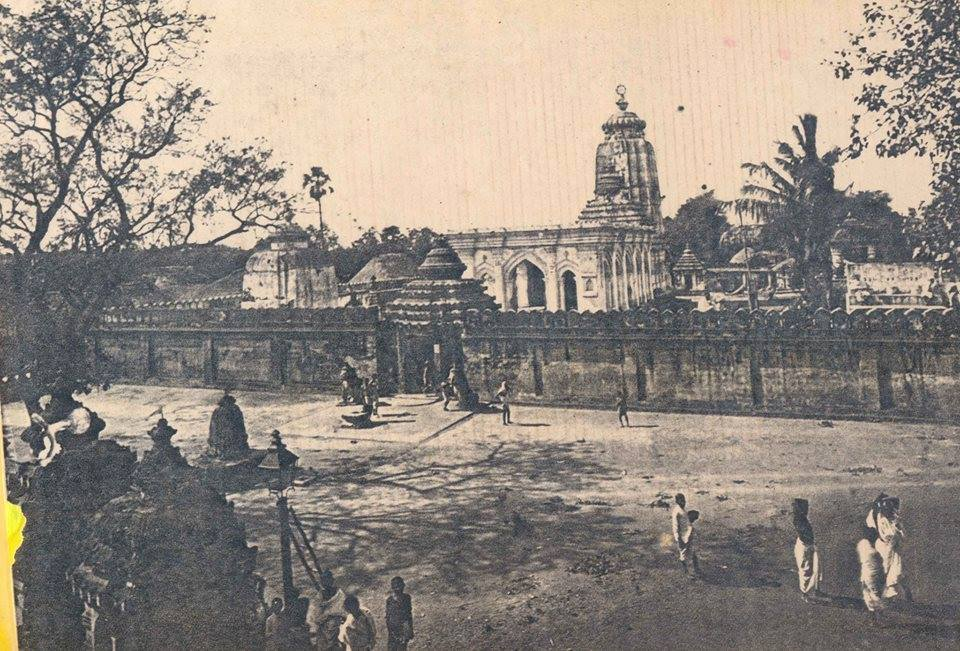
Shri Shri Hari Baladev Jew bije temple, c. 1900

There goes a saying that Maharaja Baidyanath Bhanj had been to Puri to have a Darshan of Lord Jagannath. Failing to offer the demanded gold coins, the king was denied to have a ‘Darshan’. Another version to the legend goes like this- When the Maharaja went to Puri in royal splendour with the accompaniment of ‘CHHATRO’ and ‘CHAMORO’ the Gajapati of Puri refused permission as it was display of higher status que over the ‘Thakur Raja of Puri’. The prevailing custom then was that the devotees to Puri will come as common man without showing of any supremacy over the Gajapati ‘who is Chalanti Vishnu Designate’. The Maharaja went in penance near the Atharnala, outskirt of Puri.

In a dream he was ordered by Lord Jagannath to construct a temple in Baripada so that he would come down to assuage his devotee. Showing deference to wishes of Lord Jagannath he constructed the majestic temple at Baripada. Like Puri, all the rituals for Lord Jagannath, Lord Balabhadra and Devi Suvadra are performed here at Baripada. The Bhanja Rulers, whose royal patronage in the field of architecture was at par excellence, would be remembered for their magnificent offering to Lord Jagannath in getting built the Jagannath temple prototype of Puri.

== Architecture ==
It is made of laterite stone with exquisite designs engraved in the walls. It has height of 84′-6″. A big boundary wall encircles the temple which is a replica of that of Lord Jagannath at Puri. An inscription on the temple wall states that in the year 1497 of the Saka Era this temple was built by Baidyanath Bhanj. This temple, like the Kakharua Baidyanath of Manatri is provided with Vimana, Jagamohan and Nata Mandira and is in a better preserved condition than the later. Besides the presiding deities, there are as many as seventeen Bedha deities consecrated in the temple. The Jagannath temple compound is provided with small cells in which the images of different religions find place. Among them may be seen images of Avalokiteswar Paraswanath and Umamaheswar. At the inner gate of this temple are found images of Jain Tirthankaras, Rishabhanath, Paraswanath and Mahavir beautifully carved out in black chlorite stone. There are various other pillars, images and structures both in front of the presiding deity and on the body of the temple. The walls of the Nata Mandira of Jagannath temple are decorated with pictures of mythological significance

The Radhamohan temple at Baripada serves as Gundicha Mandir (Mausi Maa Mandir) of Lord Jagannath. This temple along with Rasika Raya represents the cult of Neo-Vaishanavism which was popular in Orissa before Sri Chaitanya. This temple is provided with Nata Mandira and is beautifully painted inside as well as outside. The paintings in some of the niches and on the inner walls can be seen even now.

== Culture ==
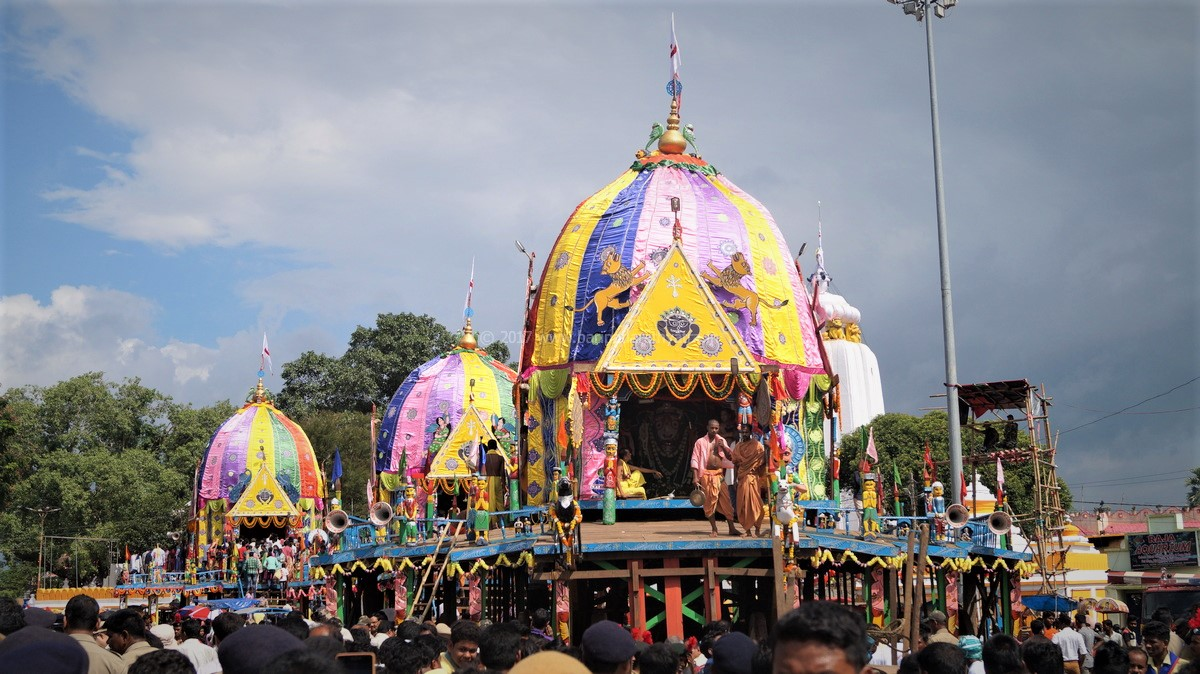
Chariots of the 3 deities at the Bada danda of Baripada

Baripada hosts the second most popular Rath Yatra of Odisha after Puri. It is also known as Dwitiya Srikshetra. Baripada’s Ratha Yatra is popular for its unique culture, pulling of the Chariot or Ratha of Maa Subhadra, only by the women. The chariots are big. All women are eager to pull the chariots.

There are two Jagannath temples in the town. While the bigger one organises the car festival with three chariots, the other temple is referred to as Banthia Jagannath (dwarf god) where the deities are smaller and only one car is used in the festival to take the trinity to Gundicha temple. Only the children are allowed to pull the chariot of the Banthia Jagannath Temple. The culturally sensitive city not only attracts crowd from the neighbouring districts, but also from other areas of bordering Jharkhand and West . The density of the crowd and the size of the chariot in Baripada also stand next only to Puri.

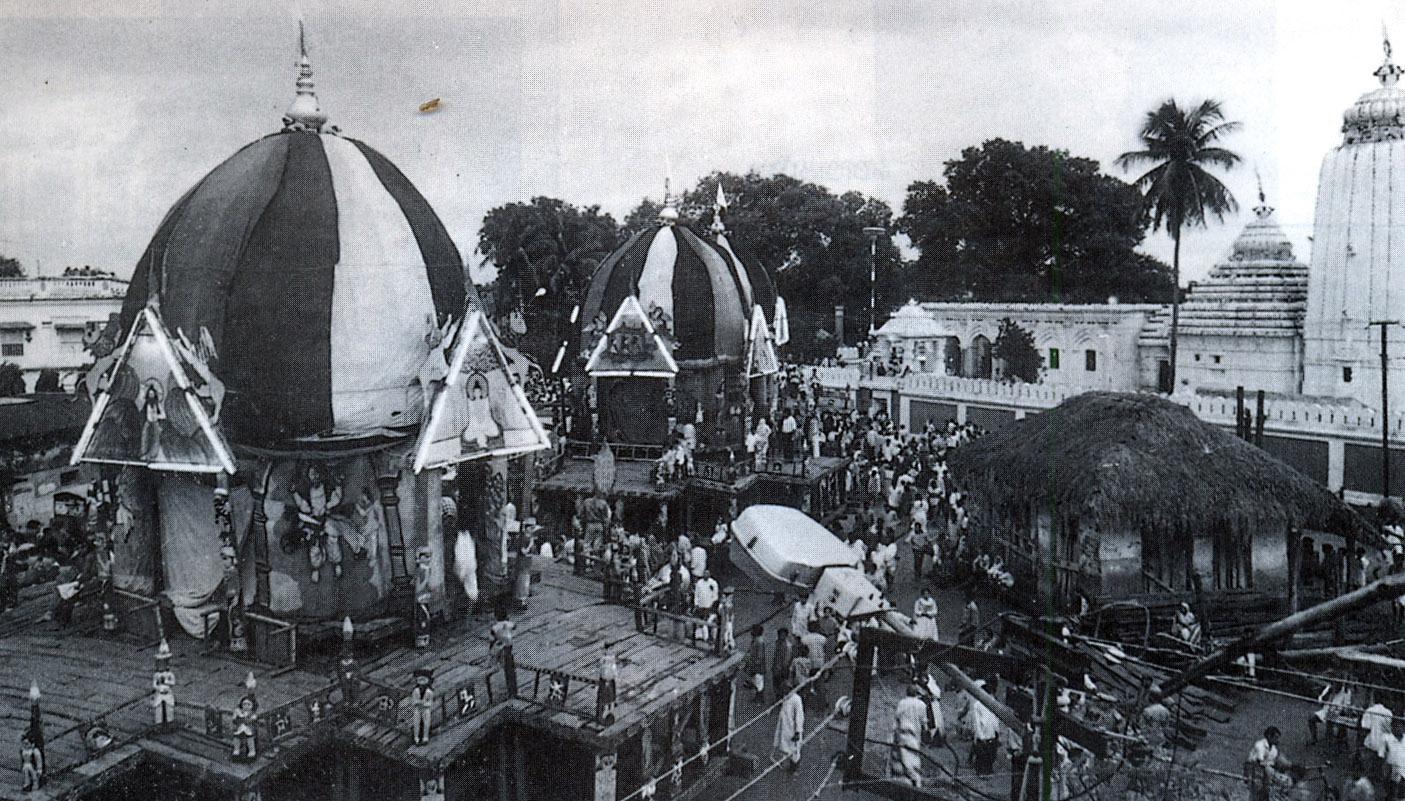
An old photo of Baripada Rath Yatra (Car Festival)

According to the History, Car Festival at Baripada has been started on AD 1575, the same year on which the temple construction was completed that started on AD 1565 and since then, the Car Festival has been taking place continuously without any interruption till 2019. However, on year 2020, due to the COVID-19 outbreak, the Car Festival has not took place to avoid community spreading of the CORONA VIRUS as prescribed by the District Administration.

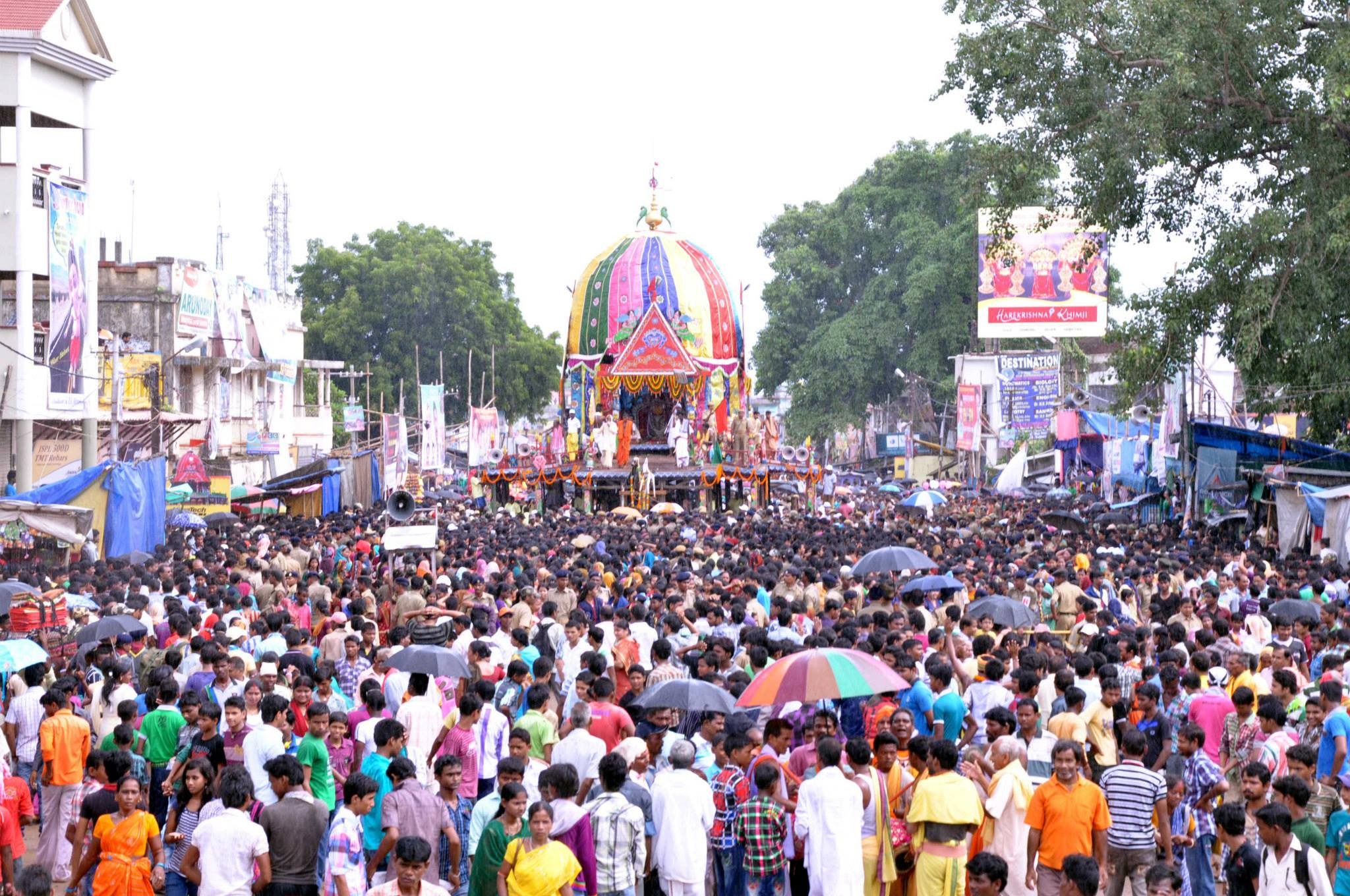
Devotees pulling the chariot

Thousands of men, women and children gather from different parts of the region at Baripada to pull the chariots of Goddess Shubhadra, Lord Jagannath, Lord Balabhadra on the grand road, known as Bada-danda. The three chariots are decorated with cotton fabric and chandua,

However, what puts Baripada on the top of the chart relating to rath yatra celebrations is perhaps the association of women with the festival. While the buzz around women empowerment is catching up with the active participation of the self-help groups across the state, Baripada was there to lead the path, decades ago. During the celebration of first International Women’s Year in 1975, the district administration of Mayurbhanj had started the innovative idea to let women pull the chariot of the little sister of the two Lords — Jagannath and Balabhadra.

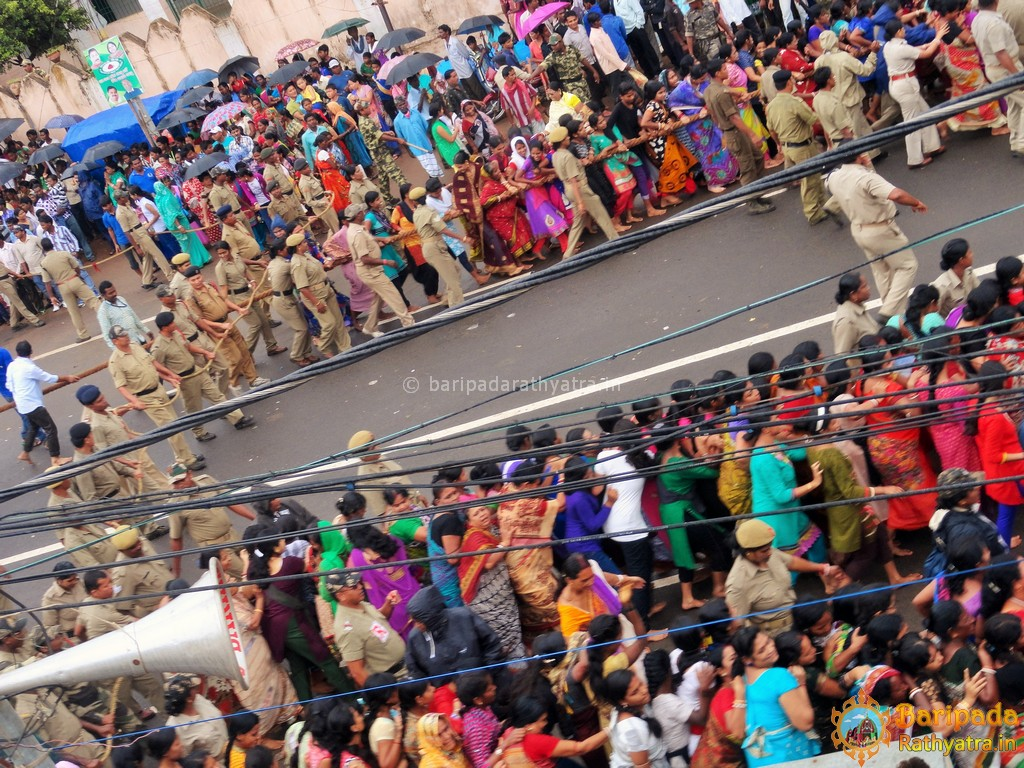
Women pulling the Chariot of Devi Subhadra in Ratha Yatra

In India, 1975 is known as the year of Emergency. But for the car festival in Baripada, the-then district collector Bibekananda Pattanayak took the initiative to start the unique tradition in the same year. It may be a coincidence that in 1975, Mrs. Indira Gandhi was the PM of India and Mrs. Nandini Satpathy was the CM of Odisha and this year was declared as International Women’s Year, from which, the women are pulling the chariot of Devi Subhadra, also known as the "Shaktee" to symbolize the empowerment of the women at Baripada and now-a-days, many places in India are hosting the Rathyatra, following the tradition of Baripada by involving the women in pulling the chariots.

The three deities go to their aunt’s house (Mausi-maa Mandir-Radha Mohan Mandir at Baripada) for nine days. For these nine days, the three deities eat the delicious sweets in the aunt’s house and the devotees got their sights in various forms, known as "Besas".

During these nine days, the small township of Baripada hosts three large chariots carrying Lord Jagannath, Lord Balabhadra and Devi Shubhadra. The celebrations include decorative lights and attracts devotees from across the district, neighboring districts and other states. The nine-day festival on Badadanda is associated with religious sentiments that touching the rope of Ratha of Lord Jagannath would mitigate the pain of rebirth and immortal soul would mingle with great soul of greatest creator of this Universe. Ratha yatra or Ghosha Yatra is observed in honor of the three deities. The construction of the chariot begins on the Akshaya Trutiya (Shukla Trutiya of Baishakha) day.

The Ratha Yatra consists of the following schedule in general:

- Netra Utsav-Ashadha Krushna Amabasya
- Uvayatra-Ashadha Shukla Pratipada
- Pahandi (Gundicha at Puri)-Ashadha Shukla Dwitiya
- Pulling of Chariots-Ashadha Trutiya & Chaturthi
- Bahuda Yatra & Pahandi-Ashadha Shukla Ekadashi
- Pulling of Bahuda Chariots-Ashadha Dwadashi & Trayodasi

The three deities arrive on the respective chariots after ‘Pahandi’. The pulling of the Chariots begins the next day at about 2:30PM and continues until 5:30PM. The 14-wheeled ‘Taldhwaja’(the chariot of Lord Balabhadra) moves first and reaches the ‘Mausi-maa’ temple. Thereafter 12-wheeled ‘Devidalan’ or ‘Vijaya’(chariot of Devi Shubhadra) is pulled only by ladies. Normally this chariot reaches half-way and stops near the town police station. Till this time, the evening arrives and so the pulling of chariots is stopped for safety and security reason. Next day at about 2:30 P.M the pulling of chariots is resumed and ‘Devadalan’ reaches the destination, the Mausi-maa temple. Then starts the "Nandighosh"(the massive chariot with 16 Wheels-largest of the three-of Lord Jagannath). With the accompaniment of resounding conch shells "Ghantas", the chariot Covers the distance majestically swaying both ways. The length of Badadanda from Shri Haribaldev jew temple to Mausi-maa temple is 3000 ft. When the chariots reach Gundicha temple, jaggery laddoos are thrown from the chariots to the frenzied crowd that jostle for a grain of sacred prasad.

On "Bahuda" Day, observed on Ashadha Shukla Ekadashi tithi, the same rituals of Pahandi are performed and chariots pulling is completed again in two days. As there is no space for the chariots to move around, the reverse sequence is followed in the return journey-First starts "Nandighosh", then Devadalan and then the "Taladhwaja". Then the 3 chariots arrive at the Bada-danda. The 3 deities give darshan to the mass till the next evening, followed by the Pahandi bije of the deities inside the temple.

This same schedule is observed in the same ways also at the Banthia Jagannatha Temple, also known as "Sana Jagannath" temple where there exists a single chariot of comparatively smaller in size then the 3 chariots of Shri Shri Haribaladev jew and this single chariot also holds a specialty. This chariot is being pulled only by the children.

== Gallery ==
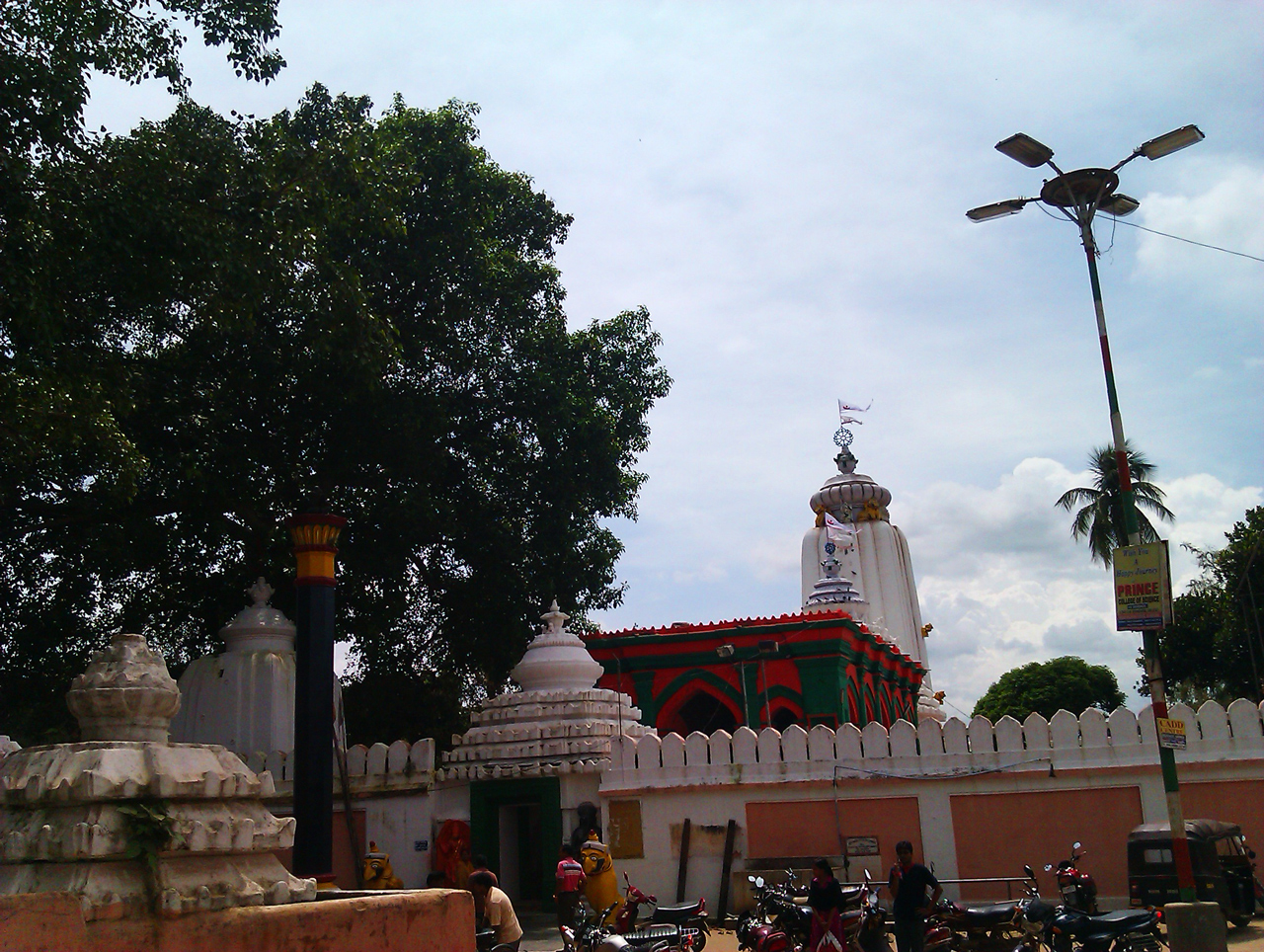
Front view with main door

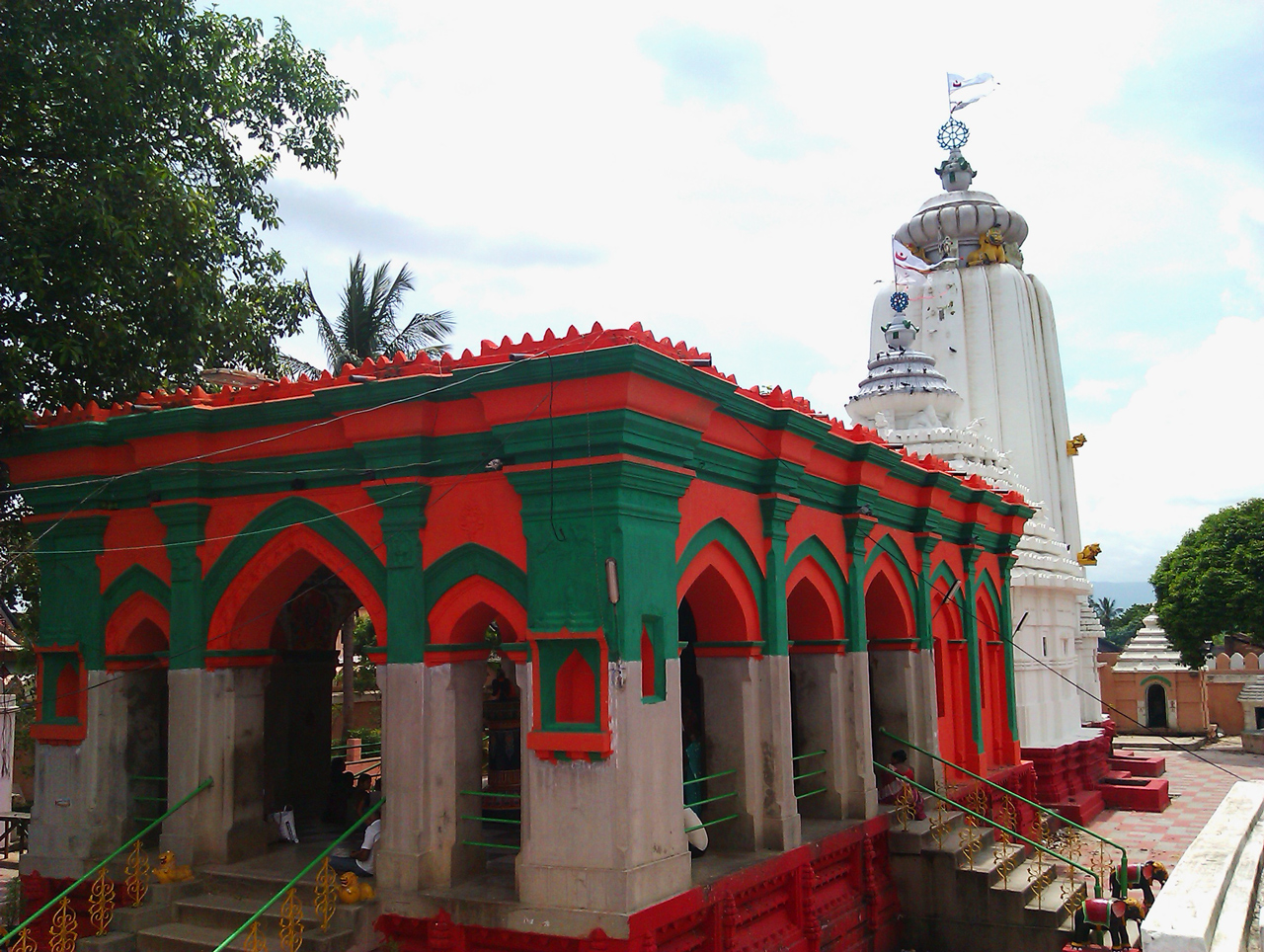
Temple with Mandapa

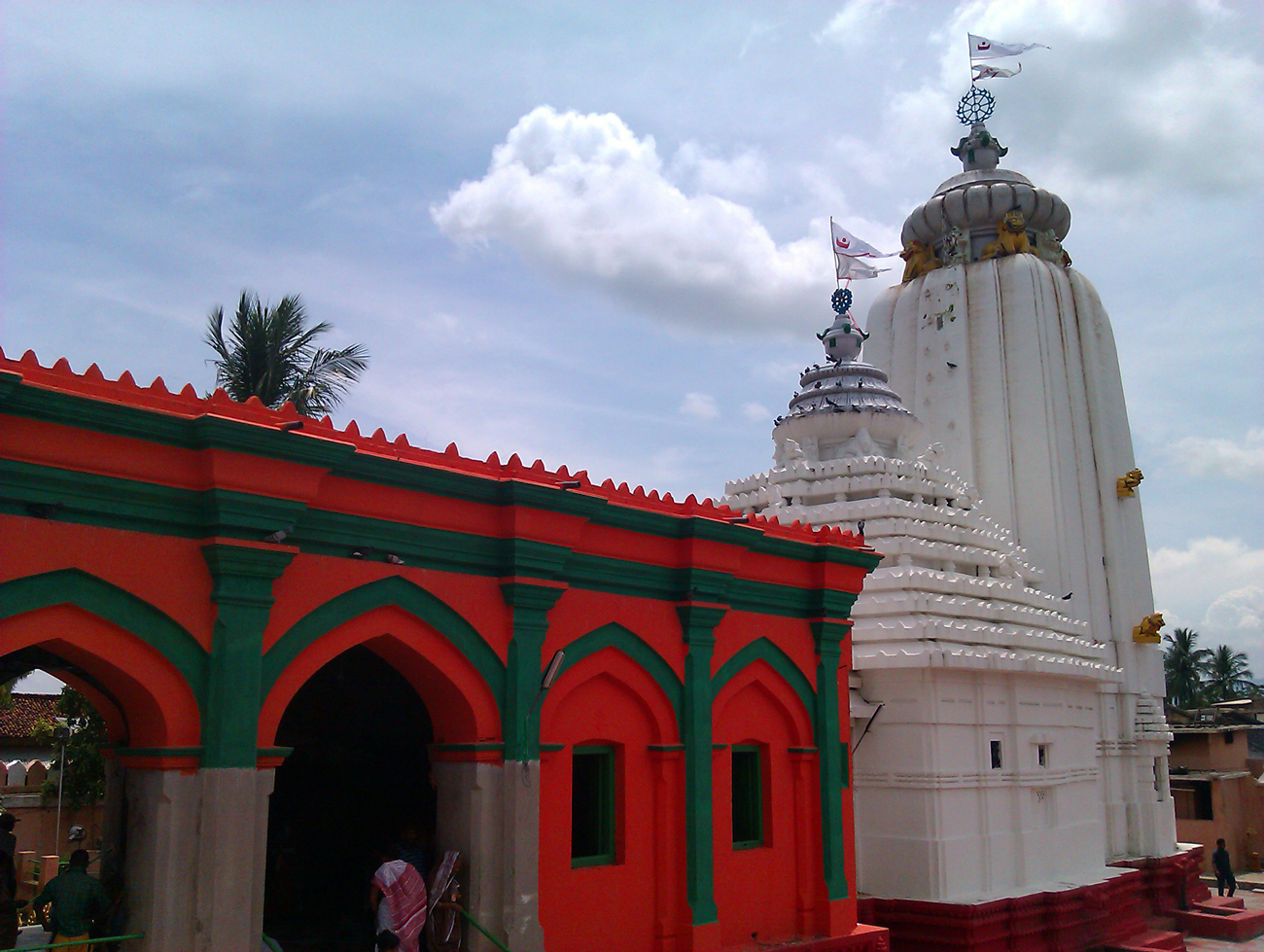
Temple

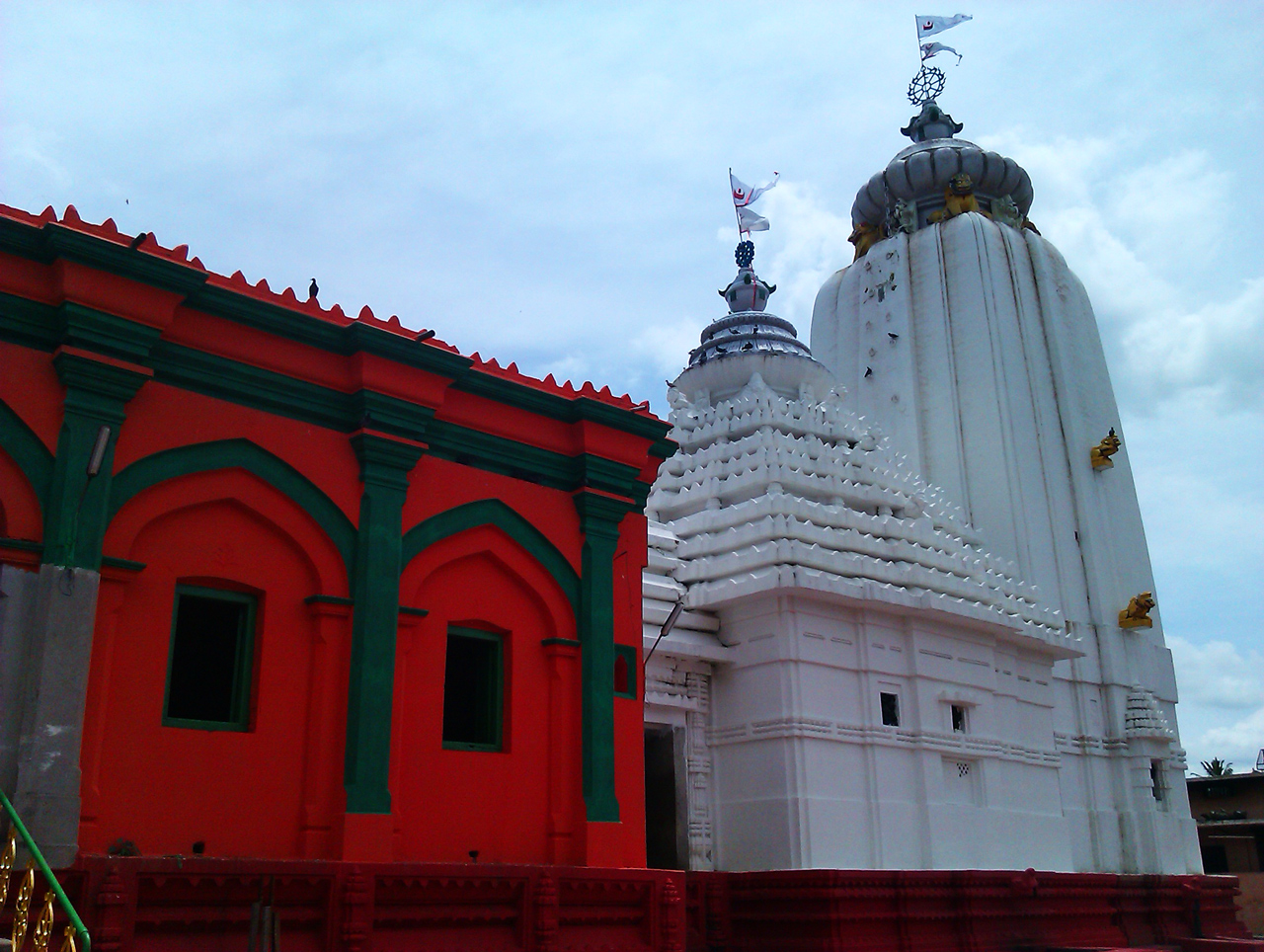
Temple

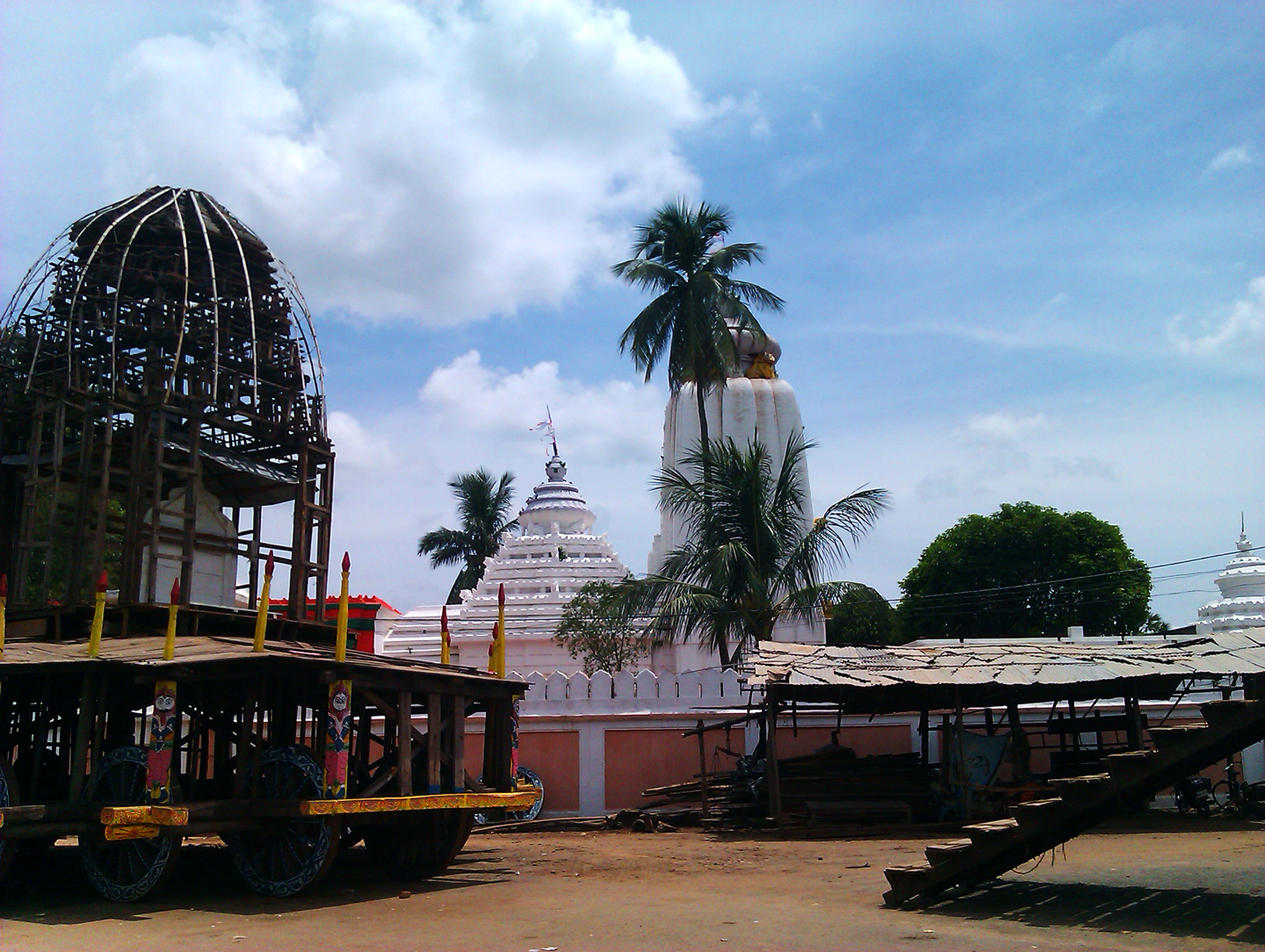
Chariot and side view of temple

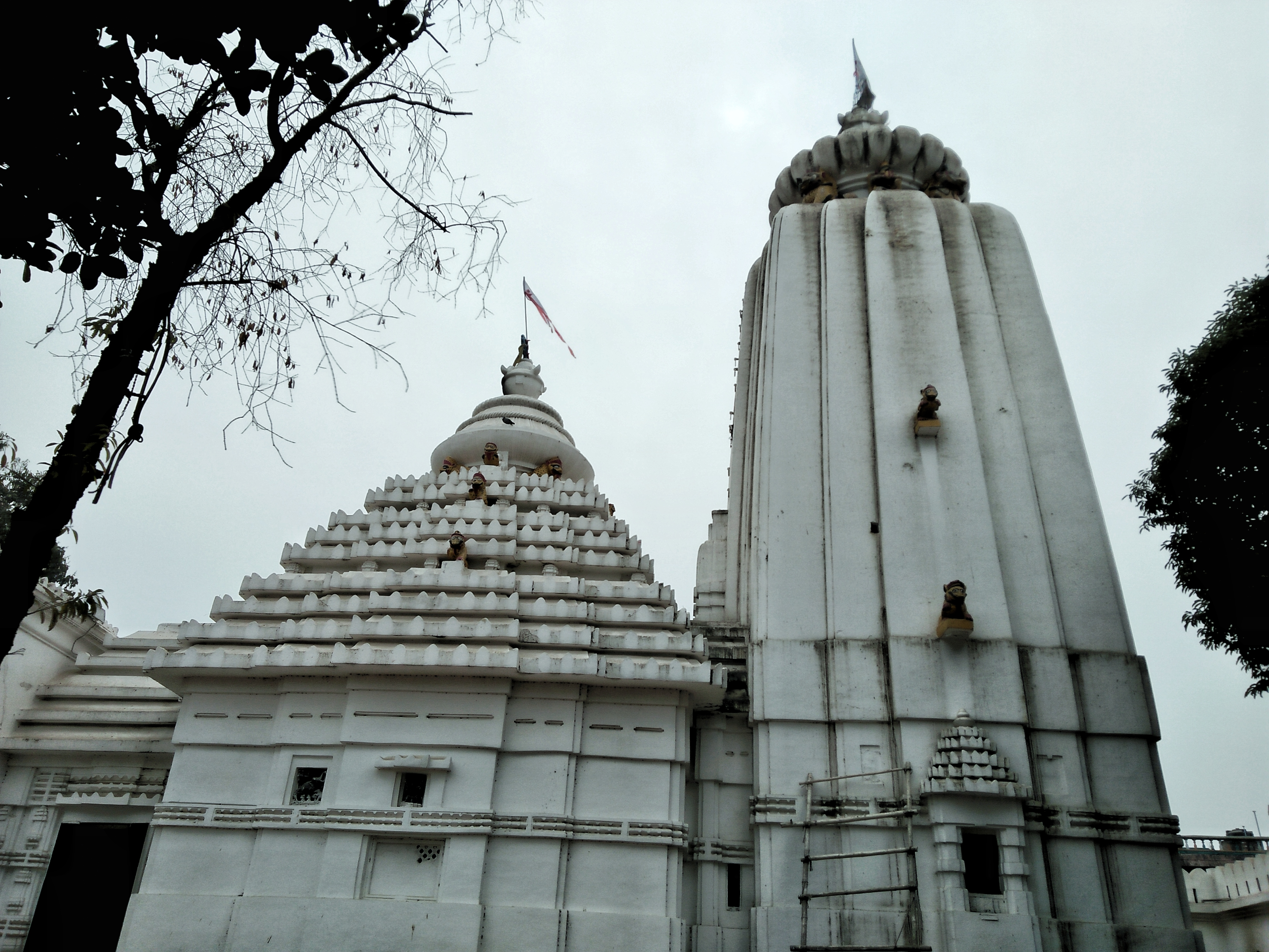
Vimana and Jagamohan of the temple

== See also ==
- Jagannath
- Patali Srikhetra
- Ratha Yatra
- Ananta Vasudeva Temple
- Baladevjew Temple
- Devadasi
- Juggernaut
