= Madaram Brahma =

Indian poet and dramatist

- Born: 1903; Kokrajhar, Dhubri District, Assam, India
- Died: 6 September 1990 (aged 86–87); Kokrajhar, Assam, India
- Occupations: Poet; Playwright
- Known for: Bodo literature
- Awards: Padma Shri

Madaram Brahma was an Indian poet and dramatist, who wrote in the Bodo language, a Sino-Tibetan language spoken by the Bodo people.

== Early life ==
Born in a Bodo family in 1903 at Kokrajhar in Dundhunikhata (present day Dhubri District) of the Northeast Indian state of Assam, he passed the matriculation from the local Government High School in Dhubri. His career started as a teacher and by 1932, he became the Headmaster of the Harisingha High School, Darang. In 1945, he joined the local administration, eventually becoming the first person of Bodo ethnicity to become a Block Development Officer.

== Professional career ==
Brahma wrote several poems, songs including hymns and plays which started with Boroni Gudi Sibsa Arw Aroj, a book of hymns and prayers written in Bodo language. His other works included Khonthai Methai (Poems and Lyrics–1923), Boroni Gudi Sipsa Arw Aroj (Bodo Hymn and Prayer Songs–1926), Raimali (Drama–1926), Dimapur Nwgwr Bainai (The fall of Dimapur, drama), Sadang Bairagi (Sadang, The Sanyasi, drama), Rupesri Raithai Khantai (Rupesri- Poems and Prose–1988) and Phangseao Bibar Barnwi (Two Flowers in the Branch). Some of his works are prescribed texts for school curriculum and civil services examination. The Government of India awarded him the fourth highest civilian honour of Padma Shri in 1988.

== Death ==
Madaram Brahma died, aged 87, on 6 September 1990, at Rupnath Brahma Civil Hospital in his native place. A local school, Padmasri Madaram Brahma Mes School is named after him.

== See also ==
- Bodo people
- Bodo language
