= BRAAAM =

Loud sound popular in film trailers

Example of BRAAAM used in isolation

BRAAAM (sometimes uncapitalized, or with varying numbers of repeated letters) is an onomatopoeia used to describe a loud, low sound that became popular in trailers for action films in the 2010s. It is commonly associated with the 2010 film Inception, but the origin of the sound as it appeared in the film is disputed. The sound and its variants are often referred to as the "Inception sound", the "Inception noise" or the "Inception horn".

== Description ==
BRAAAM is a loud, low sound typically produced using real or synthesized brass instruments. One of the best-known examples also involved a prepared piano. Seth Abramovitch of The Hollywood Reporter described the sound as "like a foghorn on steroids" which is "meant to impart a sense of apocalyptic momentousness". Vulture reported that the sound in Inception was created by four different wind instruments all playing the same note simultaneously and loudly – the bassoon, French horn, trombone and tuba – accompanied by a timpani.

Creators of the documentary Score called it "a staple of the modern film trailer – the brassy foghorn-like sound used as a way to emphasize something important". Literary scholar Adrian Daub called the sound "the noise that goes with people in spandex standing in a Delacroix-style tableau, or so Hollywood has decided. It is the sound we know is coming when a trailer intercuts CGI objects slamming into each other with portentous fades-to-black." Daub argued that BRAAAM contrasted with the scores of 1970s blockbusters which used environmental, ambient sounds to ground the film in a realistic atmosphere before transitioning to the fictionalized world and beginning the score. Whereas that style of separating sound design from the score helped separate the intensity of the film experience from the real world, "BRAAAM is an extreme kind of film scoring" which "means to freak us out".

== Origin ==
The sound, really, is that I put a piano in the middle of a church and I put a book on the pedal, and these brass players would basically play into the resonance of the piano. And then I added a bit of electronic nonsense.

— Hans Zimmer, interview with Vulture

The origin of the sound is disputed. It is frequently associated with the 2010 film Inception, although multiple people associated with the film have taken credit for it. Hans Zimmer, who composed the score for Inception, said in an interview with Vulture that he created the sound to satisfy the screenplay's description of "massive, low-end musical tones, sounding like distant horns". He arranged for brass instruments to be played into a piano, which was positioned in a church with a pedal held down, to which sound he later added "a bit of electronic nonsense".

Mike Zarin worked with Dave Rosenthal and Lauri Brown on the first Inception teaser trailer, working with a variety of subway and foley sounds to fit with the only scene which was available to him at the time. He was also told to create a sound for a visual: "if you imagined your hand was buried in sand, and you're slowly lifting it up, and you see something is starting to appear, and then all of a sudden the hand appears, and so then it's very clear". Rosenthal encouraged him to turn it into "a sound that cleared the room", and Brown suggested adding "a brass edge to it". Zarin claimed that the sound that emerged began with the sound effect that others had used in the second trailer. While the sound used in the eventual score was Zimmer's (based on a slowed down version of Édith Piaf's "Non, je ne regrette rien", which also plays an important role in the plot), Zarin accused Zimmer of improperly taking credit in his Vulture interview. Zimmer later told filmmakers of the documentary Score that "people were just sort of using them as transitional pieces" and that the innovation in the Inception score was to use them to "tell a story".

Zack Hemsey wrote the music for the film's third trailer, which included a likely synthesized horn BRAAAM sound that became popular on the internet for its volume. Hemsey did not claim credit for inventing the sound, but believed that it was his innovation to include the sound as part of the music rather than as an effect.

While Inception is widely regarded as popularizing the sound, several other prior films are recognized as using a BRAAAM-like sound. Zarin described the sound effects in the 2007 film Transformers as an early example, and Abramovitch pointed to the 2009 film District 9. According to Hemsey, the sound cannot be attributed to a single person as it is one iteration of an old musical device. Bobby Gumm, who has made several trailers using the BRAAAM sound, told The Hollywood Reporter that despite having become cliché since Inception, "they've used horns for ages to warn people. It's the signifier, the call to arms. It punches through to everything – and it's just one note."

== Popularization ==
IndieWire wrote in 2013 that BRAAAM had "become nearly omnipresent in blockbuster trailers [and] has become as recognizable as any piece of score or movie music". Zimmer came to dislike the soundtrack because it "became the blueprint for all action movies". Other films noted for use of the BRAAAM effect in their trailers include Transformers: Dark of the Moon (2011), Prometheus (2012), Battleship (2012), The Avengers (2012), Elysium (2013), World War Z (2013), Star Trek: Into Darkness (2013), Jack the Giant Slayer (2013), G.I. Joe: Retaliation (2013), Pacific Rim (2013), Mad Max: Fury Road (2015), Mission: Impossible – Rogue Nation (2015), and Batman v. Superman: Dawn of Justice (2016).

Since the popularization of BRAAAM, and its parody in popular culture, filmmakers and studio executives have tried to innovate by using different kinds of sounds to create the same effect. For example, the teaser for Jurassic World (2015) included a BRAAAM-like dinosaur roar.
