= Brahmin (disambiguation) =

Brahmin is a varna (class) in Hinduism specialising as scholars, priests, teachers (acharya) and protectors of sacred learning across generations.

Brahmin may also refer to:

- Brahman is breed cow raised for meat/beef
- Brahmaeidae, also known as "Brahmin moths", a family of insects
- Brahmin, a two headed breed of cattle found in the Fallout video game series
- Boston Brahmin, a term often used to refer to the oldest families in Boston in Massachusetts, United States

== See also ==
- Brahm (disambiguation)
- Brahma (disambiguation)
- Brahman (disambiguation)
- Brahmi (disambiguation)
- Brahmana
