= Brahmi (Unicode block) =

- Range: U+11000..U+1107F (128 code points)
- Plane: SMP
- Scripts: Brahmi
- Assigned: 115 code points
- Unused: 13 reserved code points

Unicode version history
- 6.0 (2010): 108 (+108)
- 7.0 (2014): 109 (+1)
- 14.0 (2021): 115 (+6)

Unicode documentation
- Code chart ∣ Web page

Brahmi is a Unicode block containing characters written in India from the 3rd century BCE through the first millennium CE. It is the predecessor to all modern Indic scripts.

Brahmi^{[1]}^{[2]} Official Unicode Consortium code chart (PDF)
	0	1	2	3	4	5	6	7	8	9	A	B	C	D	E	F
U+1100x	𑀀	𑀁	𑀂	𑀃	𑀄	𑀅	𑀆	𑀇	𑀈	𑀉	𑀊	𑀋	𑀌	𑀍	𑀎	𑀏
U+1101x	𑀐	𑀑	𑀒	𑀓	𑀔	𑀕	𑀖	𑀗	𑀘	𑀙	𑀚	𑀛	𑀜	𑀝	𑀞	𑀟
U+1102x	𑀠	𑀡	𑀢	𑀣	𑀤	𑀥	𑀦	𑀧	𑀨	𑀩	𑀪	𑀫	𑀬	𑀭	𑀮	𑀯
U+1103x	𑀰	𑀱	𑀲	𑀳	𑀴	𑀵	𑀶	𑀷	𑀸	𑀹	𑀺	𑀻	𑀼	𑀽	𑀾	𑀿
U+1104x	𑁀	𑁁	𑁂	𑁃	𑁄	𑁅	𑁆	𑁇	𑁈	𑁉	𑁊	𑁋	𑁌	𑁍		
U+1105x			𑁒	𑁓	𑁔	𑁕	𑁖	𑁗	𑁘	𑁙	𑁚	𑁛	𑁜	𑁝	𑁞	𑁟
U+1106x	𑁠	𑁡	𑁢	𑁣	𑁤	𑁥	𑁦	𑁧	𑁨	𑁩	𑁪	𑁫	𑁬	𑁭	𑁮	𑁯
U+1107x	𑁰	𑁱	𑁲	𑁳	𑁴	𑁵										BNJ
Notes: 1. As of Unicode version 16.0; 2. Grey areas indicate non-assigned code points

== History ==
The following Unicode-related documents record the purpose and process of defining specific characters in the Brahmi block:

Version	Final code points (Note: Proposed code points and characters names may differ from final code points and names)	Count	L2 ID	WG2 ID	Document
6.0	U+11000..1104D, 11052..1106F	108	L2/98-032	N1685	Everson, Michael (1998-01-18), Proposal to encode Brahmi in Plane 1 of ISO/IEC 10646
6.0	U+11000..1104D, 11052..1106F	108	L2/98-286	N1703	Umamaheswaran, V. S.; Ksar, Mike (1998-07-02), "8.19", Unconfirmed Meeting Minutes, WG 2 Meeting #34, Redmond, WA, USA; 1998-03-16--20
6.0	U+11000..1104D, 11052..1106F	108	L2/00-128		Bunz, Carl-Martin (2000-03-01), Scripts from the Past in Future Versions of Unicode
6.0	U+11000..1104D, 11052..1106F	108	L2/02-397		Baums, Stefan; Glass, Andrew (2002-11-02), Note for the UTC on the encoding of Brahmi in Unicode
6.0	U+11000..1104D, 11052..1106F	108	L2/03-249R		Baums, Stefan; Glass, Andrew (2003-07-27), Proposal for the Encoding of Brahmi in Plane 1 of ISO/IEC 10646
6.0	U+11000..1104D, 11052..1106F	108	L2/08-277R	N3490R	Everson, Michael; Glass, Andrew; Baums, Stefan (2007-08-14), Progressing the encoding of Brahmi in the SMP of the UCS
6.0	U+11000..1104D, 11052..1106F	108	L2/07-342	N3491	Baums, Stefan; Glass, Andrew (2007-10-09), Proposal for the encoding of Brāhmī in Plane 1 of ISO/IEC 10646
6.0	U+11000..1104D, 11052..1106F	108	L2/07-406		Glass, Andrew; Baums, Stefan (2007-10-31), Scripts on Roadmap covered by Brahmi encoding (L2/07-342)
6.0	U+11000..1104D, 11052..1106F	108	L2/08-253R2		Moore, Lisa (2008-08-19), "Brahmi (B.15.1, C.3.1)", UTC #116 Minutes
6.0	U+11000..1104D, 11052..1106F	108	L2/08-412	N3553 (pdf, doc)	Umamaheswaran, V. S. (2008-11-05), "M53.22", Unconfirmed minutes of WG 2 meeting 53
6.0	U+11000..1104D, 11052..1106F	108	L2/12-020		Sharma, Shriramana (2012-01-12), Special rendering of some jihvamuliya/upadhmaniya characters
6.0	U+11000..1104D, 11052..1106F	108	L2/12-031		Anderson, Deborah; McGowan, Rick; Whistler, Ken (2012-01-27), "III. BRAHMI", Review of Indic-related L2 documents and Recommendations to the UTC
6.0	U+11000..1104D, 11052..1106F	108	L2/12-007		Moore, Lisa (2012-02-14), "Consensus 130-C11", UTC #130 / L2 #227 Minutes, "The UTC has determined that a virama should not be used in Sharada sequences involving Jihvamuliya and Upadhmaniya."
6.0	U+11000..1104D, 11052..1106F	108	L2/12-106		Sharma, Shriramana (2012-03-17), "5. Brahmi", Request for editorial updates to various Indic scripts
6.0	U+11000..1104D, 11052..1106F	108	L2/12-147		Anderson, Deborah; McGowan, Rick; Whistler, Ken (2012-04-25), "V. BRAHMI", Review of Indic-related L2 documents and Recommendations to the UTC
6.0	U+11000..1104D, 11052..1106F	108	L2/12-239		Moore, Lisa (2012-08-14), "Consensus 132-C16", UTC #132 Minutes, "Create a glyph erratum for Brahmi Letter LLLA based on the image in document L2/12-292."
6.0	U+11000..1104D, 11052..1106F	108	L2/14-066		Sharma, Shriramana (2014-02-07), Representation of the Brahmi and Kannada Jihvamuliya/Upadhmaniya Characters in the Code Charts
6.0	U+11000..1104D, 11052..1106F	108	L2/16-343		A, Srinidhi; A, Sridatta (2016-11-05), Request to change the glyphs of Brahmi vowel signs Vocalic R and Vocalic RR
6.0	U+11000..1104D, 11052..1106F	108	L2/16-321R		A, Srinidhi; A, Sridatta (2016-12-23), Request to change the glyph of 11008 BRAHMI LETTER II
6.0	U+11000..1104D, 11052..1106F	108	L2/17-037		Anderson, Deborah; Whistler, Ken; Pournader, Roozbeh; Glass, Andrew; Iancu, Laurențiu; Moore, Lisa; Liang, Hai; Ishida, Richard; Misra, Karan; McGowan, Rick (2017-01-21), "3. Brahmi", Recommendations to UTC #150 January 2017 on Script Proposals
6.0	U+11000..1104D, 11052..1106F	108	L2/17-016		Moore, Lisa (2017-02-08), "Consensus 150-C11, Action item 150-A64", UTC #150 Minutes
6.0	U+11000..1104D, 11052..1106F	108	L2/17-224		McGowan, Rick (2017-07-25), "Dotted box for Brahmi/Kannada fricative characters", Comments on Public Review Issues (May 01 - July 25, 2017)
6.0	U+11000..1104D, 11052..1106F	108	L2/17-426		A, Srinidhi; A, Sridatta (2017-12-08), Request to change the glyphs of THIRTY and FORTY of Brahmi
6.0	U+11000..1104D, 11052..1106F	108	L2/18-039		Anderson, Deborah; Whistler, Ken; Pournader, Roozbeh; Moore, Lisa; Liang, Hai; Cook, Richard (2018-01-19), "8. Brahmi", Recommendations to UTC #154 January 2018 on Script Proposals
6.0	U+11000..1104D, 11052..1106F	108	L2/17-362		Moore, Lisa (2018-02-02), "153-A92", UTC #153 Minutes
6.0	U+11000..1104D, 11052..1106F	108	L2/18-115		Moore, Lisa (2018-05-09), "Action item 154-A103", UTC #155 Minutes, "Create a glyph erratum for U+1105D and U+1105E."
7.0	U+1107F	1	L2/10-340		Sharma, Shriramana (2010-09-14), Using ZWJ in the encoded representation of Brahmi numbers
7.0	U+1107F	1	L2/10-440		Anderson, Deborah; McGowan, Rick; Whistler, Ken (2010-10-27), "3. Brahmi Numbers", Review of Indic-related L2 documents and Recommendations to the UTC
7.0	U+1107F	1	L2/10-416R		Moore, Lisa (2010-11-09), "Action item 125-A20", UTC #125 / L2 #222 Minutes, "Create an alternate proposal for Brahmi numbers."
7.0	U+1107F	1	L2/11-357R	N4166	Glass, Andrew; Sharma, Shriramana (2011-11-02), Proposal to encode 1107F Brahmi Number Joiner
7.0	U+1107F	1	L2/11-353		Moore, Lisa (2011-11-30), "D.8", UTC #129 / L2 #226 Minutes
7.0	U+1107F	1		N4253 (pdf, doc)	"M59.16d", Unconfirmed minutes of WG 2 meeting 59, 2012-09-12
14.0	U+11070..11075	6	L2/19-402		Rajan, Vinodh; Sharma, Shriramana (2019-12-18), Proposal to Encode 6 Characters in the Brahmi Block
14.0	U+11070..11075	6	L2/20-046		Anderson, Deborah; Whistler, Ken; Pournader, Roozbeh; Moore, Lisa; Liang, Hai (2020-01-10), "7. Brahmi", Recommendations to UTC #162 January 2020 on Script Proposals
14.0	U+11070..11075	6	L2/20-015R		Moore, Lisa (2020-05-14), "D.3 Proposal to Encode 6 Characters in the Brahmi Block", Draft Minutes of UTC Meeting 162
14.0	U+11070..11075	6	L2/20-129		Ganesan, Naga (2020-06-01), Comments on L2/20-069: Encoding of Tamil Brahmi Virama (U+11070)
14.0	U+11070..11075	6	L2/20-169		Anderson, Deborah; Whistler, Ken; Pournader, Roozbeh; Moore, Lisa; Constable, Peter; Liang, Hai (2020-07-21), "10. Brahmi", Recommendations to UTC #164 July 2020 on Script Proposals
14.0	U+11070..11075	6	L2/20-172		Moore, Lisa (2020-08-03), "Consensus 164-C13", UTC #164 Minutes
