= Brahman (disambiguation) =

Brahman is a term in Hinduism for the metaphysical ultimate reality, the highest unchanging Universal Principle in the universe.

Brahman may also refer to:

- Brahman languages, a hypothetical Trans–New Guinea family of languages spoken in Madang Province in Papua New Guinea
- Brahman (band), a Japanese rock band
- Brahman (cattle) is a breed of cattle descended from the Bos indicus

== See also ==
- Brahmin, a priestly varna/caste
- Brahmana, an important layer of Hindu canonical text that is part of each of the Vedas
- Bramman, a 2014 Indian film directed by Socrates
- Para Brahman
- Brahmani (disambiguation)
- Brahm (disambiguation)
- Brahma (disambiguation)
- Brahmin (disambiguation)
- Braman (disambiguation)
