= Bram van de Beek =

Dutch theologian

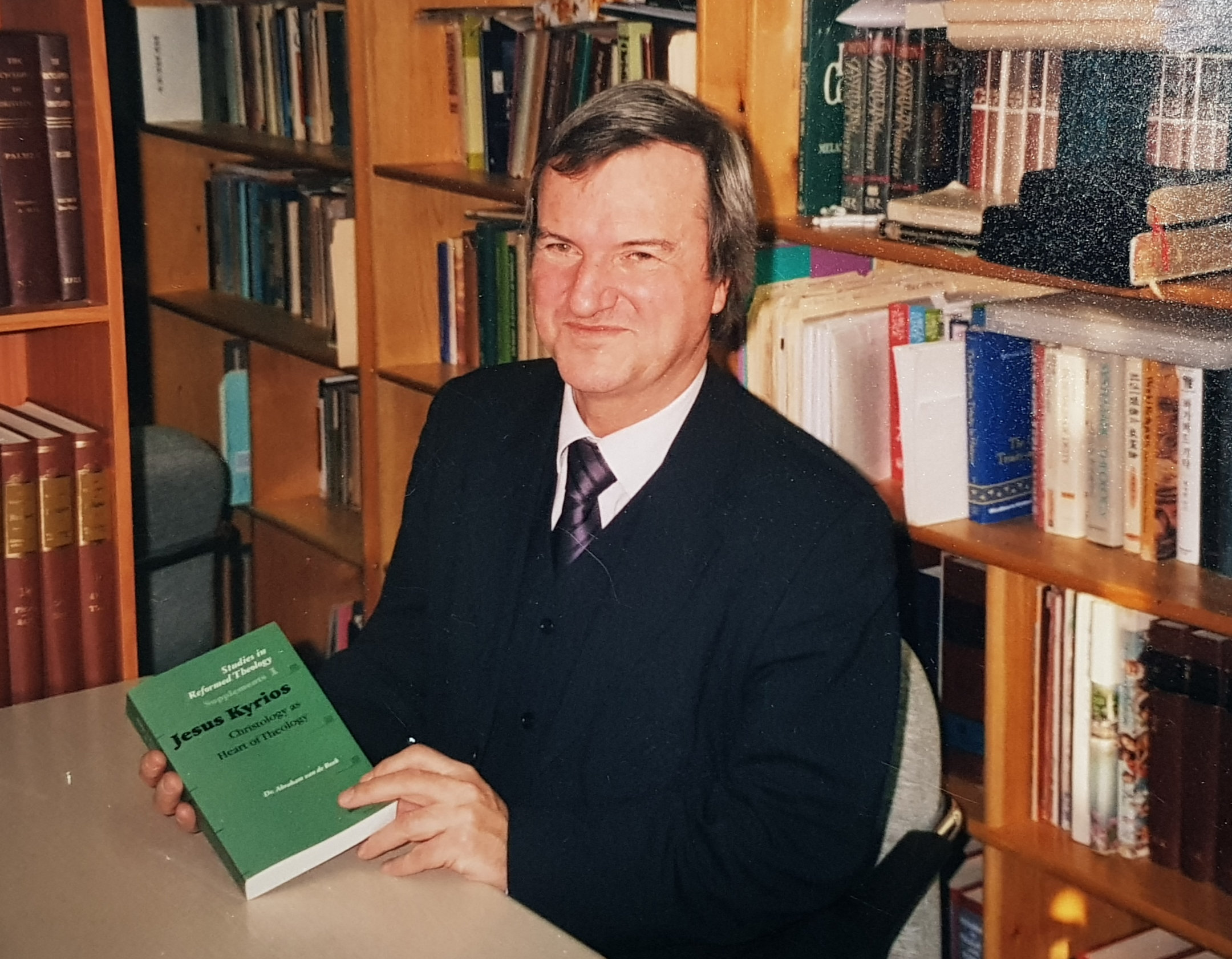
Dr. Bram van de Beek

Abraham "Bram" van de Beek (born 9 October 1946) is a Dutch Reformed theologian. He was a professor of biblical and systematic theology at Leiden University between 1981 and 2000. Subsequently he was professor of Christian symbolism at the Vrije Universiteit Amsterdam until 2010.

== Career ==
Van de Beek was born on 9 October 1946 in Lunteren. Between 1964 and 1970 he studied theology at Utrecht University, obtaining a master's degree under Arnold van Ruler. Four years later, although not have studied biology, he earned a PhD in botany with a thesis on brambles titled Die Brombeeren des Geldrische distriktes innerhalb der Flora der Niederlande under F.P. Jonker at the same university. Van de Beek then moved to Leiden University and earned a DTh in 1980 with a thesis titled De menselijke persoon van Christus under supervision of Hendrikus Berkhof. Although having written a thesis in botany Van de Beek never considered a career in the field, but kept interested and continued publishing in it. In 2021 he published an article on brambles in South Africa.

Van de Beek was a minister in the Dutch Reformed Church between 1970 and 1981. At Lexmond, his first parish, he dealt with twenty vehicular deaths in four years. In 1974 he moved parish to Vriezenveen and in 1979 to Raamsdonk. In 1981 he started as professor of biblical and systematic theology at Leiden University. At that point in time he had only one publication in the field. He remained a professor at Leiden University until 2000, in that year he became professor of Christian symbolism at the Vrije Universiteit Amsterdam. From 2005 to 2008 he was dean of the faculty of theology. In 2010 he took up an early retirement due to an illness of his wife. Van de Beek also served as professor not paid from university funds at Stellenbosch University from 2003.

== Honours and awards ==
In 1997 Van de Beek was elected a member of the Royal Netherlands Academy of Arts and Sciences. In 2012, a Festschrift was published in his honour: Strangers and Pilgrims on Earth: Essays in Honour of Abraham van de Beek. In November 2022, during the night of theology, Van de Beek received an award for his complete works, which comprised over 6000 pages excluding publications in English.
