= Bram (wolf) =

Wolf living in the Netherlands (c. 2022–2025)

- Species: Wolf
- Sex: Male
- Died: 1 December 2025; Utrecht Hill Ridge
- Cause of death: Gunshot
- Resting place: Naturalis Biodiversity Center
- Years active: c. 2022–2025
- Known for: Attacking humans and dogs

Bram (Dutch: probleemwolf Bram, lit. 'Bram the problem wolf'), officially designated GW3237m, was a wolf living in the Netherlands from c. 2022 to 2025. Unusually unafraid of dogs and humans, he was involved in several incidents between 2024 and 2025. This ultimately led to his killing being approved, a rare and controversial decision that came amid wider debate about the place of wolves in the Netherlands.

== Incidents ==
In 2024, Bram was involved in multiple incidents with dogs. This led the province of Utrecht to grant a permit to capture, sedate and put a transmitter on him, so that he could be negatively conditioned with a paintball gun. However, the decision was contested in court by environmental activists and subsequently stricken down.

On 19 May 2025, a hiker was bitten by an animal in the Den Treek-Henschoten estate, part of Leusden municipality in Utrecht Province. This led to a recommendation to avoid the estate, pending confirmation through a DNA test that this was a wolf attack as suspected. Following this new attack, the Province of Utrecht this time issued a permit to shoot the wolf, deeming him a risk for public safety. The decision was upheld in court after objections from animal rights groups. On 16 July 2025, a five-year old girl was attacked by a wolf at the Den Treek estate. There was debate about whether the injuries she sustained could have been caused by a wolf bite, and DNA analysis was not possible. However, the investigation was still able to conclude that a wolf was most likely responsible for the attack. On 30 July 2025, a six-year-old playing near the Pyramid of Austerlitz was attacked by a wolf. The boy suffered bites and abrasions to his back and under his armpit, as described by his parents and on photos provided to the media. While wolf experts already suspected Bram was responsible, this was confirmed two weeks later following an emergency DNA analysis performed at Wageningen University. In the same announcement, the Province of Utrecht reiterated its advice to avoid the surrounding area.

== Killing ==
On 1 December 2025, a wolf was shot dead in the Utrecht Hill Ridge. While confirmation of its identity with a DNA test was pending, animal rights groups called the shooting a "disgrace" and threatened legal action if the wolf shot did not turn out to be Bram. On 12 December, it was confirmed that the dead wolf was indeed Bram. The same day, the province of Utrecht withdrew its advice against visiting estates, forest and nature reserves on the Utrecht Hill Ridge. His remains were sent to the Dutch Wildlife Health Centre (DWHC), affiliated with Utrecht University. His taxidermy skin will be displayed at the Naturalis Biodiversity Center before being moved to the Natural History Museum Rotterdam.
