= Brahma (given name) =

Brahma is a masculine given name which is borne by:

- Brahma Chellaney (born 1962), Indian geostrategist and columnist
- Brahma Nath Katju (born 1927), Indian judge, Chief Justice of the Allahabad High Court
- Brahma Prakash, 21st century Indian cultural theorist, writer and academic
- Brahma Singh (1941–2023), Indian horticultural scientist
