= Ferdinand de Brahm =

Military engineer

Ferdinand Joseph Sébastien de Brahm (1752–1822) was a surveyor and a military engineer.

De Brahm was born in the Holy Roman Empire in 1752. He began work as a military Engineer under the Prince-Elector of Trier before coming to America to assist his uncle, William Gerard de Brahm, the Surveyor General of Georgia, South Carolina, and East Florida, in charting a series of nautical maps. Then, upon the outbreak of the Revolutionary War, de Brahm joined the Corps of Engineers, attaining the rank of Captain and then Major. He charted maps of campaigns in New York and Pennsylvania (1777–1779); during the Siege of Charleston he kept a detailed journal of the onslaught (1780).

He was elected as a member to the American Philosophical Society in 1784.
