= Brahmani Temple =

Brahmani temple ବ୍ରାହ୍ମଣୀ ମନ୍ଦିର

Religion
- Affiliation: Hinduism
- District: Baleswar
- Deity: Avaloketesvara, Chamunda
- Festival: Durga Puja
- Governing body: Laxmi Narayan Puja Committee

Location
- Location: Avana
- State: Orissa
- Country: India
- Interactive map of Brahmani temple ବ୍ରାହ୍ମଣୀ ମନ୍ଦିର
- Coordinates: 21°15′21.12″N 86°48′33.8″E

Architecture
- Type: Orissan Pidha vimana temple architecture
- Creator: Somavamsi rule
- Completed: 10th–11th centuries

Brahmani temple (Odia: ବ୍ରାହ୍ମଣୀ ମନ୍ଦିର) is a Hindu and Buddhist temple located in Avana, Baleswar, Odisha, India built in the 10th–11th centuries A.D. It is a living temple and the presiding deity is an eight-armed three-faced Chamunda image. It is a protected monument of Odisha State Archaeology.

== Location ==
It is on the left bank of the river Son and is about 6 km north of Ajodhya. It is 21 km from the Baleshwar town, Orissa.

== Construction ==
It is a pidha temple followed by a flat roofed open mandapa. The presiding deity of the temple is an eight-armed Chamunda image and iconographically it can be dated to the 10th–11th centuries A.D. The temple is a modern one but it houses a few important specimen of Buddhist and Saviate sculptures, datable to the same centuries.

=== Quantification ===
- Area dimension (L x B x H): 4.20 m x 4.00 m x 6.50 m
- Number of blocks: Two, vimana followed by a mandapa

=== Spatial organization ===
- Orientation: Facing towards west
- Plan: The vimana is square; mandapa is rectangular
- Allocation of spaces: 10 m x 4.50 m in length and width respectively

=== Architectural style ===
==== Ornamentation ====
- Exteriors: Plain
- Interiors: Plain
- Movable collections: Four-armed Avaloketesvara, eight-armed and three-faced Chamunda.
- It is a recently built shrine with pancharatha on plan and panchanga bada in elevation.

==== Construction technology ====
- Structural System: It has a pidha vimana fronted by a flat Jaga mohan. The vimana is pancharatha on plan and panchaga bada in elevation.
- Building techniques: Ashlar masonry
- Material of construction: Laterite used for the temple; the images are made of chlorite stone.

Vermilion and oil is regularly applied over the images by the priest, which may be harmful for the stone carvings in long run.
