= Brahma (poem) =

Poem

"Brahma" is a poem by Ralph Waldo Emerson, written in 1856, and published in the November 1857 issue of The Atlantic. It is named for Brahman, the universal principle of the Vedas.

== About ==
Brahma is one of the poems composed by Ralph Waldo Emerson, an American transcendentalist of the nineteenth century. The poem is composed in the form of an utterance- a form which comprises sublime or metaphysical content while adding to it the balladic quatrain-music pattern. (A dramatic form not in vogue, and distinctly different from Browning's dramatic developments). The form, therefore, is the first of its kind to include Oriental poetical material in the Western verse framework. The central speaker of the poem is Brahman Himself, who according to Hindu philosophers of India, is omnipotent, omniscient and omnipresent. The study of the vedantic philosophy, the Gita, and the Katha Upanishad is impressed upon the poem very forcefully. Body is transient, but within the body of man there is the soul that is the divine spark, eternal, everlasting and never-ending. It is a part of the over-soul who is the supreme God, the superpower of the universe.

The first group of American thinkers who observed the non-western philosophy were the transcendentalists. Emerson was the leader and other prominent members of this group were Thoreau, Margaret Fuller, Alcott and Elizabeth Peabody. Transcendentalism opposed the dogmatic concept of belief and urged to think freely. Transcendentalism has the principle that the answer to man's cause is an acceptance of the final liberation – a quality that the biblical religion imposed, and a quality that Hinduism attests as true, ultimately pleasurable and most importantly, to be thought out as a thinking individual- a quality that most appealed Emerson and his decision in giving up his institution of Unitarianism.

Different religions have different beliefs about their deity but the core concern of all is the Brahman, the superpower. Thus, the theme of the poem is universal: The Brahman, the superpower, has many little parts atman, the human, who has to achieve salvation (linkage of atman to the Brahman), but entrapped in Maya, transient one, the physical beauty of the world. One who can overcome the Maya will certainly understand the Brahman i.e. the achievement of salvation.

Brahman is the philosophical explication of the universal spirit by that name. The poetic form of elastic quatrain is used to represent the solemn nature of the subject. Throughout the poem, the Brahman appears as the only speaker, sustaining the continuity of the work. That the spirit is the only speaker signifies not only its absolute nature but also its sustaining power, upon which the existence of the entire universe metaphorically, the poem is based.

== Text ==
If the red slayer think he slays,
Or if the slain think he is slain,
They know not well the subtle ways
I keep, and pass, and turn again.

Far or forgot to me is near;
Shadow and sunlight are the same;
The vanished gods to me appear;
And one to me are shame and fame.

They reckon ill who leave me out;
When me they fly, I am the wings;
I am the doubter and the doubt,
I am the hymn the Brahmin sings.

The strong gods pine for my abode,
And pine in vain the sacred Seven;
But thou, meek lover of the good!
Find me, and turn thy back on heaven.
