= Brahms (surname) =

Surname list

Brahms is a German surname. Notable people with the surname include:

- Albert Brahms (1692–1758), German land owner
- Caryl Brahms (1901–1982), English writer
- David M. Brahms (born 1938), Brigadier General of the United States Marine Corps
- Helma Sanders-Brahms (1940–2014), German film director
- Johannes Brahms (1833–1897), German composer and pianist
- William B. Brahms (born 1966), American historian

Fictional characters:

- Leah Brahms, character in Star Trek: The Next Generation
- Miss Brahms, character from the British comedy show Are You Being Served?
