= Yeoman (United States Navy) =

U.S. Navy enlisted person who performs administrative and clerical work

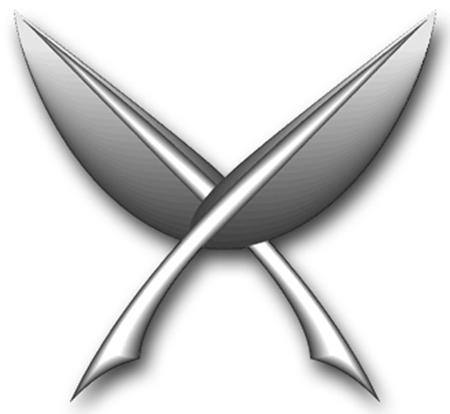
- Rating insignia
- Issued by: United States Navy
- Type: Enlisted rating
- Abbreviation: YN / YNS (Submarine)
- Specialty: Administration

The yeoman rate is one of the oldest rates in the U.S. Navy, dating back to 1794. Historically, the Navy yeomen were responsible for keeping the storerooms for the ship's gunners, carpenters and boatswains. With the transition from sail to steam, yeomen were assigned to the ship's engineers. In the modern Navy, a yeoman is an enlisted service member who performs administrative and clerical work.

== History ==
=== Formation of the U.S. Navy ===
The U.S. Constitution (Article I, Section 8, Clause 14) granted the new U.S. Congress the power to build and maintain a navy. It was not until 1794, however, that deteriorating U.S. relations with Great Britain and France, as well as continuing attacks by Barbary pirates, forced Congress to appropriate funds to construct 6 frigates. Congress stipulated that each ship was to have one yeoman of the gun room and one captain's clerk. The captain's clerk was the ancestor of the modern yeoman. Both of these positions were considered as petty officers. Carpenter's yeoman and gunner's yeoman followed in 1798, then boatswain's yeoman in 1799. In the early U.S. Navy, the petty officers, who were appointed by the ship's captain, served at his pleasure. They did not retain their rank when they moved to another ship. No uniform regulations were specified for the petty officers and enlisted men until 1817.

=== World War I Era ===
With the US Declaration of War against Germany in April 1917, the Navy needed trained men quickly. Recruits who had the aptitude to be yeomen attended Yeoman School. As the war effort escalated, the US Navy found itself lacking personnel to perform the shore-based duties necessary to support more than 128,000 enlisted personnel. On 17 March 1917, Secretary of the Navy Josephus Daniels received authorization to enlist women to perform yeoman's duties. They were designated "yeoman (F)".

==== Yeoman School ====
The Yeoman School, one of the Navy's Trade Schools, had two locations: Newport in Rhode Island, and San Francisco in California. To enter Yeoman School, the recruit was required to have some prior clerical experience, be able to write legibly, and type a 200-word letter with a passing grade of 70% or better. Knowledge of stenography was desirable, but not required. "Steno" classes would be available after hours.

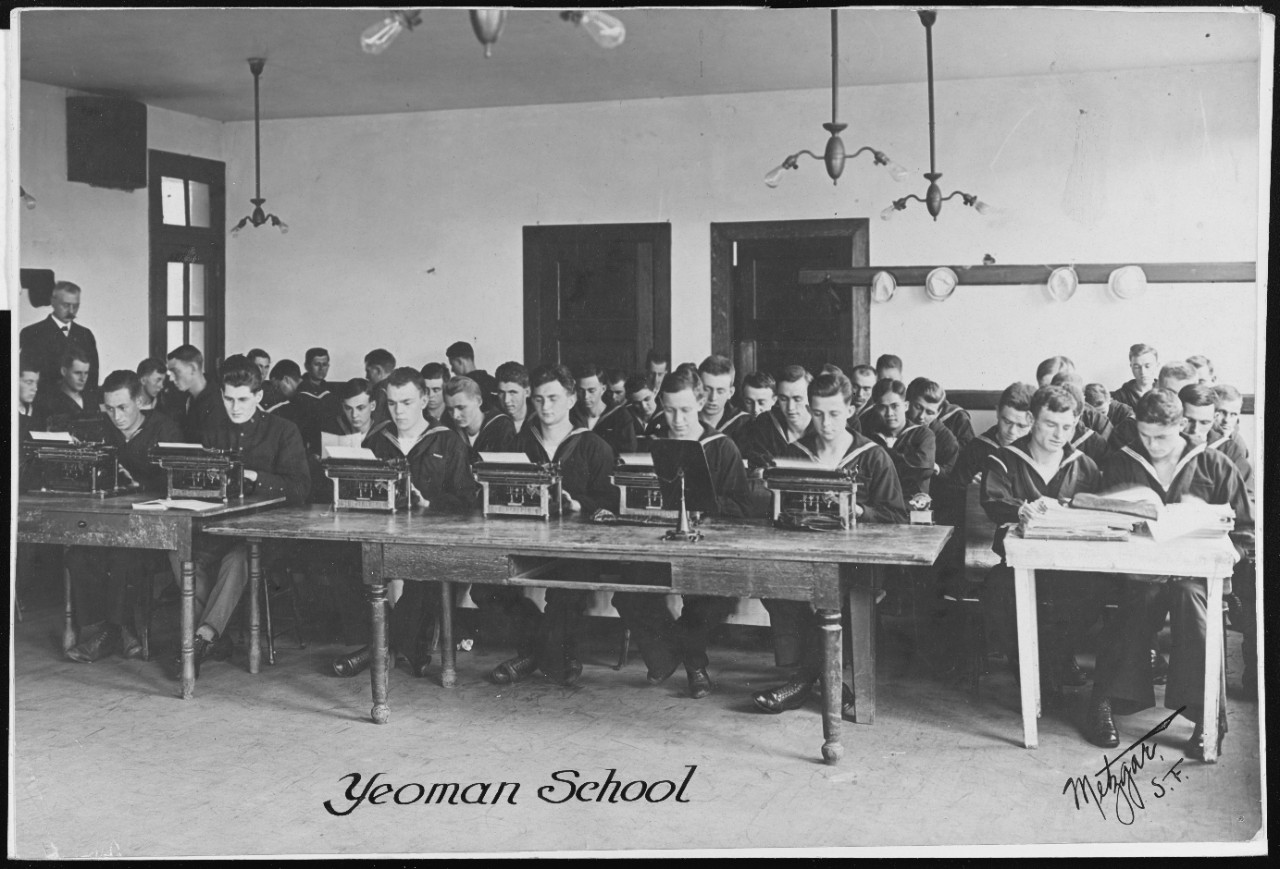
Yeoman School, New York Navy Yard c. 1910-19

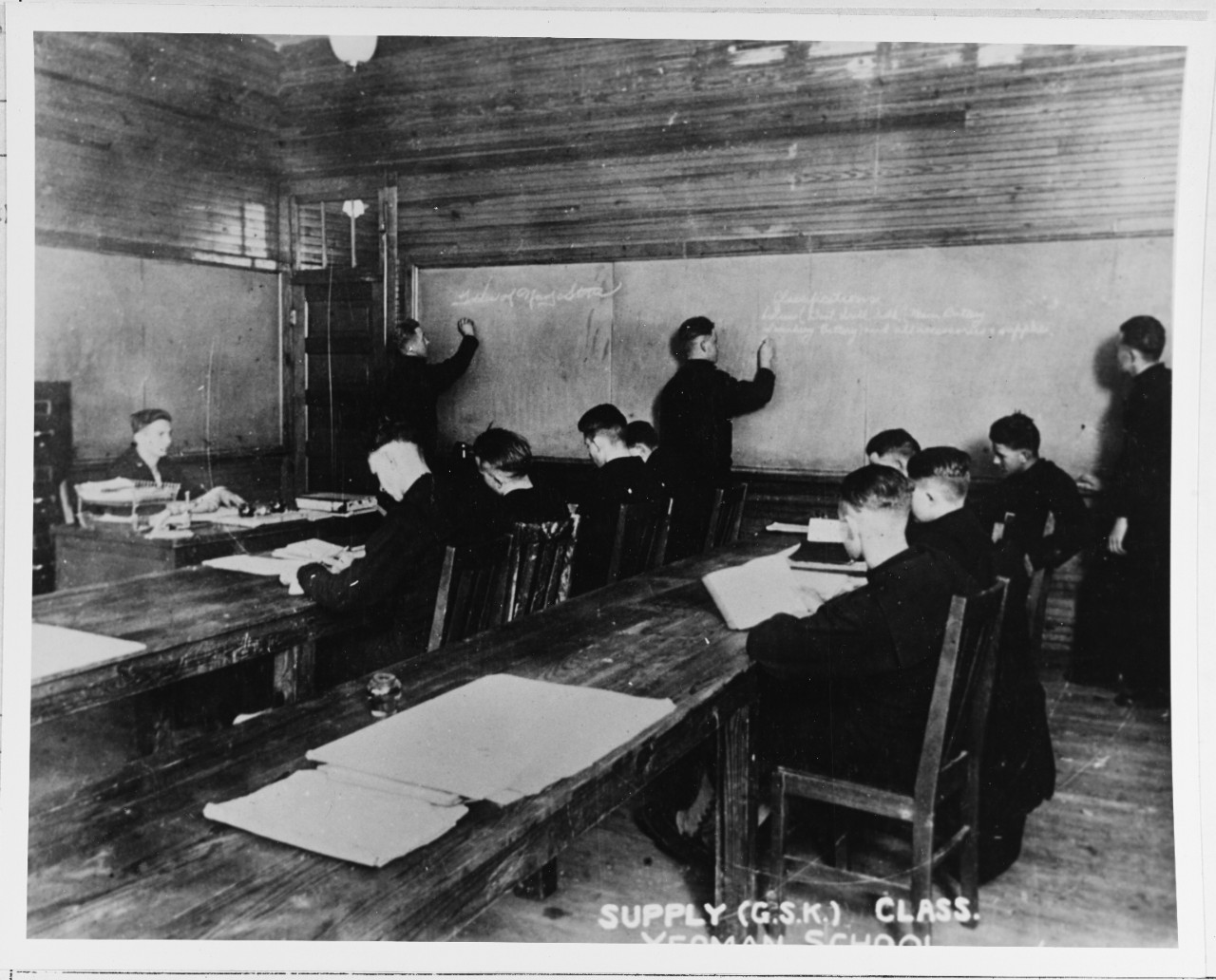
Supply class at Yeoman School, New York Navy Yard c. 1920

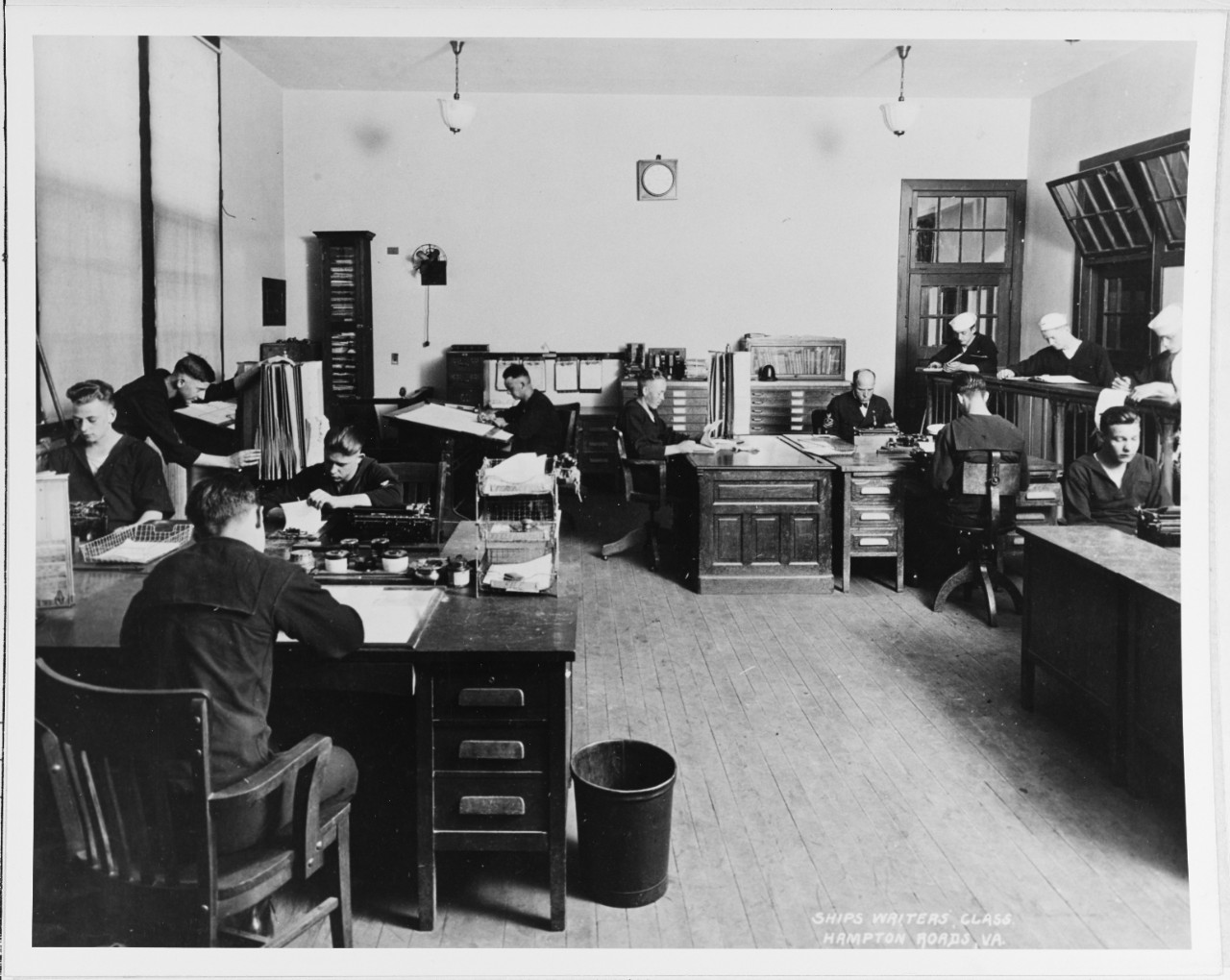
Ship's writers' class, Yeoman School, Hampton Roads NTS, VA c. 1920

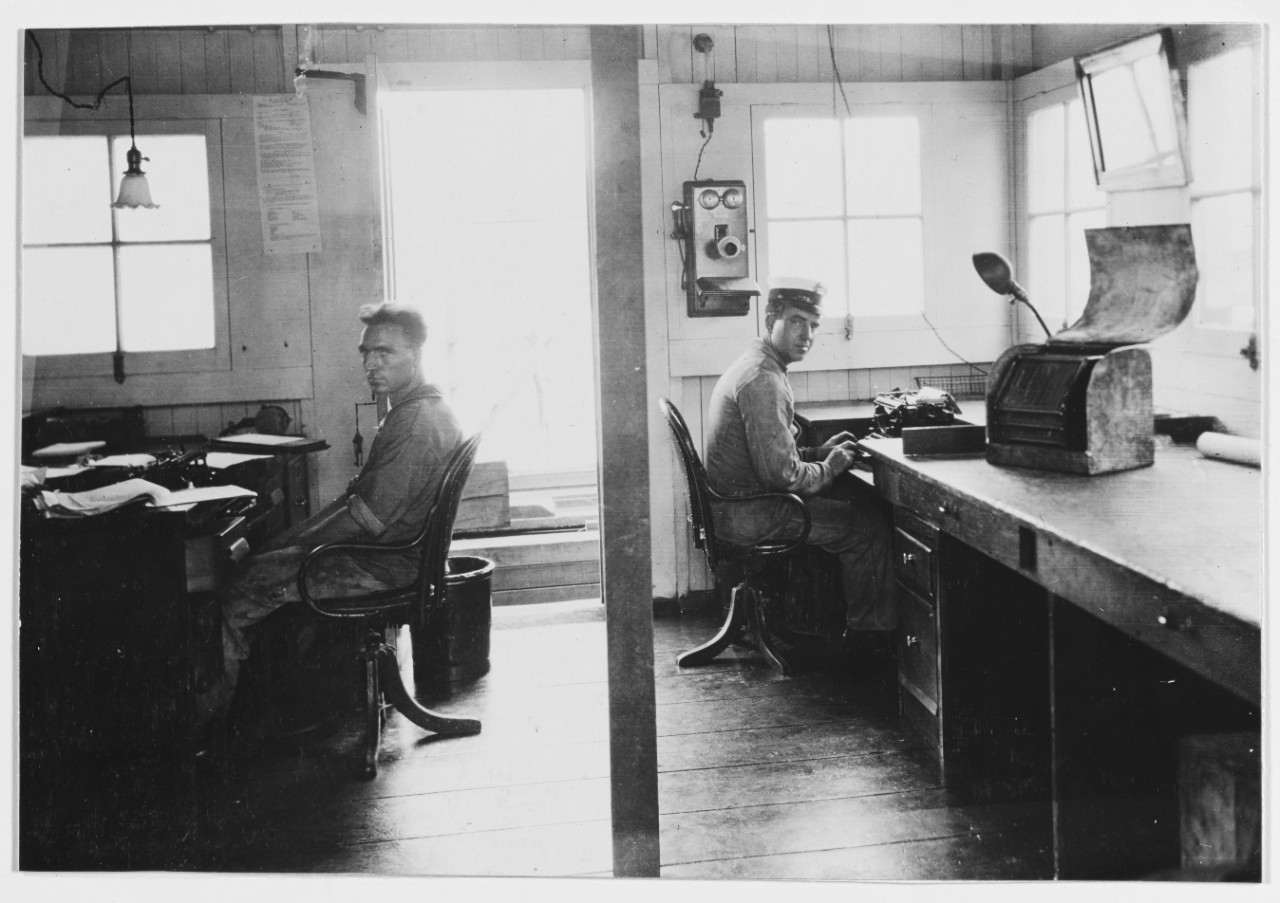
USS Prometheus, ship's repair office c. 1919-20

Preliminary classes, lasting between 4–6 weeks, would cover arithmetic, spelling, composition, and general naval knowledge. The final examination would determine eligibility for the next level of classes. Supply-officer department classes covered preparation of requisitions, surveys, public bills, official returns, and supply-related duties. General bookkeeping, inventories, mess statements, and balance sheets were also taught. Executive-officer department classes covered record-keeping for enlisted men. Correct preparation of forms for arrival/departure of men; ratings and disratings; appointments; and discharges, desertions, and death were covered. Pay-officer department classes required a thorough knowledge of arithmetic. Making up payrolls, computing pay for officers and enlisted men (including allowances, bounties, and extra pay), calculating credit and interest on payroll savings accounts, and preparing payroll checks were some of the duties covered in these classes. Commanding-officer department classes covered the production of various forms of official correspondence, such as official letters, and endorsements. The yeoman had to be familiar with the channels through which the documents would pass, as well as the approved filing systems for storing the paperwork. Generating the proceedings for courts-martial and other courts of inquiry or inquests was also covered. The use and proper care of a typewriter was extremely important in the preparation of these documents. Each of the above classes was 5 weeks long.

Upon entering Yeoman School, the recruit's ranking was landsman-for-yeoman, with a monthly salary of $17.60. Good grades and good conduct could be rewarded with a promotion to landsman-for-yeoman, second class, and a monthly salary of $20.90. Upon graduation, the ranking would be either yeoman, third class (Y3C), at $33.00 per month or yeoman, second class (Y2C), at $38.00 per month. The new yeomen would be granted 10 days leave, with additional time allowed for travel, before transferring to his next station.

==== Yeoman (F) ====
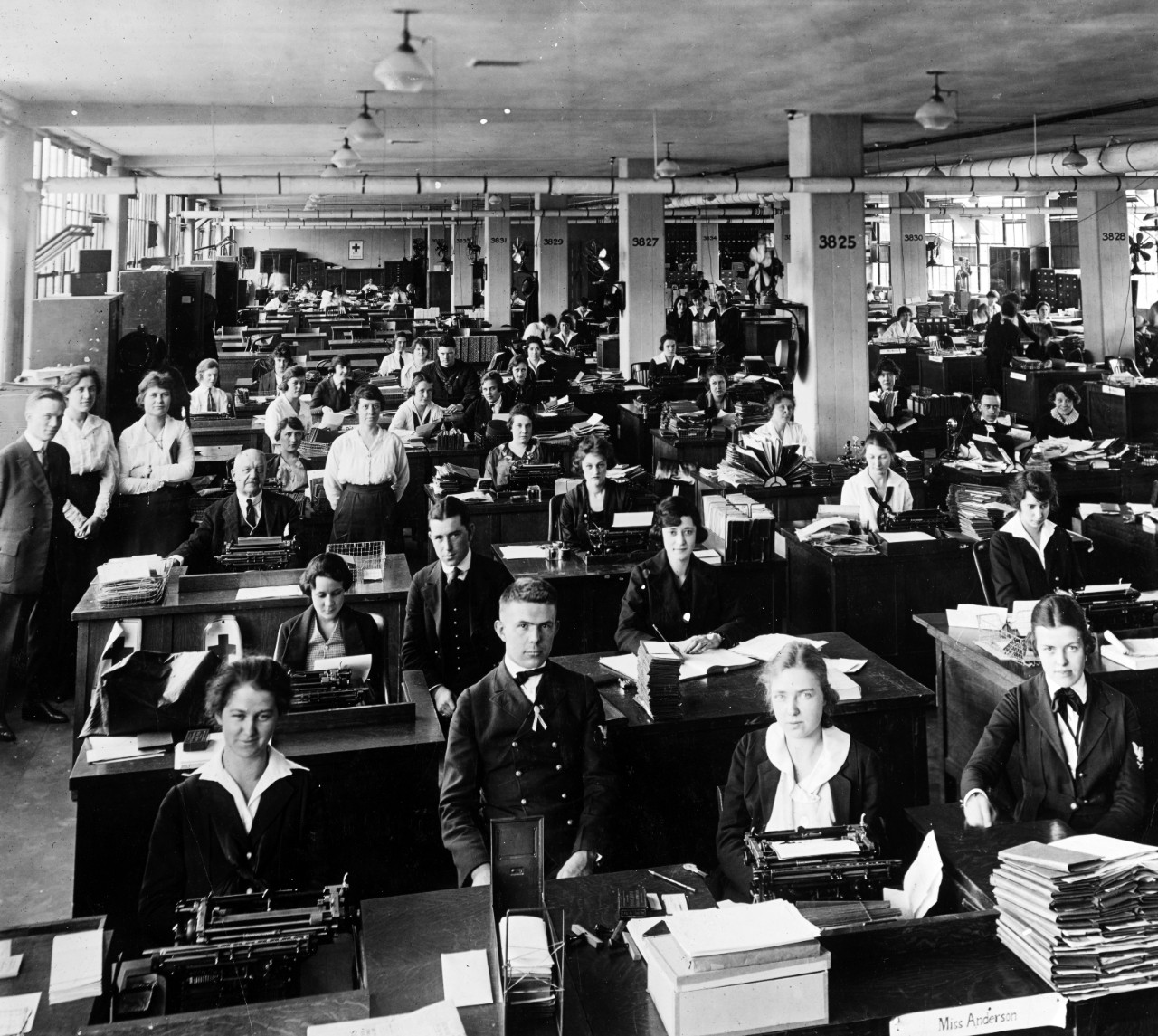
Typing pool at the Navy Department, Washington DC c. 1918–19. Typists are a mixture of yeomen (F) and civilians. Note the two male chief yeomen at the front desks.

The Civil Service Commission notified Navy Secretary Josephus Daniels in early 1917 that it could not supply the clerical support needed by the Navy. Exactly who originated the idea of enlisting women with the necessary skills is uncertain. Daniels consulted his legal staff as to whether the language of The Naval Act of 1916 prohibited women. Advised that it did not, Daniels responded, "Then enroll women in the Naval Reserve as yeomen,’ I said, ‘and we will have the best clerical assistance the country can provide.’" By war's end, there were more than 11,000 women serving as yeoman (F) of the US Naval Reserve. The women also contributed to the war effort in non-clerical positions, replacing their male counterparts who were called for sea duty. They became switchboard operators, recruiters, code decipher clerks, painters, look-outs at naval bases, translators, and messengers. They also dispersed pay, designed ship camouflage, and manufactured munitions. As Secretary Daniels had observed, “They did everything except go to sea.” Yeoman (F) recruitment stopped on 11 November 1918. The young women had enlisted for 4 years, so they remained on active duty until 1920. Afterwards, many of their supervisors urged Daniels to retain the now-discharged yeomen as civilians doing the same jobs.

==== Agnes Meyer Driscoll ====
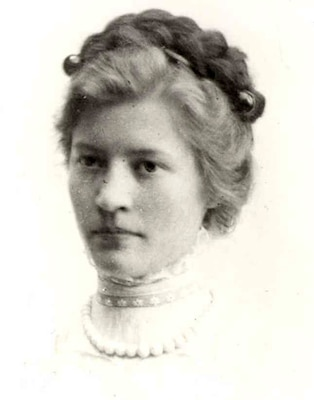
Agnes Meyer Driscoll

Agnes Meyer Driscoll graduated from Ohio State University in 1911 with a bachelor's degree in mathematics and physics. She was also proficient in four foreign languages: French, Latin, German, and Japanese. Driscoll enlisted with the US Navy as a chief yeoman (F) in 1918, and worked in the Code and Signal Section of the Director of Naval Communications. throughout WWI. After the war ended, she continued working for the US Navy as a civilian crypto-analyst. She was instrumental in breaking the Red Book Japanese naval cipher in the mid-1920s, and the Blue Book Japanese naval cipher in 1930.

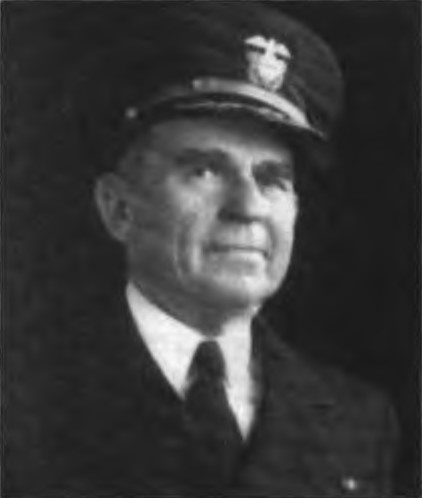
William D. Puleston

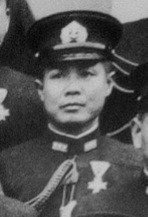
Toshio Miyazaki, before 1941

About the same time (early 1930s), William D. Puleston, Director of the Office of Naval Intelligence (ONI) suspected the naval attaché office at the Japanese Embassy in Washington D.C. of extending their espionage activities throughout the US. Suspicions of Embassy military officials and possible Japanese naval officers posing as English language students at US universities resulted in increased surveillance, and led to the expulsion of Japanese assistant naval attaché, Yoshiro Kanamoto, for photographing US Navy fuel oil depots. Further decrypted Japanese messages confirmed Director Puleston's suspicions. Driscoll was reviewing a decrypted message which contained the word 'TO-MI-MU-RA'. Unable to recognize the word, she showed the message to a Japanese language specialist. He initially suggested that the word could be a Japanese name, but Driscoll wasn't so sure. His next suggestion was the alternate reading of 'MU-RA': "son", thus making the entire word mean "Tomison", or "Thompson" in English. The ONI had a lead to an American possibly spying for the Japanese.

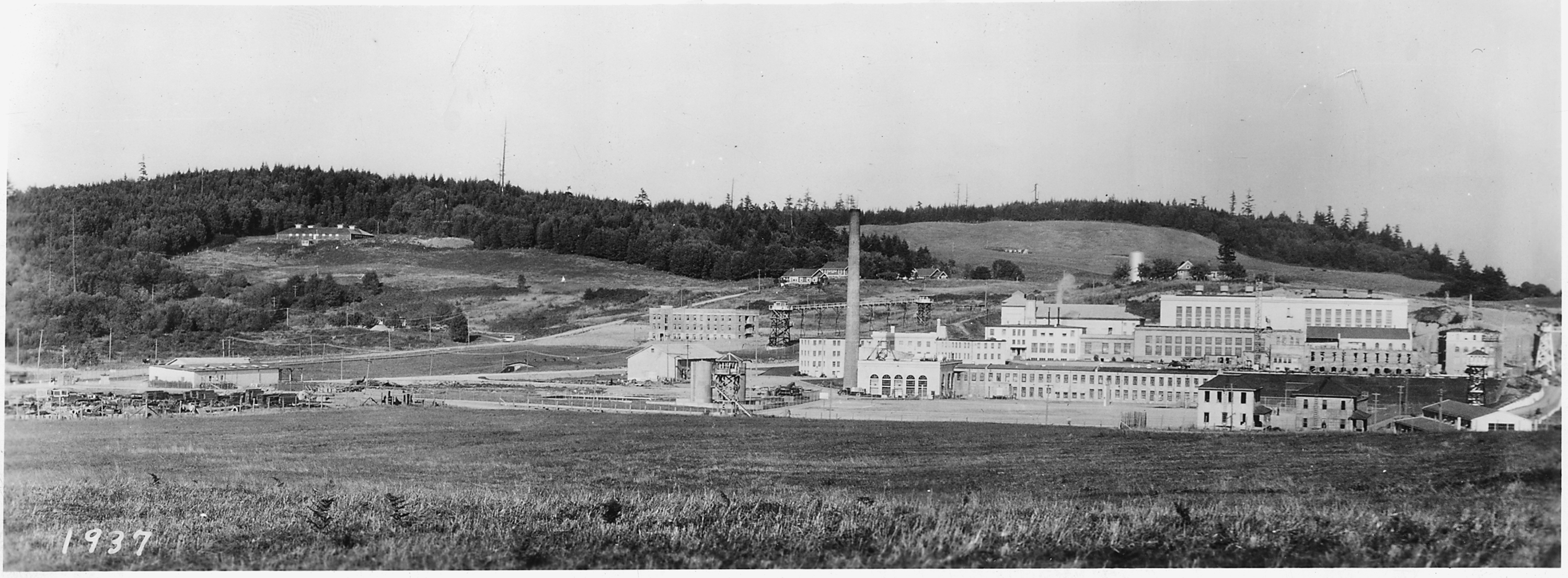
McNeil Island Federal Penitentiary, Puget Sound, Washington, 1937

Over on the West Coast of the mainland US, Harry J. Thompson was a former US Navy yeoman, and now jobless. In 1934, Thompson had been recruited by Lt Cmdr Toshio Miyazaki of the Imperial Japanese Navy. Miyazaki was posing as Mr. Tanni, an English language exchange student at Stanford University. Thompson was given the uniform of a chief yeoman and was able to access classified information on gunnery and gunnery tactics. While drunk, Thompson confided to his roommate, Willard James Turrentine, also unemployed, about the spy ring. Turrentine informed the ONI, passing along some of Thompson's correspondence as proof. The Federal Bureau of Investigation (FBI) placed Thompson under surveillance, and arrested him in March 1936 under the Espionage Act of 1917. Thompson was convicted, and sentenced to 15 years at McNeil Island Federal Penitentiary. On the day Thompson was arrested, Miyazaki fled back to Japan.

=== World War II era ===
The duties of the navy yeomen aboard a battleship during World War II are remembered by the living historians of the USS North Carolina, now a museum ship in Wilmington, North Carolina. There were ten yeomen of the executive division of the executive department. The executive department was responsible for all duties on the ship except for those performed by the gunnery and navigation departments. It contained divisions responsible for supply, medical, engineering, security, and the executive functions aboard ship. The yeoman staff included: Chief yeoman (also known as the ship's writer), one yeoman 1st class, three yeoman 2nd class, two yeoman 3rd class, and three seamen who were learning on the job to become yeomen (known as "strikers").

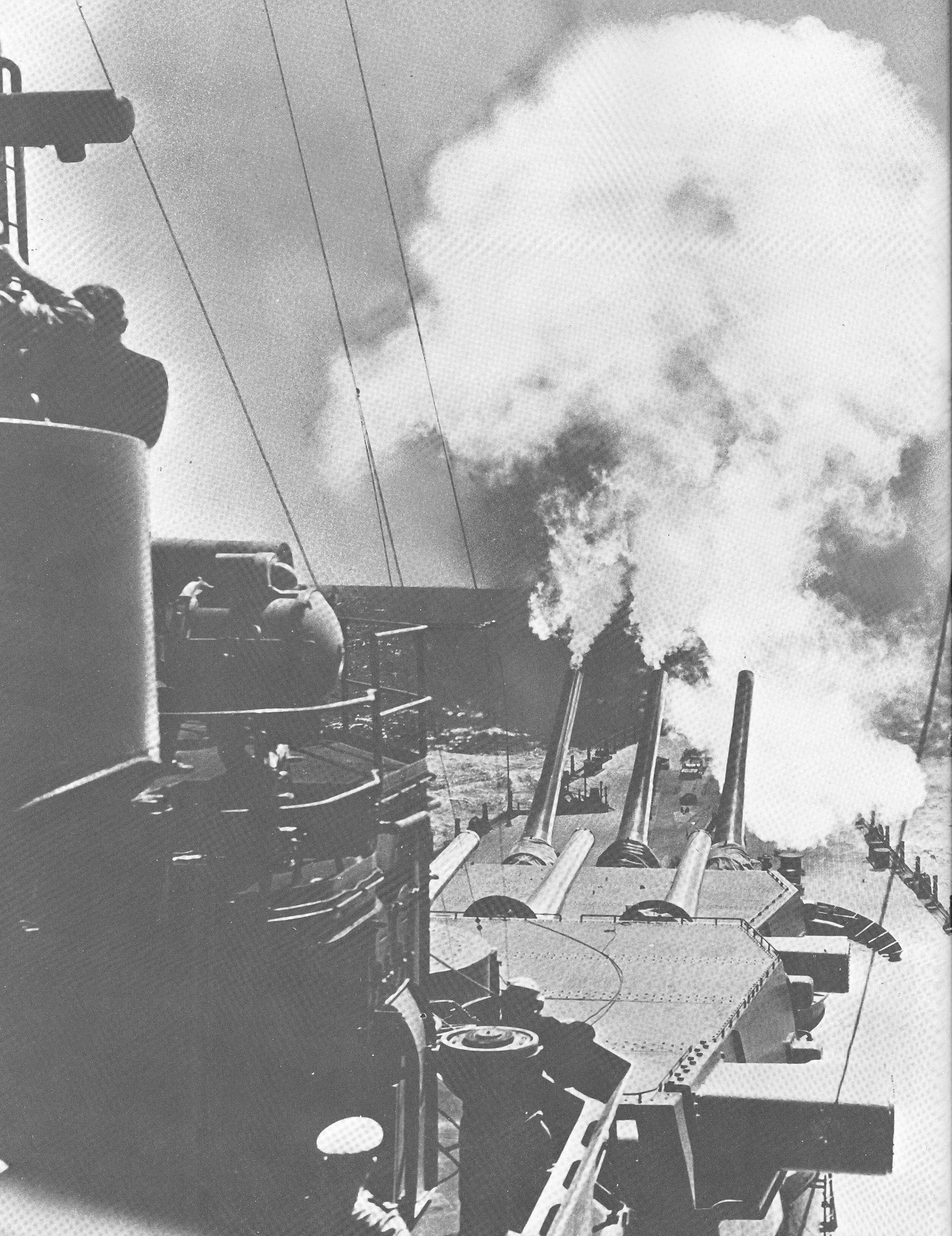
USS North Carolina (BB-55) turret 1 fires all three guns at maximum elevation directly over the bow. In this view, turret 2 is immediately behind turret 1.

North Carolina was a combat vessel. Therefore, besides the traditional duties of a yeoman "paper-pusher", the yeomen had battle stations to report to when General Quarters was sounded. They were:

Secondary battle plot (battle recorder)
Auxiliary CIC (3JW phone circuit talker)
Turret 2 booth (phone talker)
Damage control station (X1JV phone circuit talker)
Repair 1 (forward) (fire party & traffic control, valveman)
Repair 2 (aft) (fire party)
Repair 3 (chief in charge, fire party, valveman & fire party)
Conning tower (3J2 phone circuit talker, JA phone circuit talker)
Battle II (JA phone circuit talker, JL phone circuit talker)
Central station and forward gyro (JA phone circuit talker)

Note that duties of battle recorder and the various circuit talkers (who relayed orders over the shipboard telephone system) required the attention to detail that was part of the yeoman training. That a yeoman was in charge of the repair parties made use of his organizational skills.

Another aspect of the yeoman's duties was highlighted during the Court of Inquiry convened in August 1945 to investigate the loss of the USS Indianapolis. Part of the Judge Advocate's legal staff were yeomen court reporters; in the modern US Navy this duty is performed by legalmen.

==== Indiana University Bloomington ====
Indiana University Bloomington (IUB) has been teaching military science since just after the US Civil War. During World War I (WWI), a US Army Reserve Officer Training Corps (ROTC) was established under the Department of Military Science and Tactics, and IU women graduates became yeomen (F). The 7 December 1941 attack on Pearl Harbor galvanized the university administration (some of whom were WWI veterans) and the student body. On Tuesday, 9 December, the student newspaper, Indiana Daily Student, ran an editorial in response to President Franklin Roosevelt's message to Congress on the previous day:

Now we have a job to do. Each citizen has a job: each state has its job, and we on the campus of Indiana University have a job. Our first task must be to keep a clear, level head in the midst of intellectual hysteria that can so easily sweep the country. A university campus is the first place that this objective thinking should be prominent in the settlement of the many problems that now confront us ... We do not want to act in a way that our opportunities to aid mankind in the future will be jeopardized. We must continue to plan for the things that lie beyond this chaotic valley that the world is in now. We are fighting for freedom and democracy now and we want to be prepared to administer it when the war is over. Between 7–14 January 1942, a committee of administrators, professors, and one student outlined a plan of change to put IUB on a war footing to support the war effort. They adopted a three-semester academic plan to condense a 4-year program into two years and nine months. They also established an organization, the "Junior Division", to help high school graduates make the university transition more easily.

The Naval Training Station at IUB was first considered in 1940, when administrators saw the success of the NROTC (Naval Reserve Officer Training Corps) program at Northwestern University. The US Navy saw the School of Business at IUB as perfect for a Yeoman School. Incorporating NROTC into the university's curriculum meant including Naval V-1 training, a US Naval Reserve Accredited College Program and Naval ROTC. In July 1942, the first class of yeoman recruits arrived for four months of training. Naval instruction occupied 35 classrooms, with 5–6 hours of intense training per day. Course subjects included: general storekeeping, disbursement, provisions, clothing and small stores, aviation, typewriting, spelling, English grammar, and correspondence. By mid-July, the campus began to assume a nautical flavor. The three buildings of the Men's Residence Center, where the yeoman recruits were housed, began to be referred to as "vessels", the student rooms became "cabins", the campus became the "good ship Indiana University" or the "USS Indiana", and Bloomington was the "shore". The Navy students had their own campus newspapers, The Quill and The Yeoman.

During the late fall of 1942, the Navy WAVES began to replace the male sailors. By January 1943, the naval student population was evenly split between men and women. In May, the last of the men were graduated, and the Navy school became exclusively women. The US Coast Guard SPARS arrived in June, followed by the USMCWR (US Marine Corps Women's Reserve). By the fall of 1943, the number of graduates began to exceed the number being assigned to stations. The Naval Training Station was closed on 30 June 1944. The "good ship Indiana University" had trained over 5000 men and women for the US Navy.

==== WAVES ====
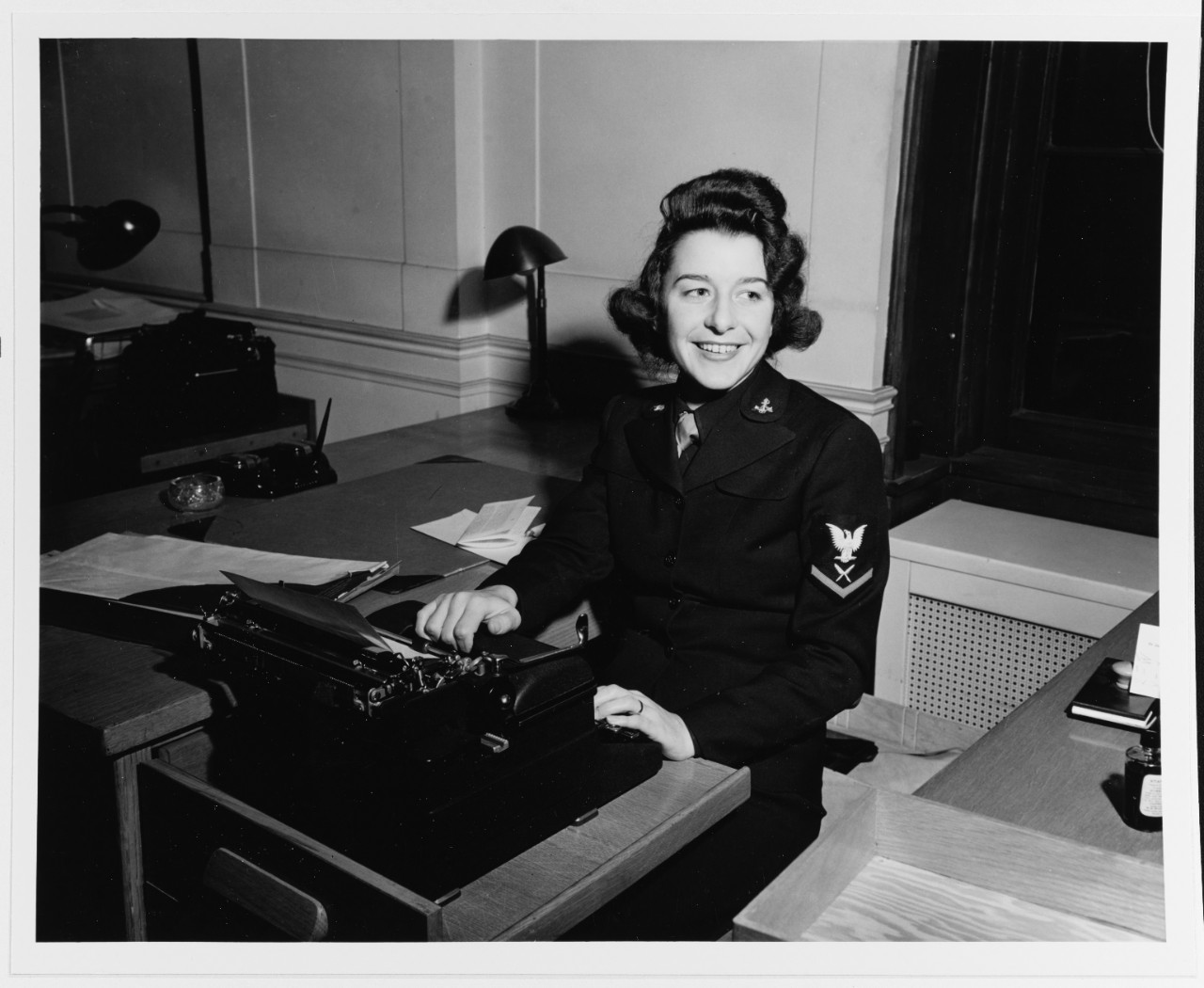
Y3c Mary Lyons on duty at Navy Headquarters, Church Street, New York City

The US Naval Reserve (Women's Reserve), more commonly known as the WAVES (Women Accepted for Volunteer Emergency Service), was established by the US Congress on 21 July 1942. Women would be accepted into the Naval Reserve for the duration of the war, plus six months. Both commissioned officers and enlisted personnel were recruited. The enlisted WAVES performed mostly clerical and storekeeping duties onshore, allowing their male counterparts to be reassigned to sea duties. Other enlisted WAVES performed support duties such as aviation mechanists or metalsmiths, parachute riggers, control tower operators, and radio operators.(2001 Goodson) On the second anniversary of the WAVES (not long after the Normandy invasion), President Franklin Roosevelt noted in a speech:

"history will record that the WAVES fulfilled a great purpose. In 500 shore establishments of the fleet, women in uniform took over the work of Navy men. They released enough of them from noncombatant duty to man all our landing craft in two important operations: the Normandy landing on June 6 and the Invasion of Saipan on June 15. The Women’s Reserve will continue to speed the victory day by efficient performance of vital duties ashore."

===== Iowa State Teacher's College =====
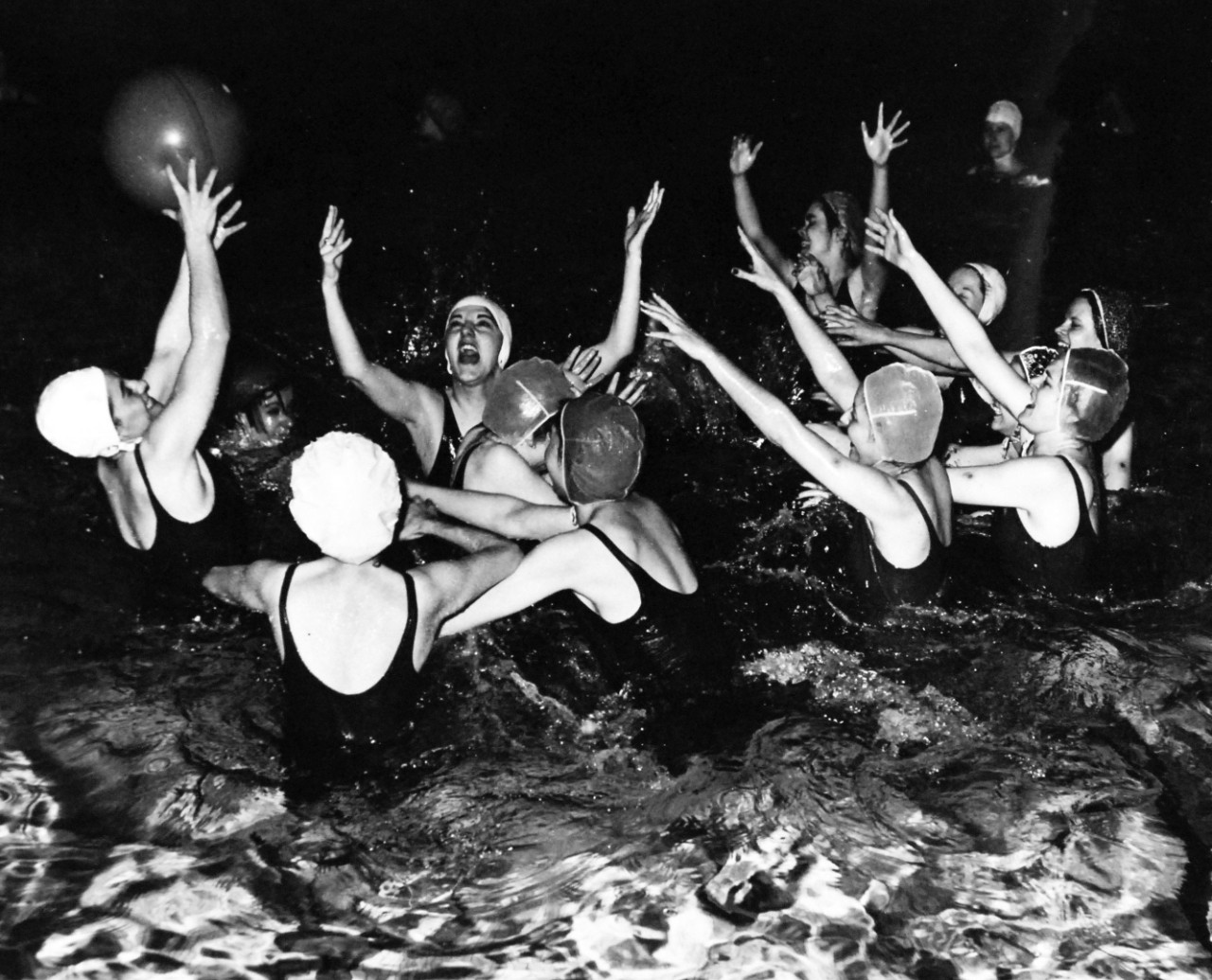
Water polo at ISTC Boot Camp, February 1943

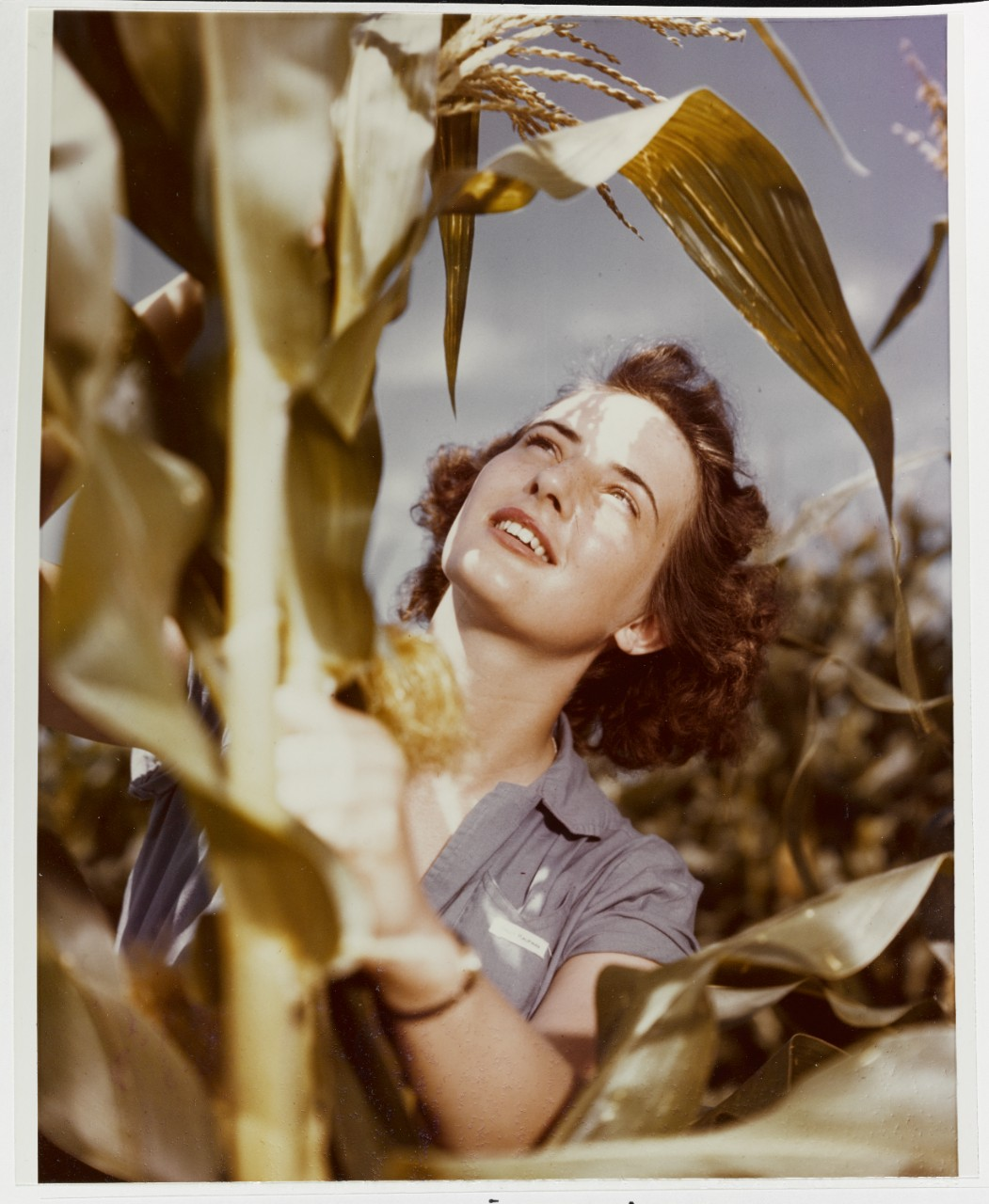
WAVE de-tasseling the corn stalk, 1944

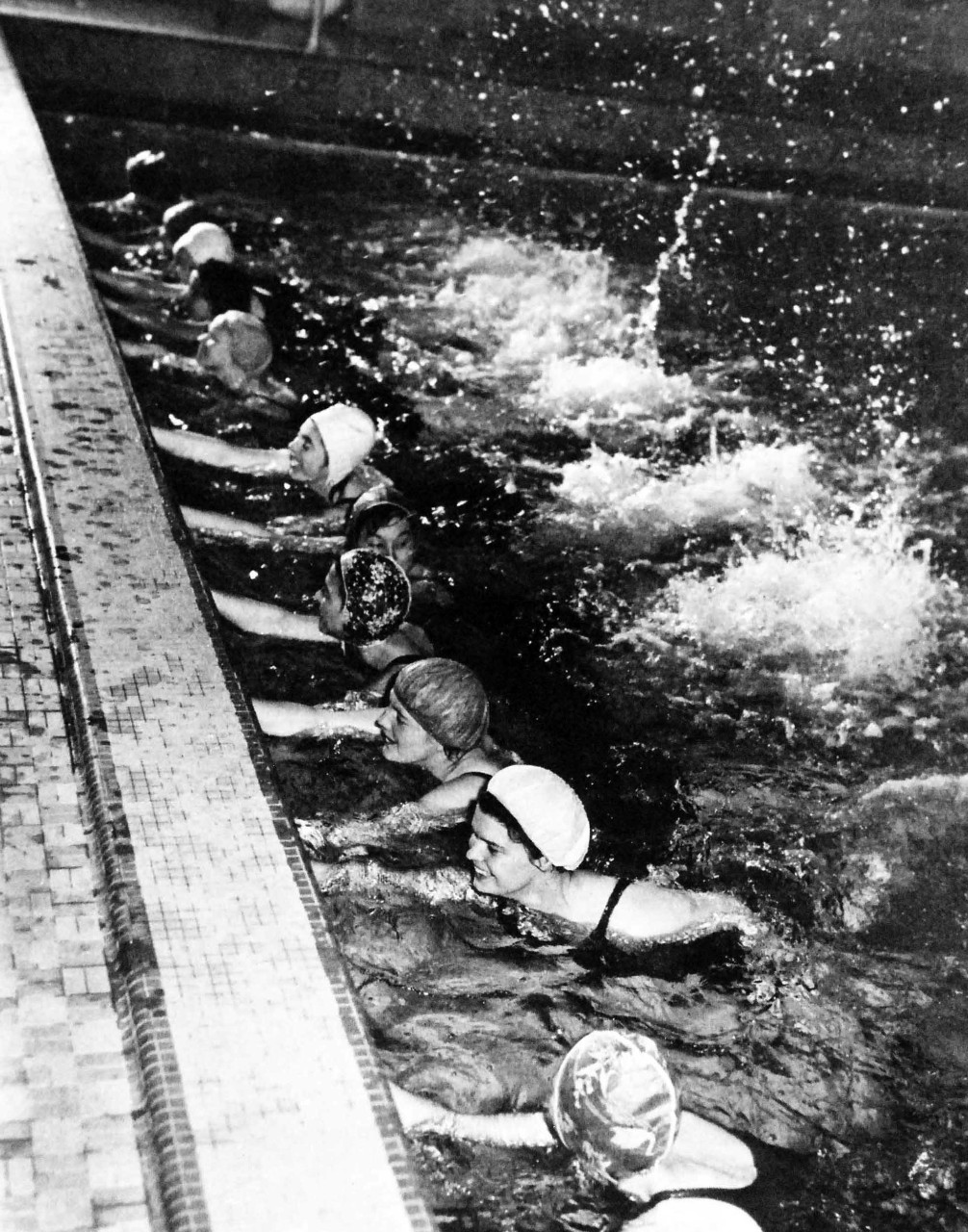
Swimming lessons at ISTC Boot Camp, February 1943

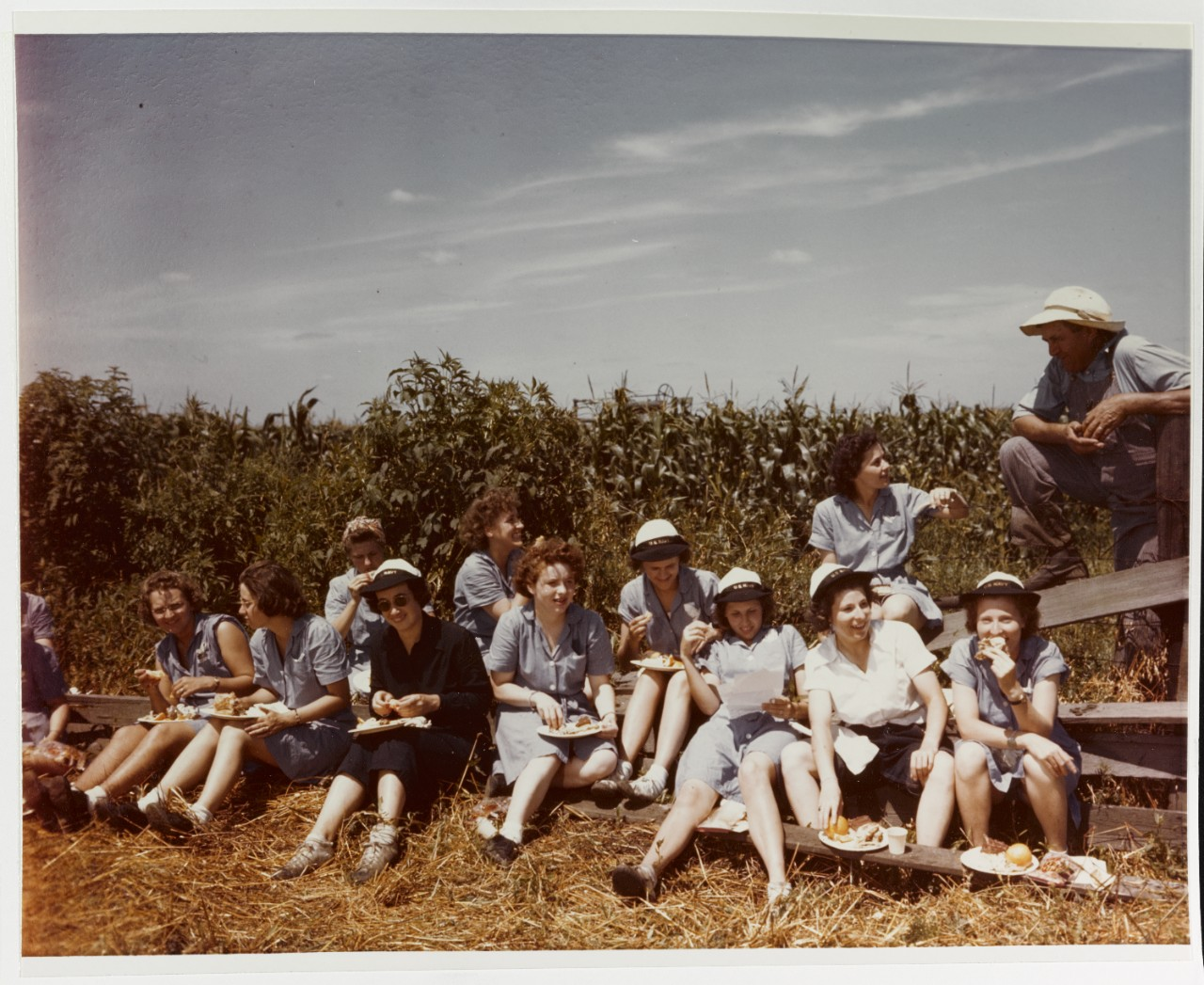
Lunch break in the corn field, 1944

Located at Cedar Falls, Iowa, and now part of the University of Northern Iowa, the Iowa State Teacher's College (ISTC) was one of the first basic training facilities for the WAVES recruits. The first class of 1500 WAVE recruits arrived in December 1942 for intensive introductory training lasting 5–6 weeks. Due to the brutal winter weather in the Central Plains of the continental US, physical training for the recruits consisted of indoor activities, such as calisthenics, swimming, and other water sports, such as water polo.

Initially, the Navy combined naval training with job training at "indoctrination schools", which proved to be a mistake. The amount of material covered in classes was massive. The Sextant, the blog of the Naval History and Heritage Command (NHHC), quoted Jacqueline Van Voris (an instrumented flying instructor for Navy pilots between 1944 and 1946) in her unpublished manuscript: "New recruits were warned that one midshipman dropped her pencil during a history lecture and while she was picking it up missed all of the naval battles of the civil war". The Navy also encountered problems with having several indoctrination schools in various locations across the country, so it separated job training as dedicated courses, and consolidated WAVES basic training at Hunter College, The Bronx, New York City. In April 1943, the Yeoman School replaced the indoctrination school at ISTC. The Yeoman School remained in operation until April 1945. By that time, ISTC had graduated 14,000 WAVES.

Some of the WAVES recruits celebrated the second anniversary of their organization by de-tasseling seed corn at Reinbeck, Iowa. The WAVES were given permission to spend their liberty hours on two weekends (29-30 July and 5–6 August 1944) as farm emergency workers. They relieved the 14- and 15-year old workers who de-tasseled during the week. Available truck transport limited the number of WAVES volunteers to about 150. A representative of a corn seed company presented a color slide program explaining the life cycle of the corn plant and why de-tasseling is important for production of high-quality seed corn. The sight of WAVES working in the corn fields attracted both the local citizenry as well as the newsreel cameramen. (2015 Krein, p 60–1)

===== Hunter College (Basic Training) =====
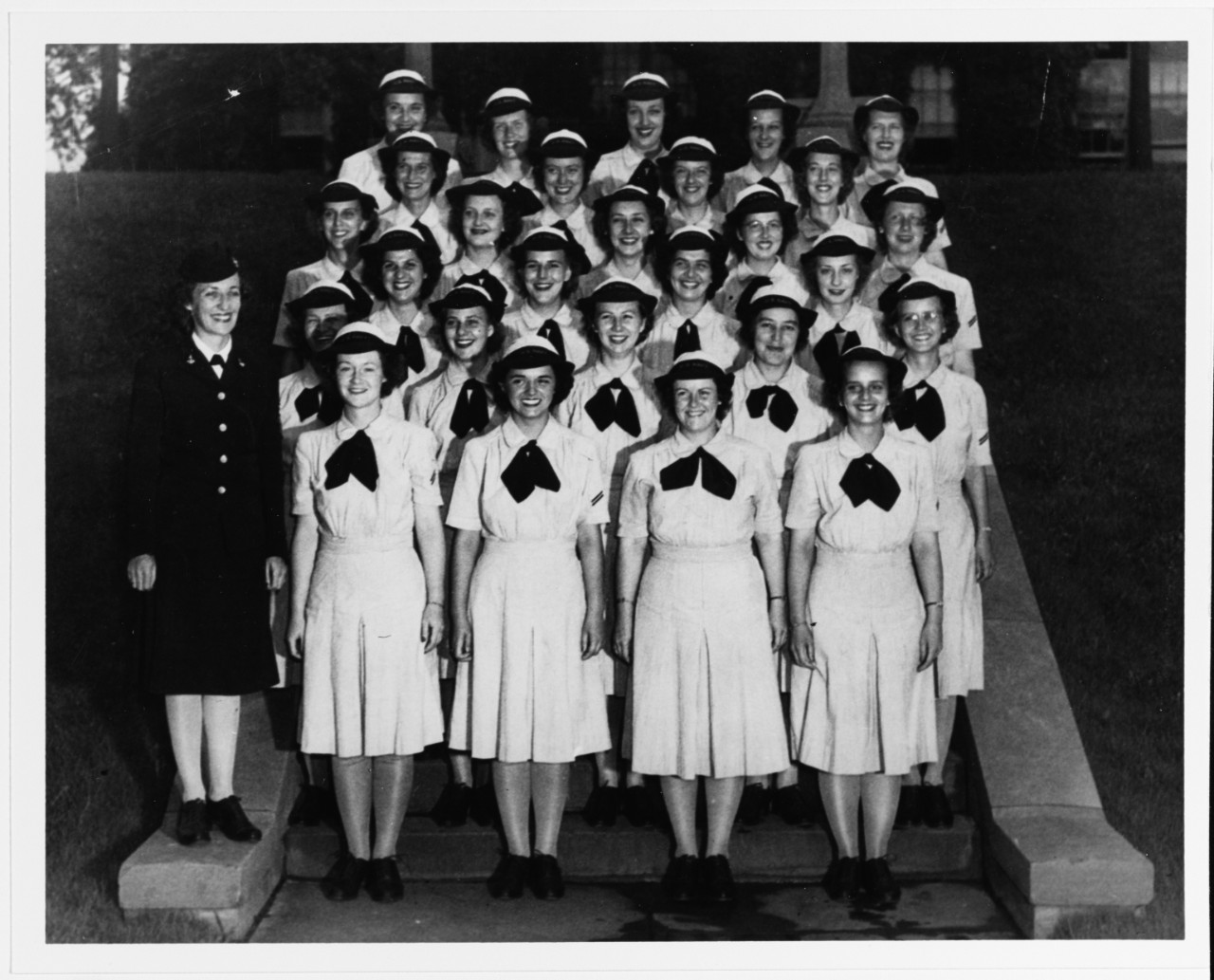
NH 91527 - WAVE yeoman class graduates, Hunter College, The Bronx, New York City, 1943

Beginning in February 1943, most enlisted recruits received their basic training at Hunter College, in the Bronx, New York City, which became known as "USS Hunter". The US Marine and US Coast Guard women recruits also received basic training here.(See USMCWR and #SPARS below.) Boot camp for the WAVES recruits was a six-week program, similar in emphasis and content to the male version.(2001 Goodson) Physical fitness was stressed, with classroom instruction in Navy ranks and ratings, naval history, tradition and customs, courtesy, discipline, and the organization of the fleets.(Hancock) The first class contained 1,993 graduates. From then on, every two weeks, Hunter College would enroll another class numbering between 1,600 and 1,700 WAVES. By the end of WWII, about 81,000 WAVES were trained at Hunter College.

An interesting episode centered around the mess hall at Hunter College according to Van Voris as quoted in The Sextant. The cafeteria staff prepared and served about 15,000 meals every day for the WAVES. At the male boot camps, the recruits were allotted 23 minutes, while the female recruits tended to take a bit longer. Furthermore, while the men would grumble about the chow, the women immediately and loudly complained about the menu. As the number of WAVE recruits assigned to galley duty increased, the quality of the food also increased. By August 1943, a school for cooks and bakers was established. After that, Hunter College became known for its good food, strong coffee, and fresh baked bread.

===== Georgia State College for Women =====
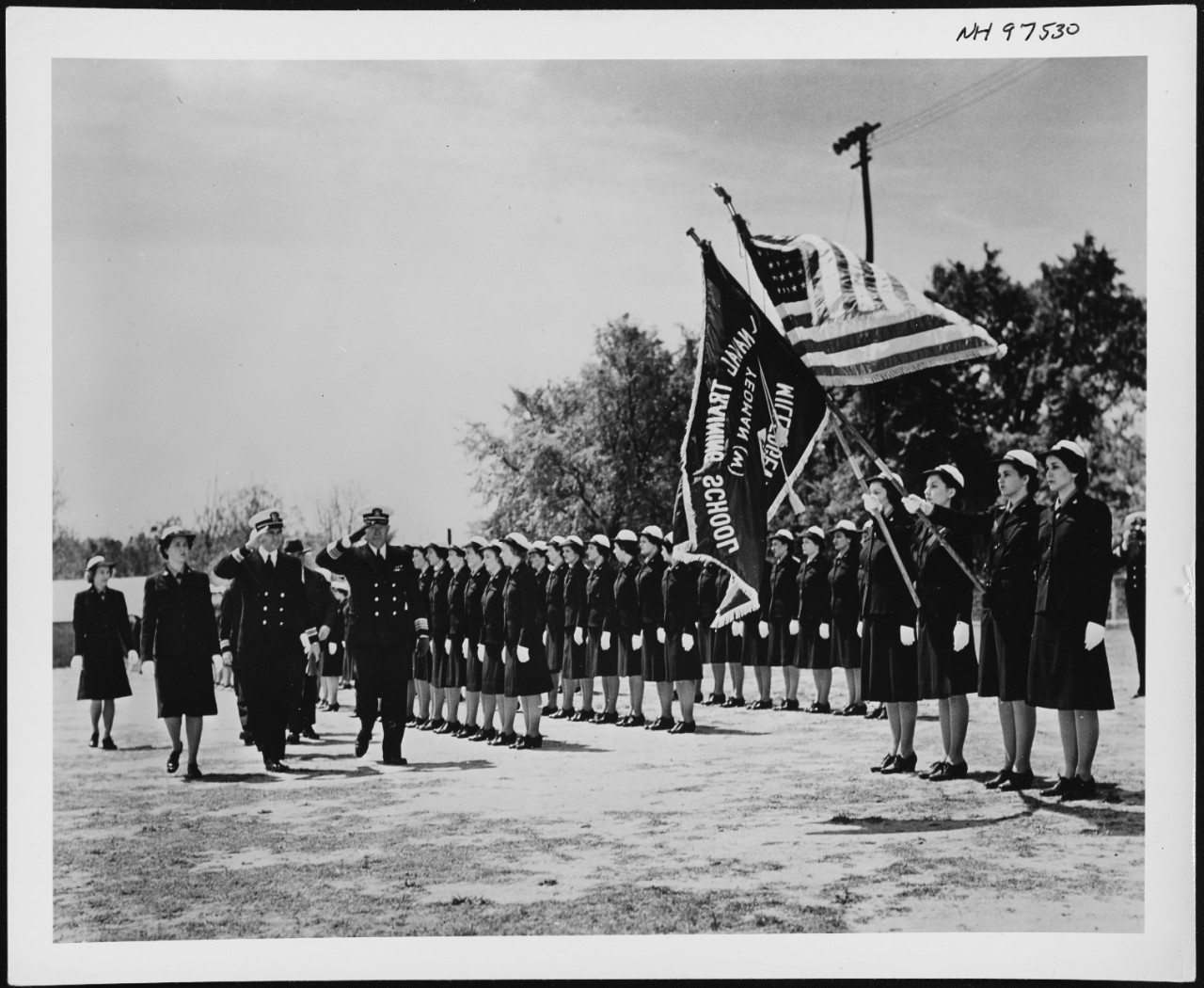
Graduation Review at Naval Training School, Milledgeville, GA, April 1943

Georgia State College for Women, in Milledgeville, Georgia (now part of Georgia College & State University) was the location of the Naval Training School (Storekeepers - W). The school was opened in 1943, and over 15,000 WAVES attended by the war's end. Most graduates were assigned to stations within the continental US, until an act of Congress permitted WAVES to serve in Alaska and Hawaii, which were US territories at the time. In a 2019 interview with the Union-Recorder of Milledgeville, Georgia College historian Robert Wilson recalled how the WAVES students, marching in formation through the campus and small town from sunup to sundown, disturbed the tranquility of the formerly genteel upper-class southern women's college. The WAVES were housed separately from the main student body (known as "Jessies"). The 1945 yearbook staff, on its introductory page to the military students, wrote:

"Some in our midst are dressed in Navy blue. They are just like the rest of us, only farther away from home, and sometimes more homesick, even though they proudly wear one of Uncle Sam’s uniforms. Long after they’re gone we’ll still remember their cheerful singing as they march through the rain, the little short girl on the end of the platoon running to keep up, those jaunty salutes, their frequent and impressive graduations, and the smiling ‘Hi’ in reply to our ‘Hey.’"

Wilson also recalled another time in May 1943, when Bob Hope and his USO troupe stopped at Georgia College to entertain the WAVES with a show that would be broadcast throughout the country. So many townspeople lined up to see the show that Hope and his troupe repeated the performance later that evening just for them. The Special Collections of the Ina Dillard Russell Library houses the WAVES uniforms of 2 Milledgeville residents: Dr. Barbara Chandler and Harriet Kidd.

==== Gallery ====
Yeomen of the World War II era
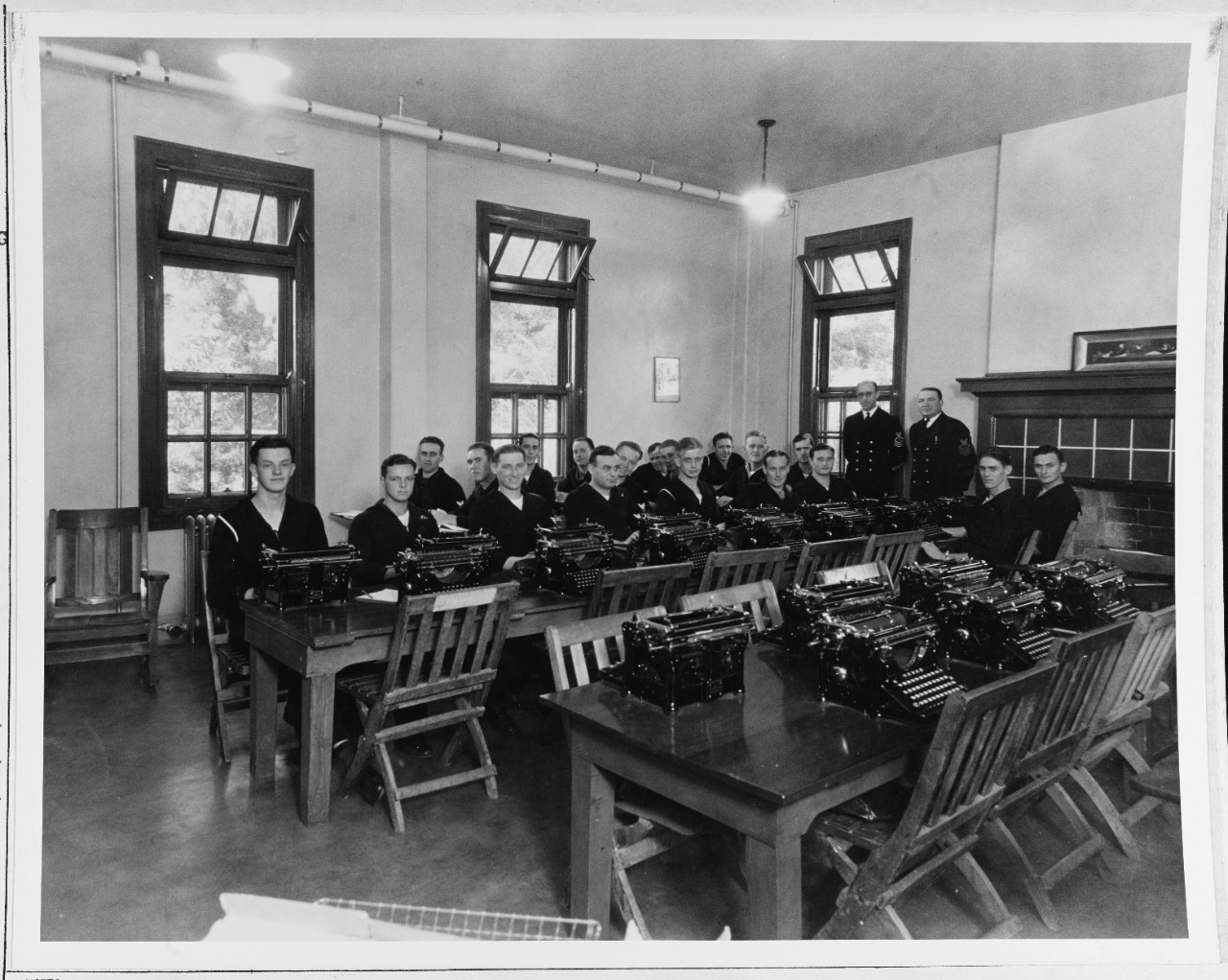
Yeoman typing class, San Diego Naval Training Center, CA, 1934.

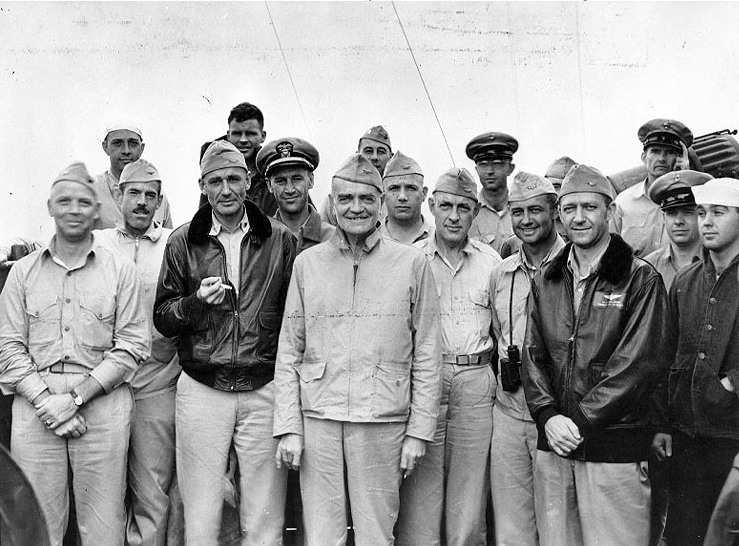
VADM William F. Halsey with members of his staff, c. 1941-42. His yeomen are at the far right: (from right to left) Yeoman I.N. Bowman; CY H.C. Carroll; and CY P.T. Hunt.

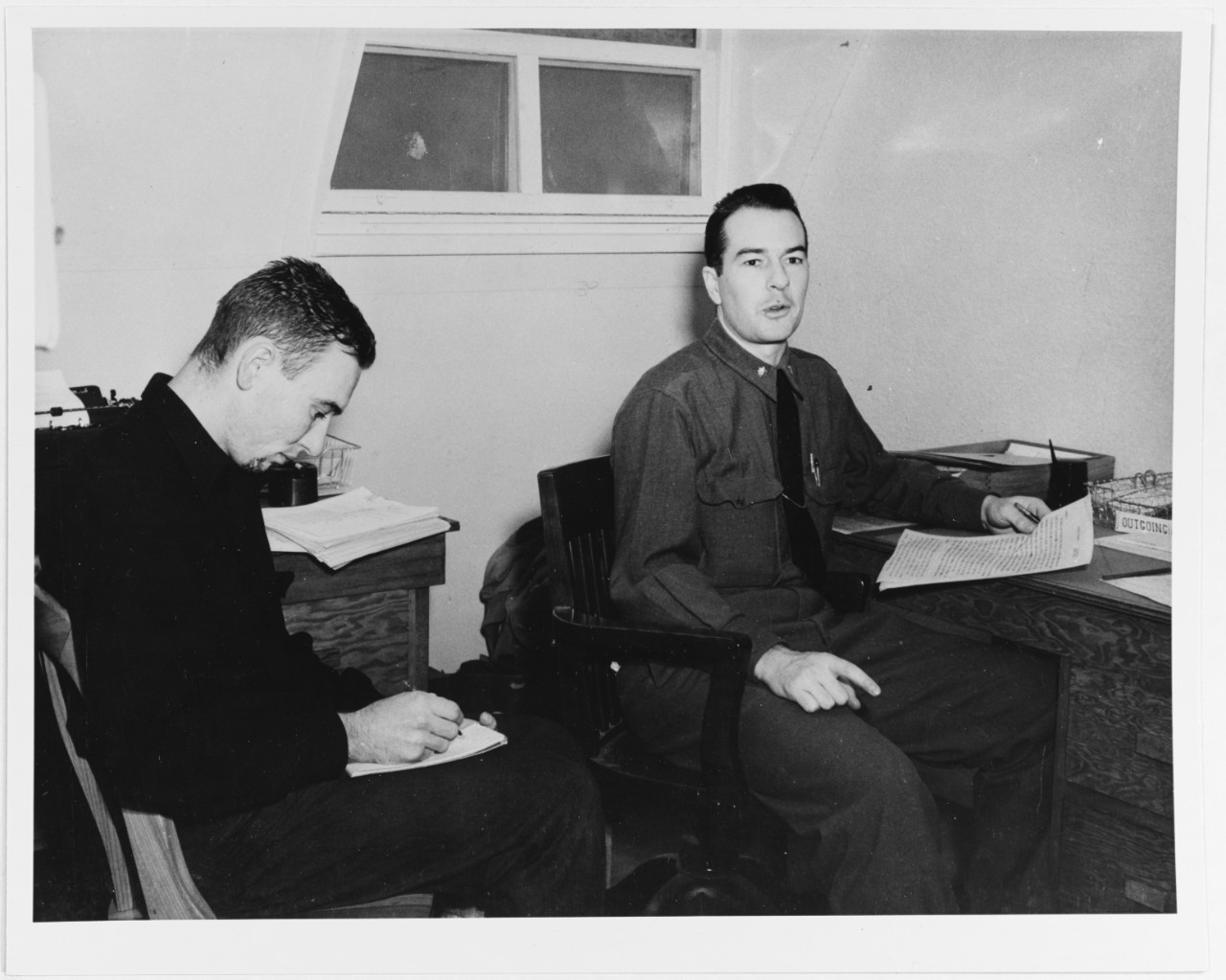
Y3c C. S. Foley (left) taking dictation from LCDR William P. Mack, NAS Adak, AK, 1943.

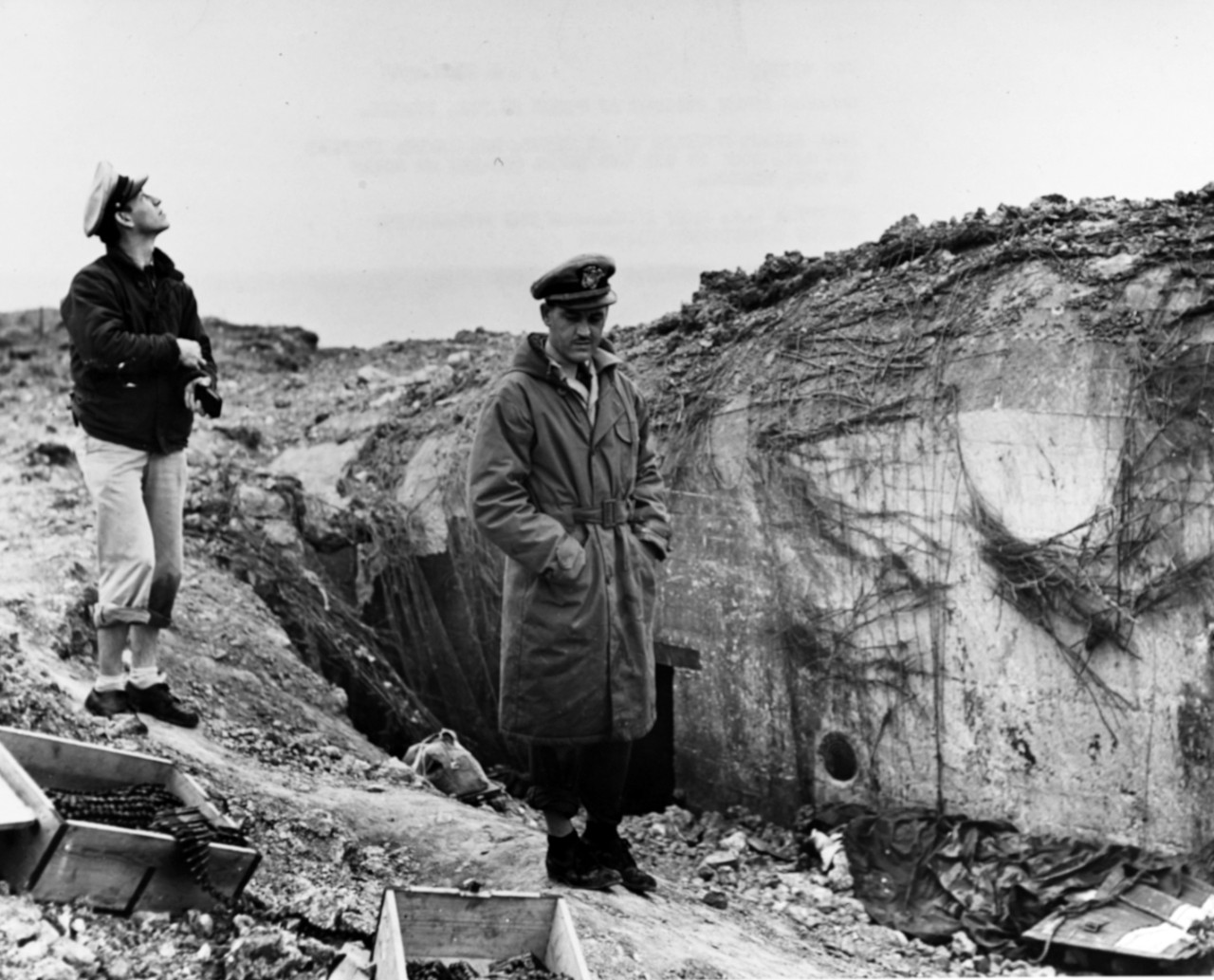
CY Cook (left) and LCDR Knapper of USS Texas (BB-35) inspecting bombardment damage, Pointe du Hoc, France, 1944.

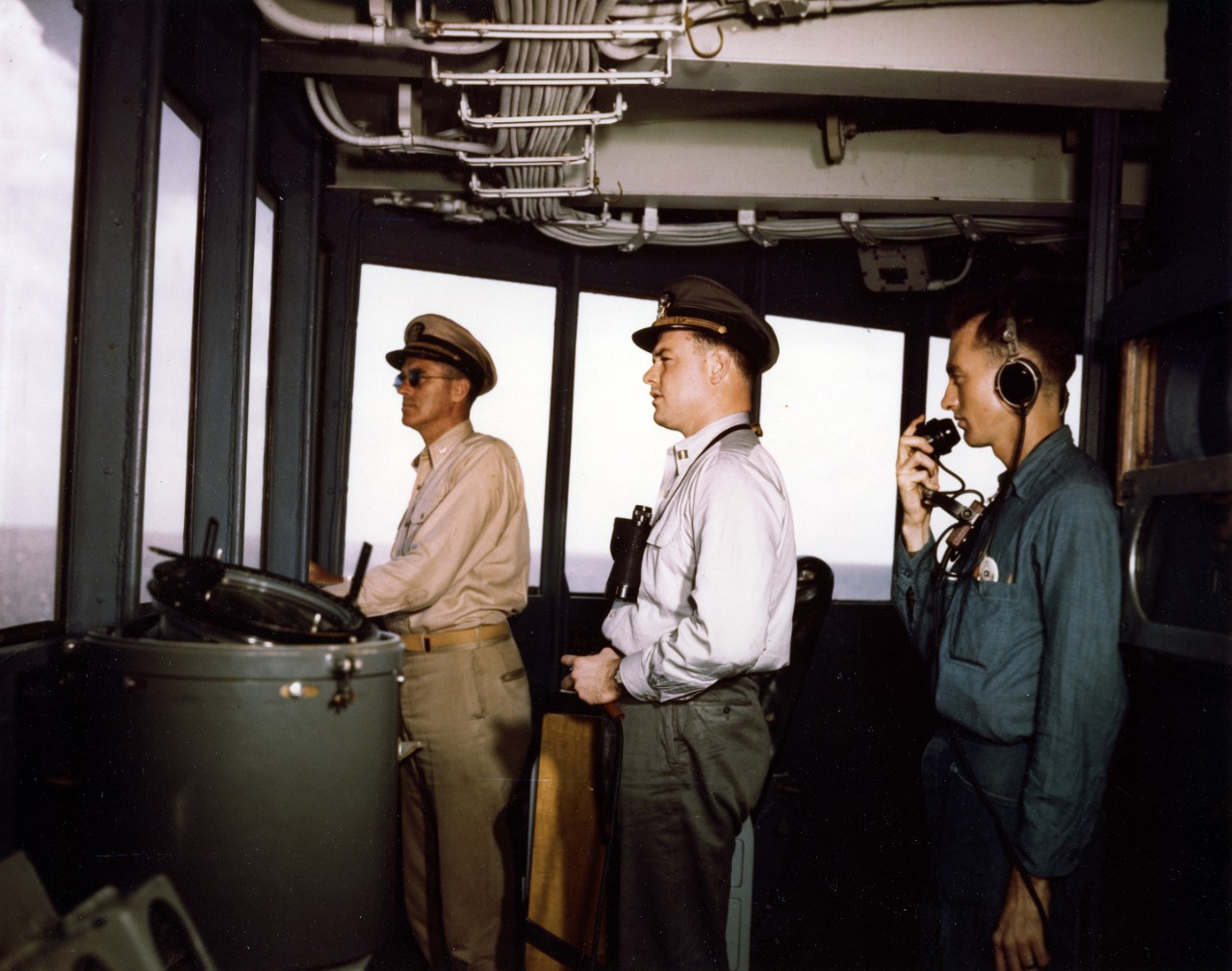
Bridge watch, USS Missouri (BB-63) shakedown cruise, 1944. Y1c Arthur Colton is at right.

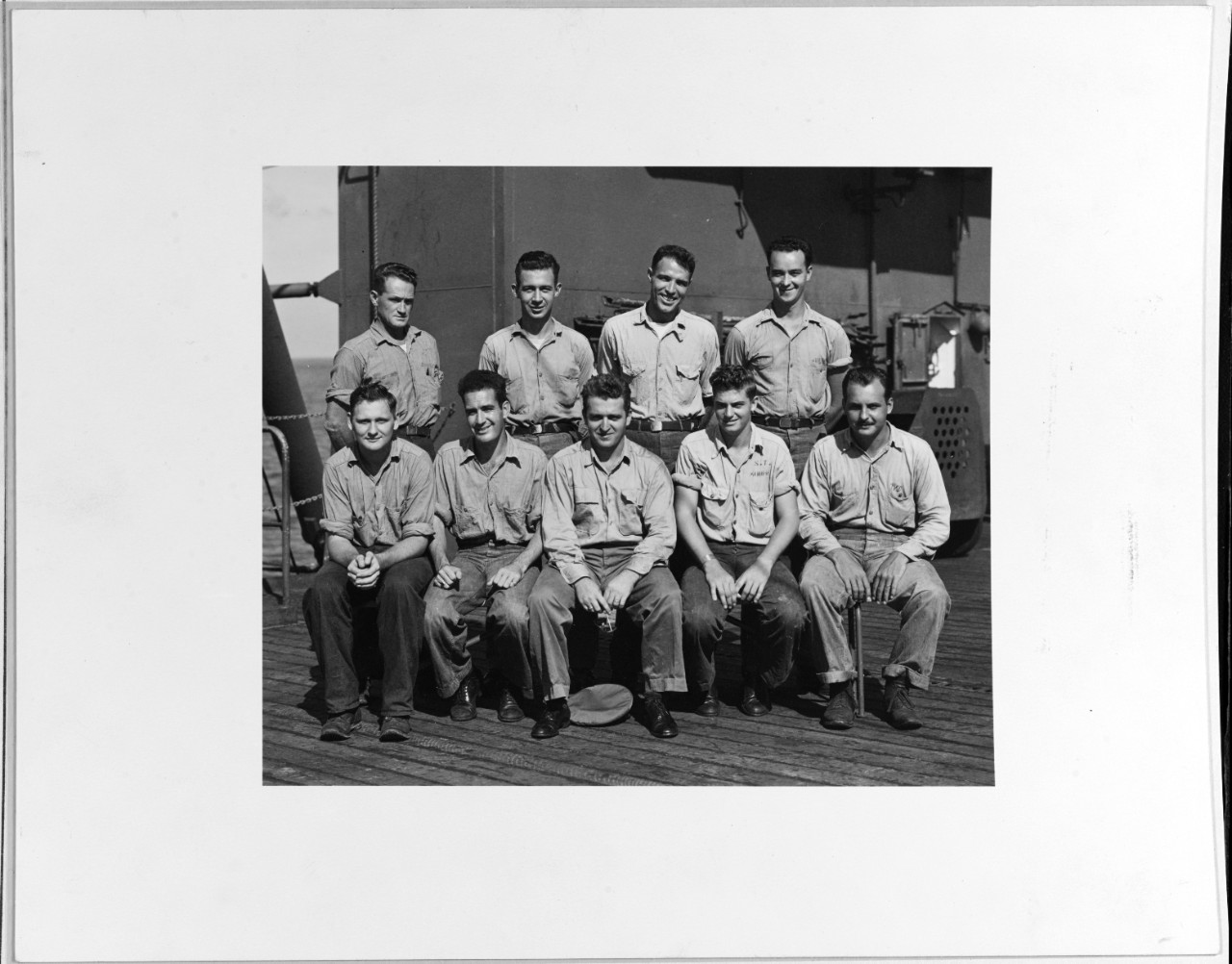
Ship's yeomen of escort carrier USS Makin Island (CVE-93), c. 1945.

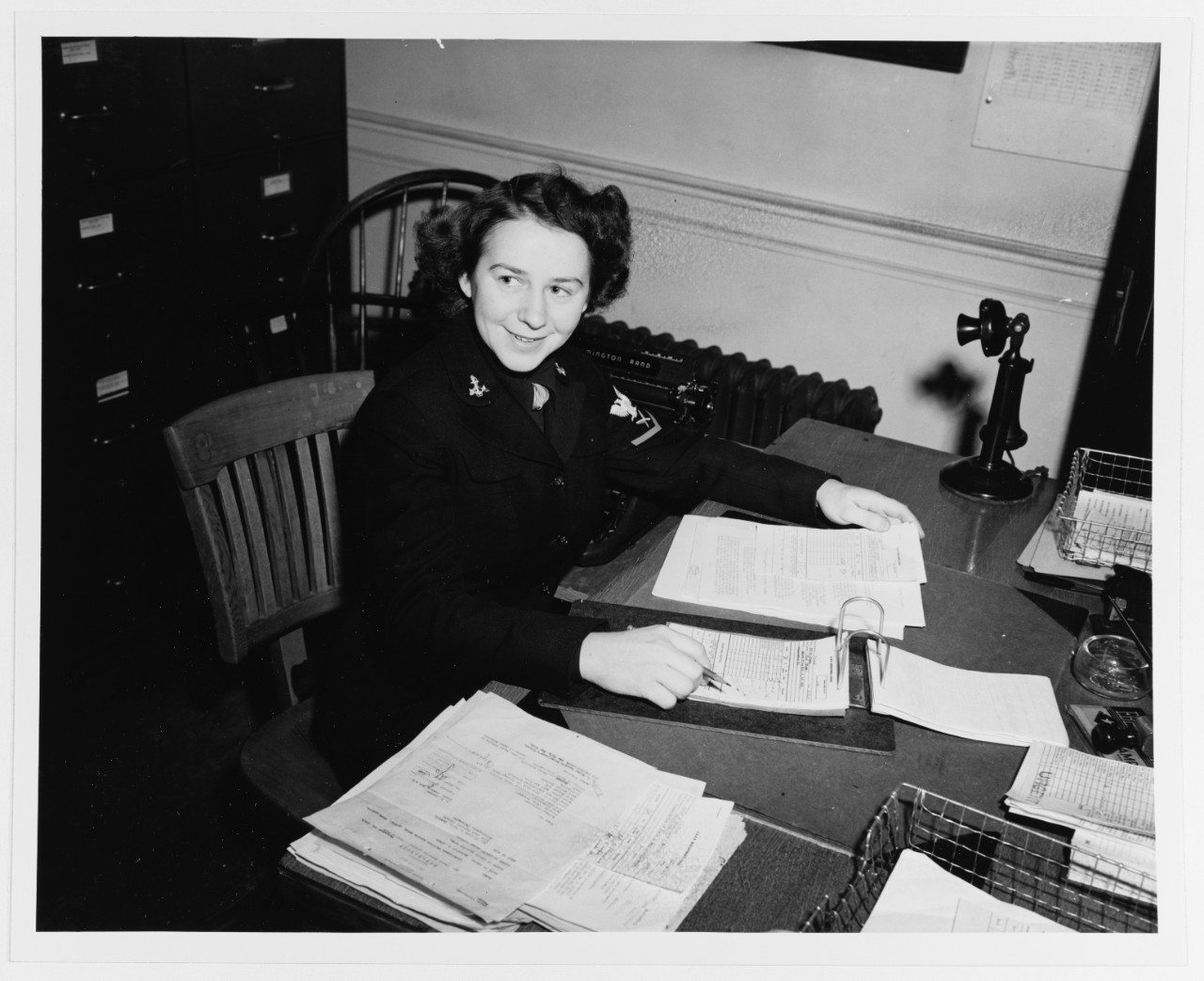
WAVE Y3c Ruth Beffre on duty at Navy Headquarters, New York City, 1943. Note candlestick phone, forms, and paper trays on desk.

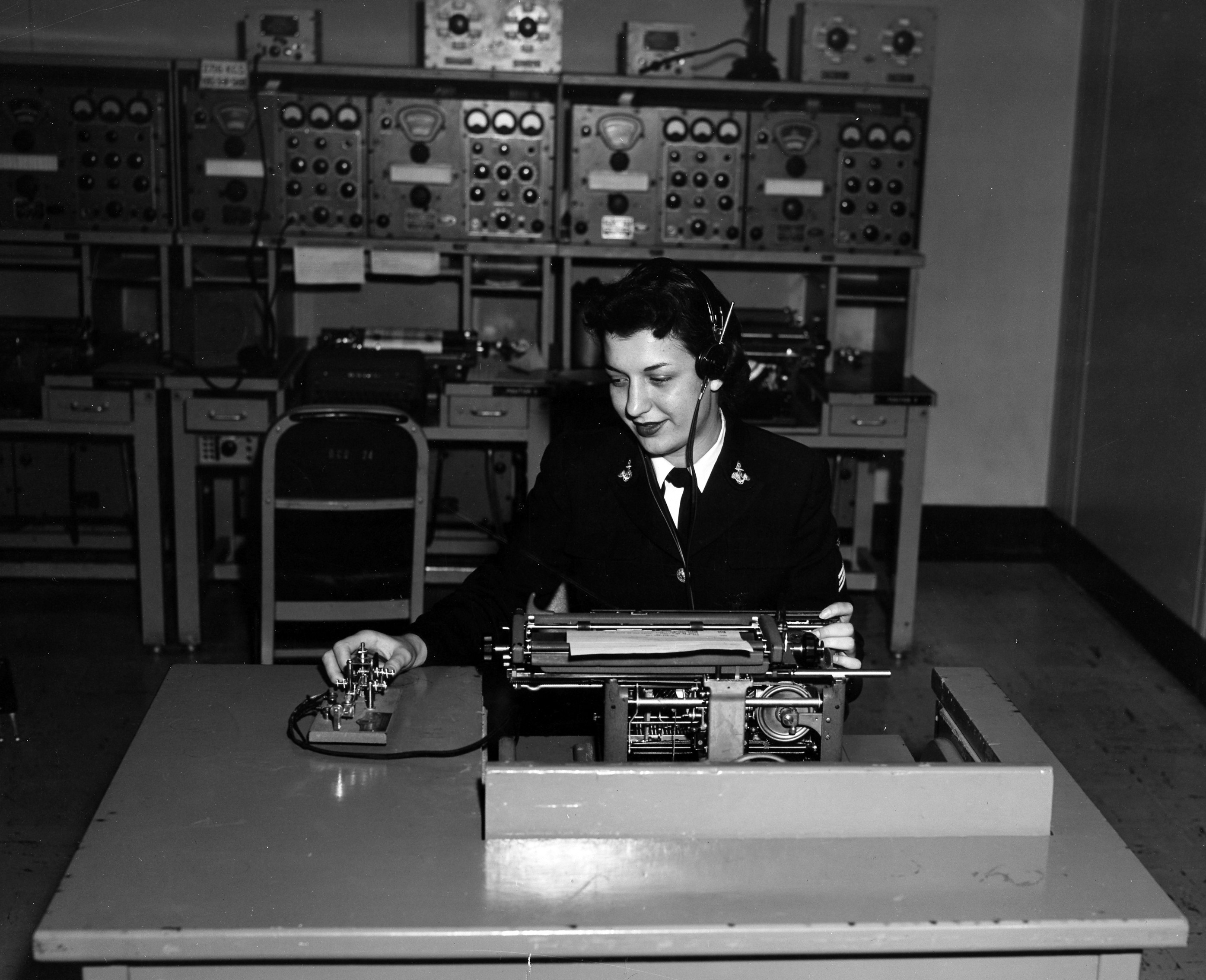
WAVE yeoman transcribing dictation from a dictation machine. Note yeoman's headphones and the dictation machine on the desk.

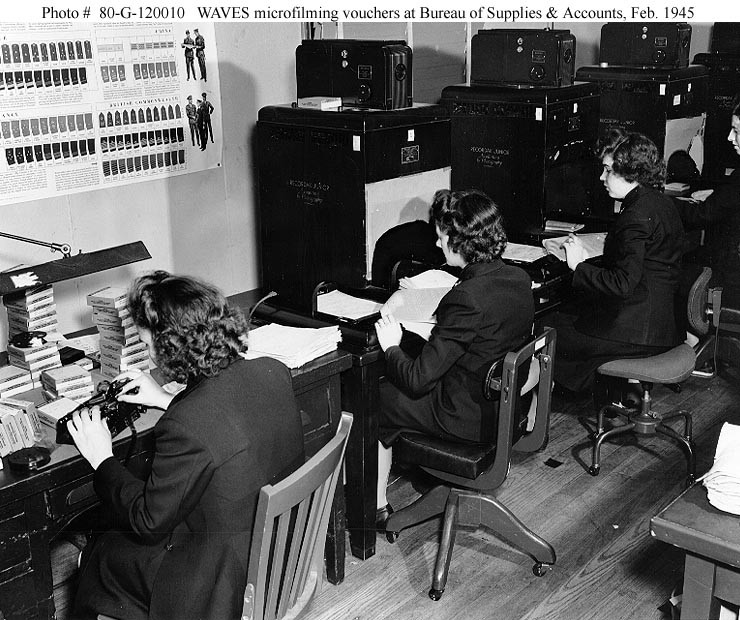
WAVES microfilming vouchers, Washington D.C., February 1945

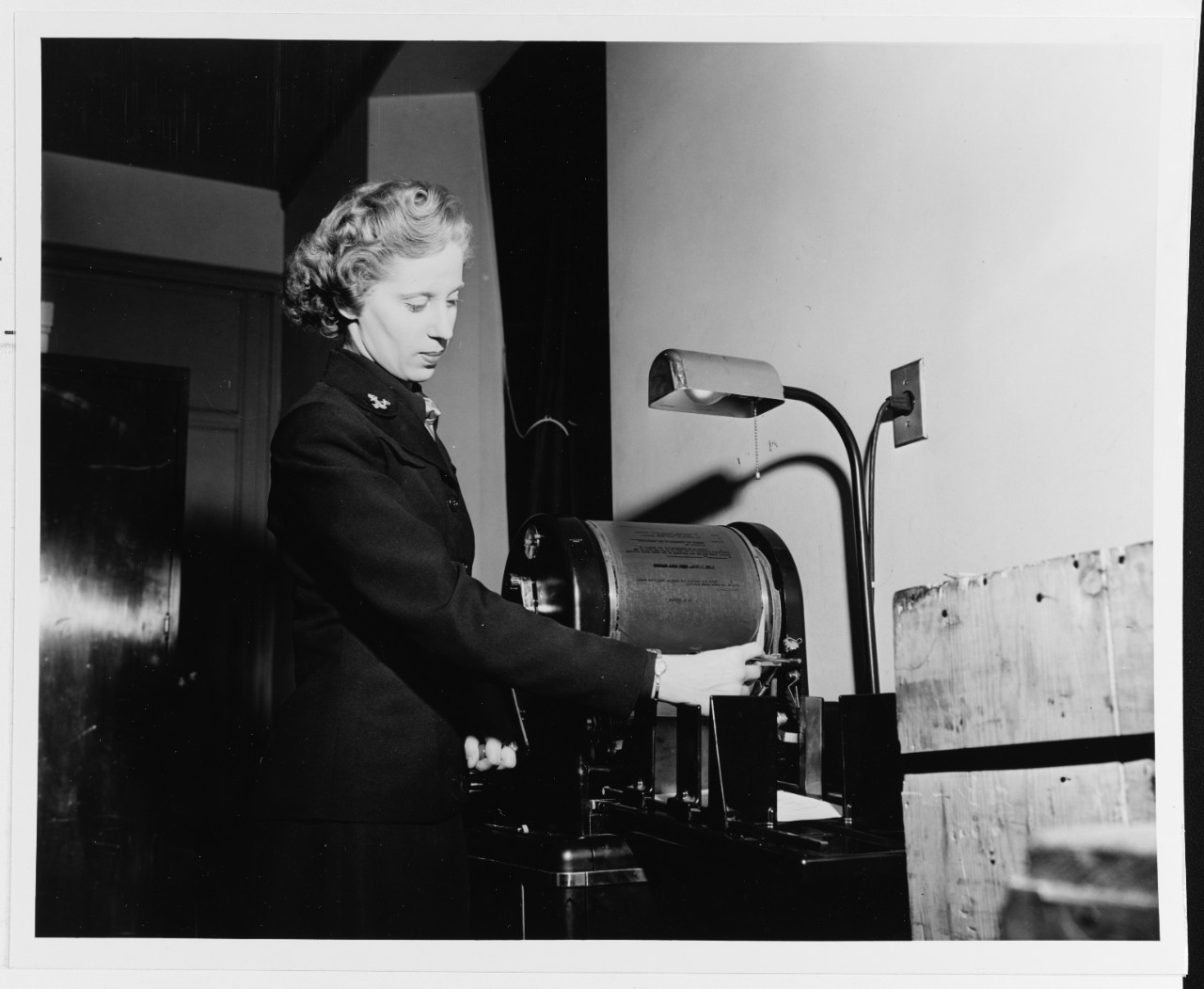
WAVE Y3c Harriette Heyman operating a ditto machine, 1943

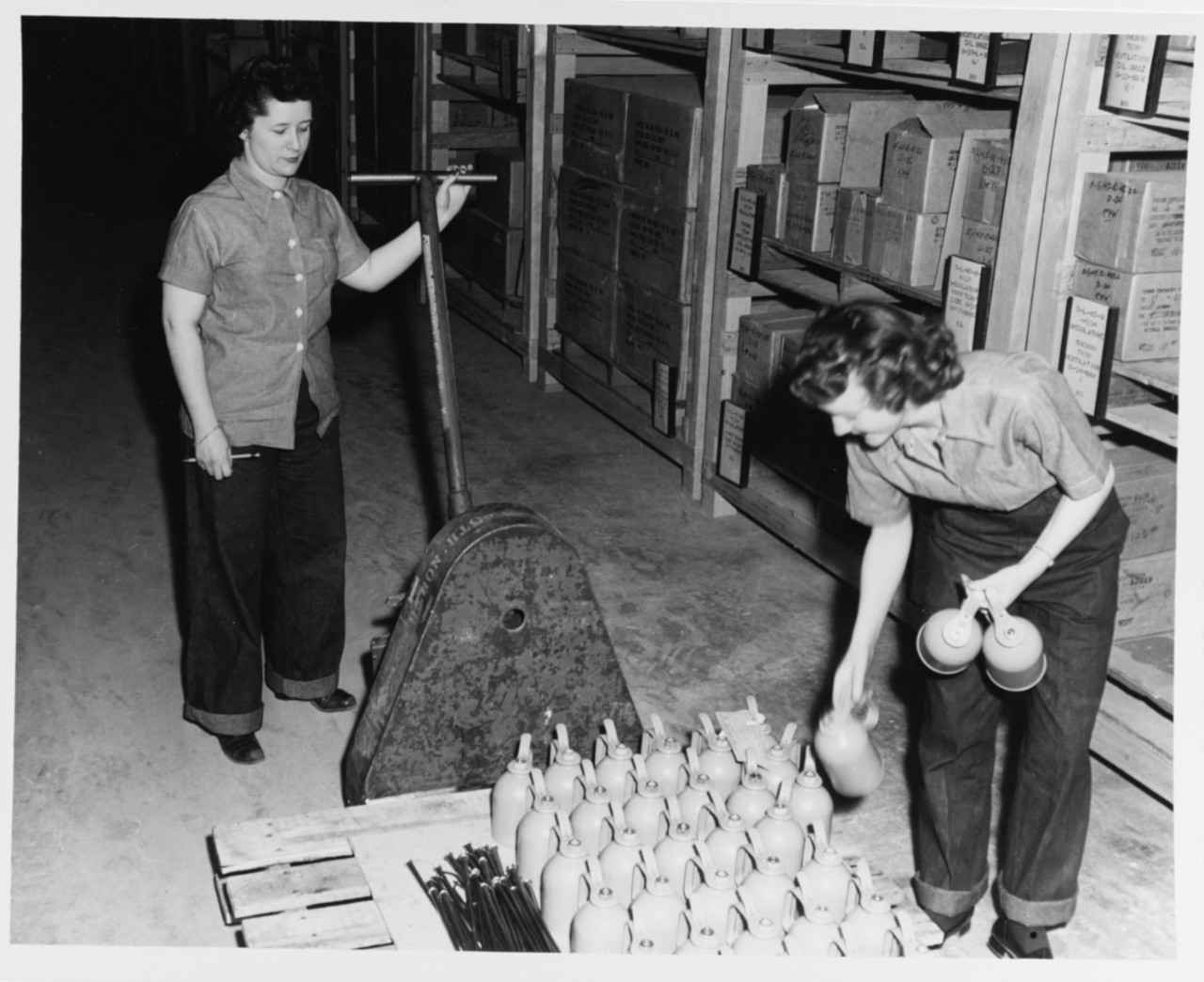
WAVE yeoman storekeepers load oil cans on a pallet, c. 1944

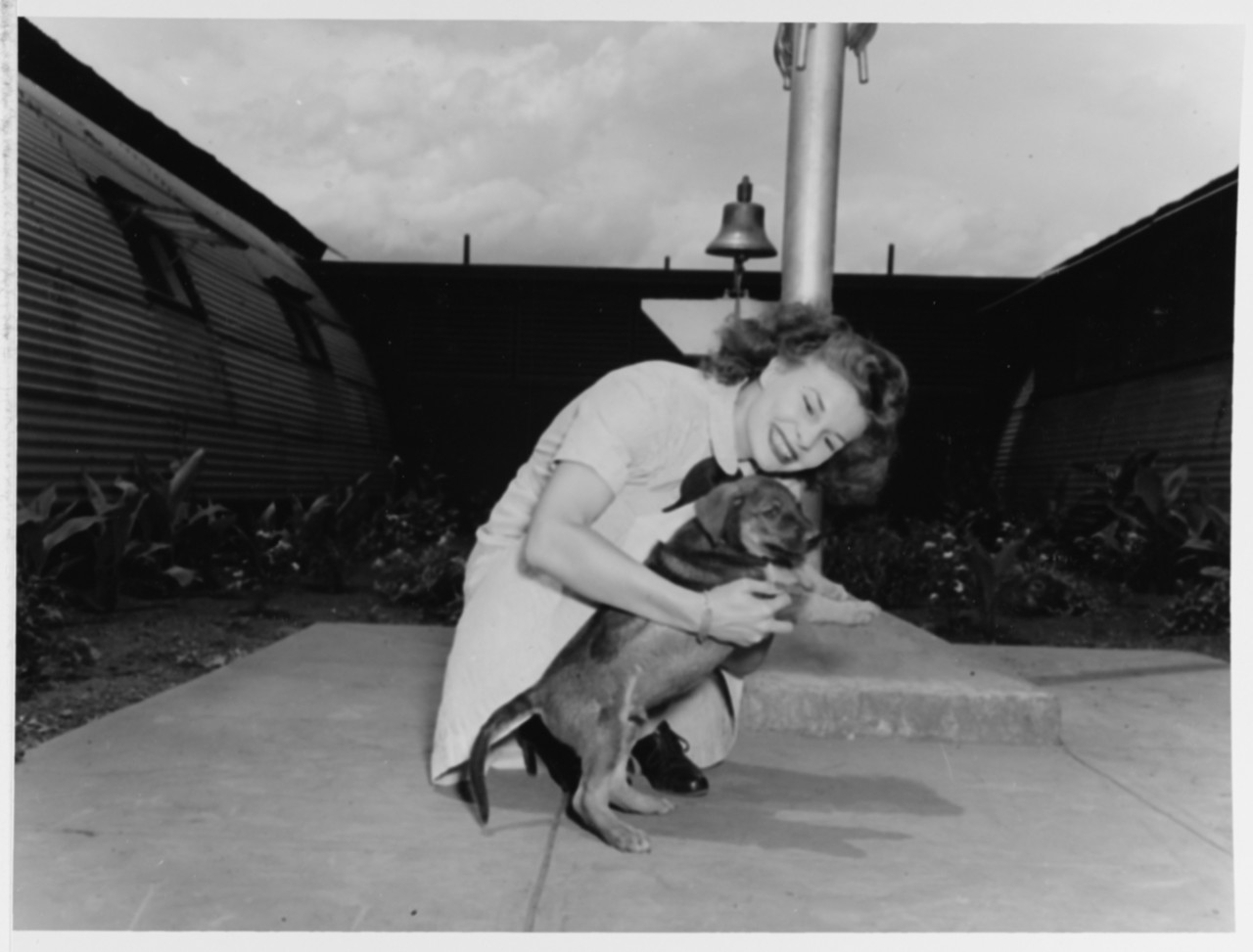
WAVE Y3c Betty Dickinson, with barracks mascot "Okinawa", assigned to Pearl Harbor, May 1945

=== Rate and rating ===
The US Navy has a hierarchy that is unique among the US armed forces. "Rank" is reserved for naval officers and warrant officers. "Rate" and "rating" is applied to enlisted personnel. "Rate" refers to a seaman's pay grade; "rating" refers to the occupational specialty. The approximate naval equivalent of the US Army infantry sergeant would be a boatswain's mate second class. Following is a brief listing of the various yeoman rates and ratings between 1797 and 1896:

- Yeoman of the gunroom (1797-1813)
- Captain's clerk (1798)
  => changed to yeoman (1835)
  => changed to ship's yeoman (1884)
  => changed to yeoman (1893)
- Carpenter's yeoman (1798)
- Gunner's yeoman (1798-1838)
- Boatswain's yeoman (1799-1864)
- Paymaster's steward (1861)
  => changed to paymaster's writer (1867)
  => changed to paymaster's yeoman 1c, 2c, 3c (1870)
  => discontinued 1893
- Engineer's yeoman (1874-1893)
- Equipment yeoman (1884-1893)
- Ship's writer (1865)
  => changed to writer 1c (1893)
  => changed to yeoman 1c (1896)
- Writer 2c and 3c (1893)
  => changed to yeoman 2c and 3c (1896)

Note that this list illustrates the gradual shift towards administrative and clerical duties between 1800 and 1900, tasks which are familiar to modern US Navy yeomen.

=== Significant Awards and Commemorations ===
Yeomen have been awarded the Navy Medal of Honour, Navy Cross, and have had some ships and bases named after them.

Recipients of notable medals and awards:

- Thomas Atkinson, Navy Medal of Honor
- William Wright, Navy Medal of Honor
- Harry B. Alderman, Navy Cross
- Roger Johnstone, Navy Cross
- Mathew E. O'Gorman, Navy Cross
- Ralph W. Shuey, Navy Cross
- Emerson B. Wentworth, Navy Cross
- Charles B. Fletcher, Navy Cross
- Benjamin Sachs, Navy Cross
- James L. Snyder, Navy Cross
- Garry G. Gallagher, Navy Cross

Further, the USS Ellis (DD-154) was named after George Henry Ellis who was killed during the Battle of Santiago. The American Legion Post 62, in Denison Texas, was named after Frederick W. Wilson who was killed in the sinking of the USS President Lincoln.

== Modern navy yeomen ==
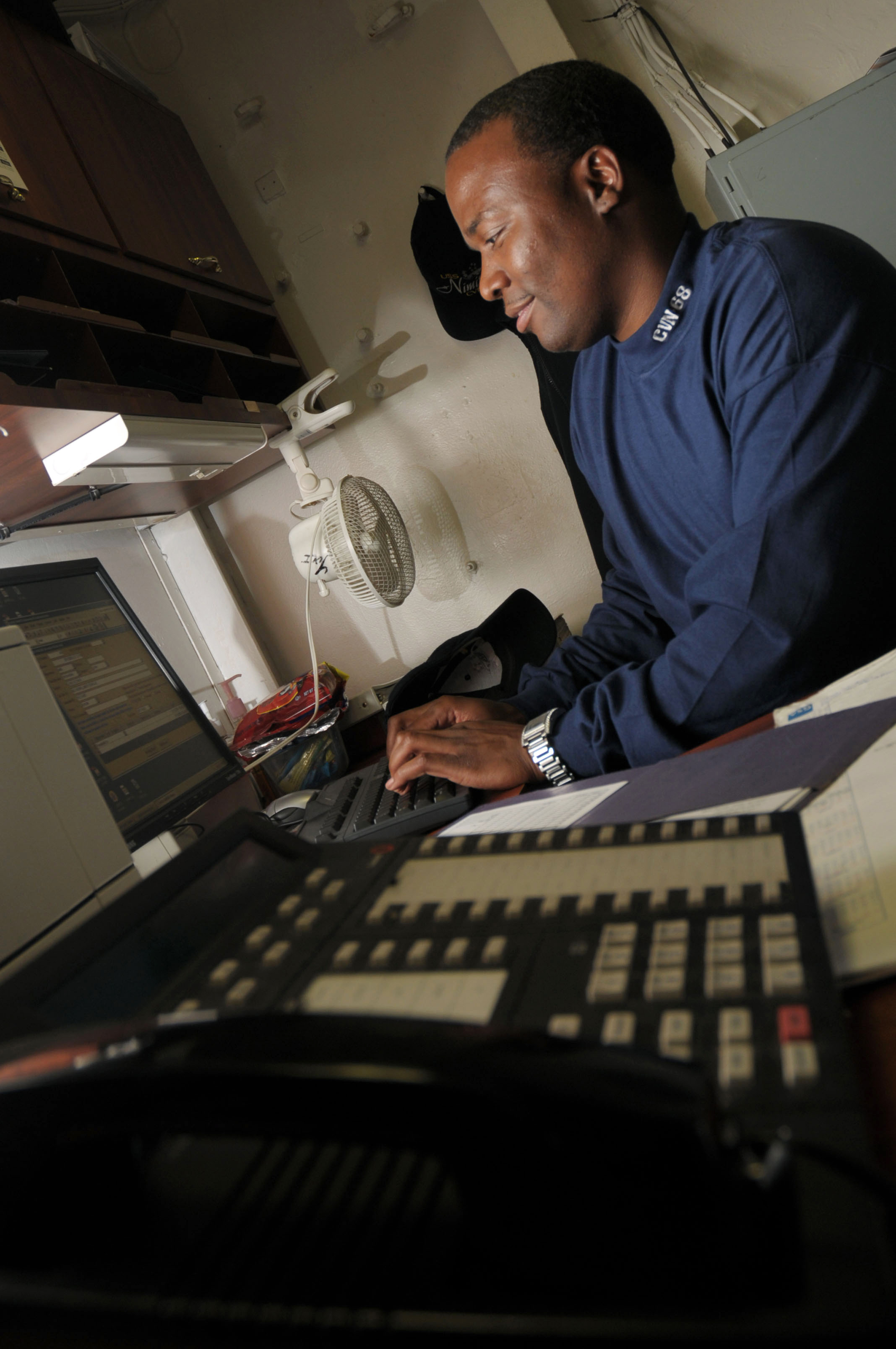
YN2 Artez Davis of the administrative department of USS Nimitz (CVN-68).

Today's yeomen performs administrative and clerical work. Their duties include protocol, naval instructions, enlisted evaluations, commissioned officer fitness reports, naval messages, visitors, telephone calls and mail (both conventional and electronic). They organize files, operate office equipment, and order and distribute office supplies. They write and type business and social letters, notices, directives, forms and reports. Both yeoman and yeoman submarine ratings require at least a 4-year enlistment.

=== Training ===
Yeoman Class 'A' School, approximately 7 weeks long, is held at the Naval Technical Training Center (NTTC), located on the Naval Air Station Meridian in Mississippi. Yeomen in the submarine service (YNS) then attend 4 weeks of submarine instruction at the Naval Submarine Base New London in Connecticut. Yeoman Class 'C' school, for flag officer writer (NEC A15A), is also at NTTC Meridian, and is run as a five-week course.

=== Flag writer ===
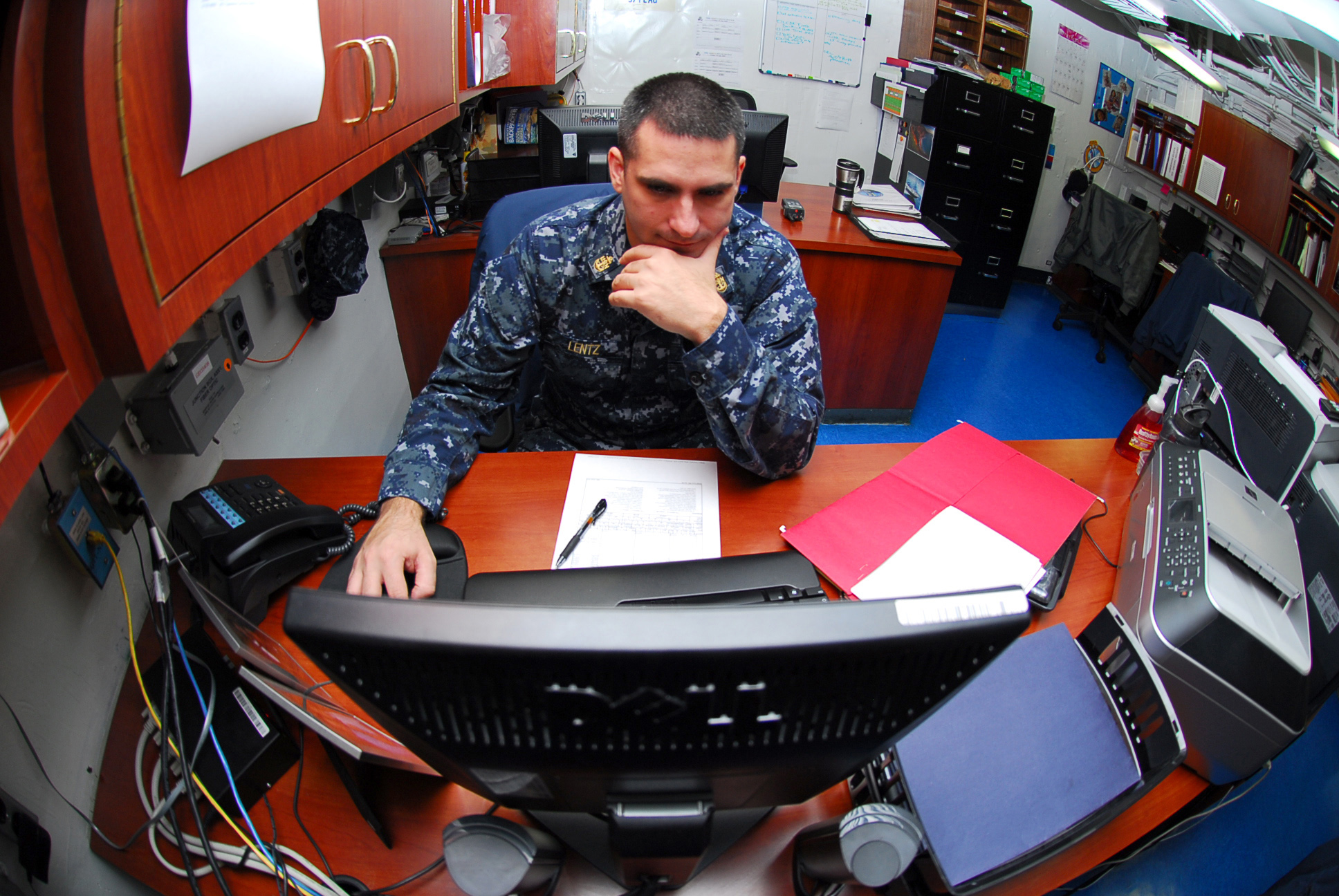
YNC Brett Lentz, Flag Administration Officer, checks the status of Carrier Strike Group (CVW) 11 personnel in the flag admin office aboard the USS Nimitz (CVN-68).

A yeoman flag writer is a senior yeoman, typically at the petty officer first class (E-6) level or higher, who serves on the personal staffs of flag and/or general officers and certain other senior officers. Flag writers draft personal and professional correspondence, act on matters of social usage, protocol, honors and ceremonies, prepare and liquidate travel orders, and prepare officer reports of fitness for signature by a flag or general officer. They must be able to function independently. Individuals serving as flag writers are in a highly visible position and must conduct themselves in a professional manner at all times. Additionally, members will be required to satisfactorily meet any additional requirements of the flag officer.

=== Rate structure ===
- Yeoman Seaman Recruit / YNSR (E-1)
- Yeoman Seaman Apprentice / YNSA (E-2)
- Yeoman Seaman / YNSN (E-3) (See USN apprenticeships)
- Yeoman Third Class / YN3 (E-4)
- Yeoman Second Class / YN2 (E-5)
- Yeoman First Class / YN1 (E-6)
- Chief Yeoman / YNC (E-7)
- Senior Chief Yeoman / YNCS (E-8)
- Master Chief Yeoman / YNCM (E-9)

=== Gallery ===
Yeomen of the modern Navy
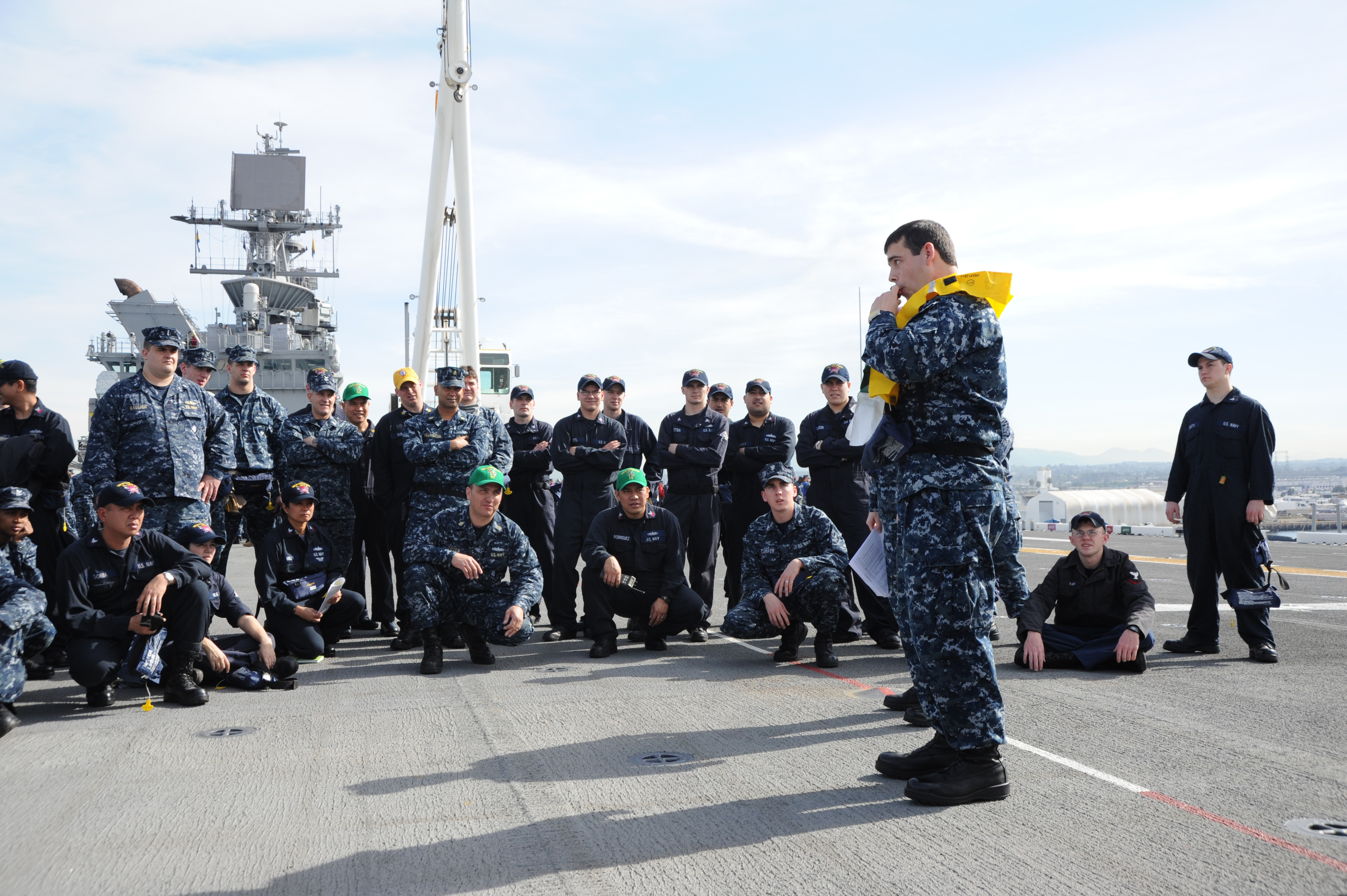
YN2 Thomas Jones demonstrates life preserver inflation during "abandon ship" drill aboard USS Makin Island (LHD-8).

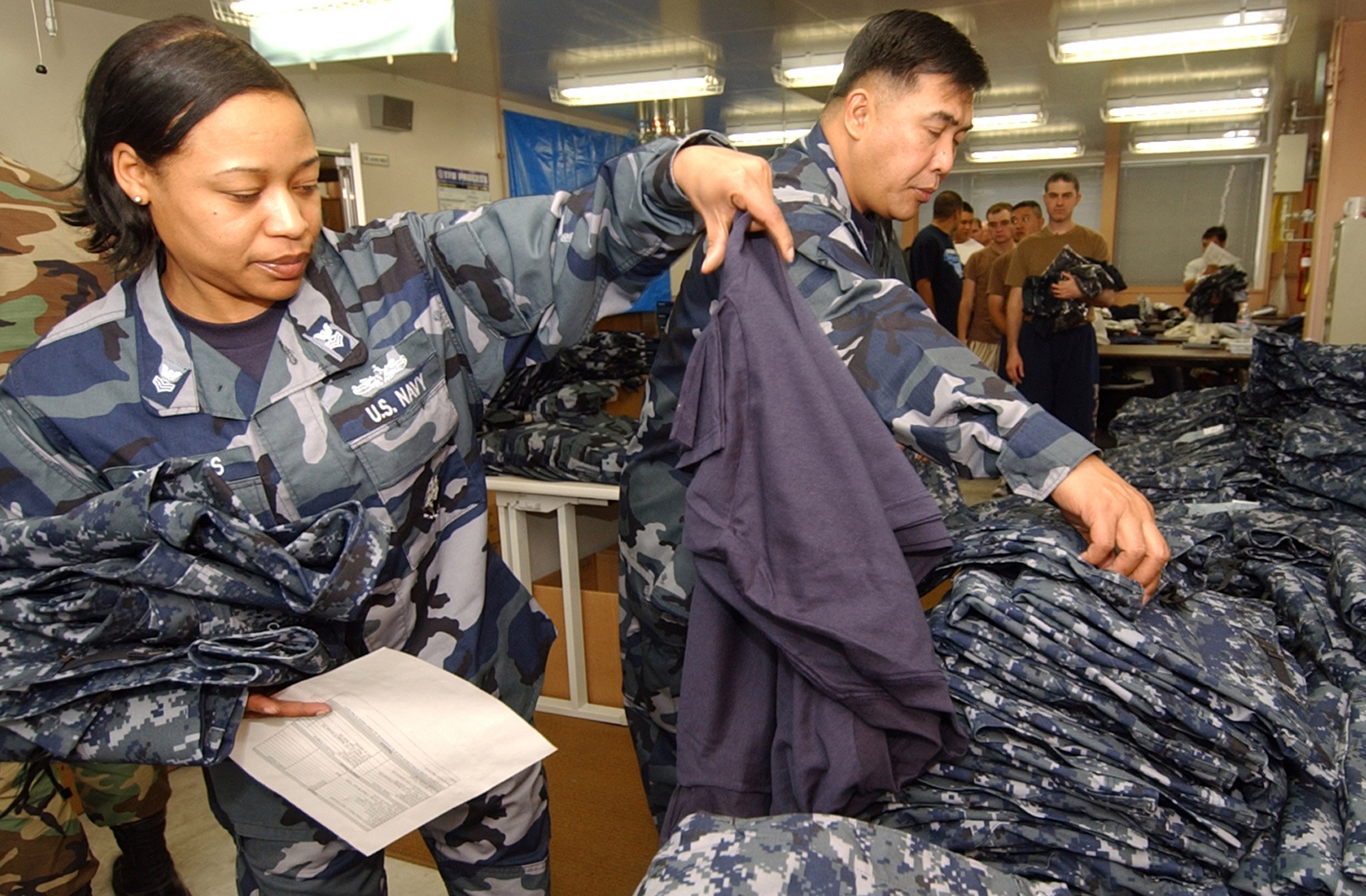
YN1 Latricia Perkins (left), assigned to the Administration Department at Naval Air Facility Atsugi, Japan, sorts through a pile of the new Navy Working Uniforms.

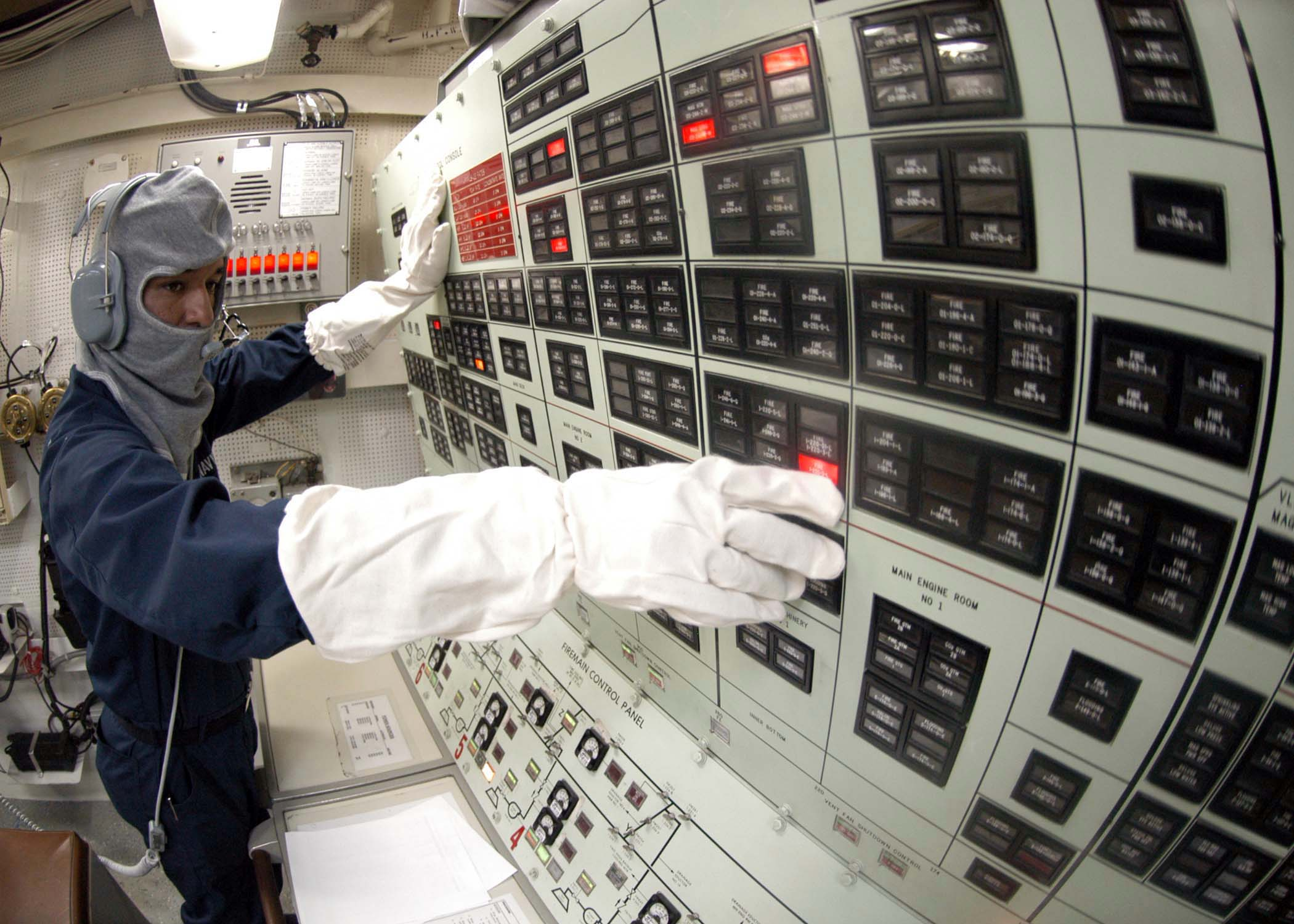
YN2 Nelson Munoz mans Damage Control Console during "general quarters" drill aboard USS Shiloh (CG-67).

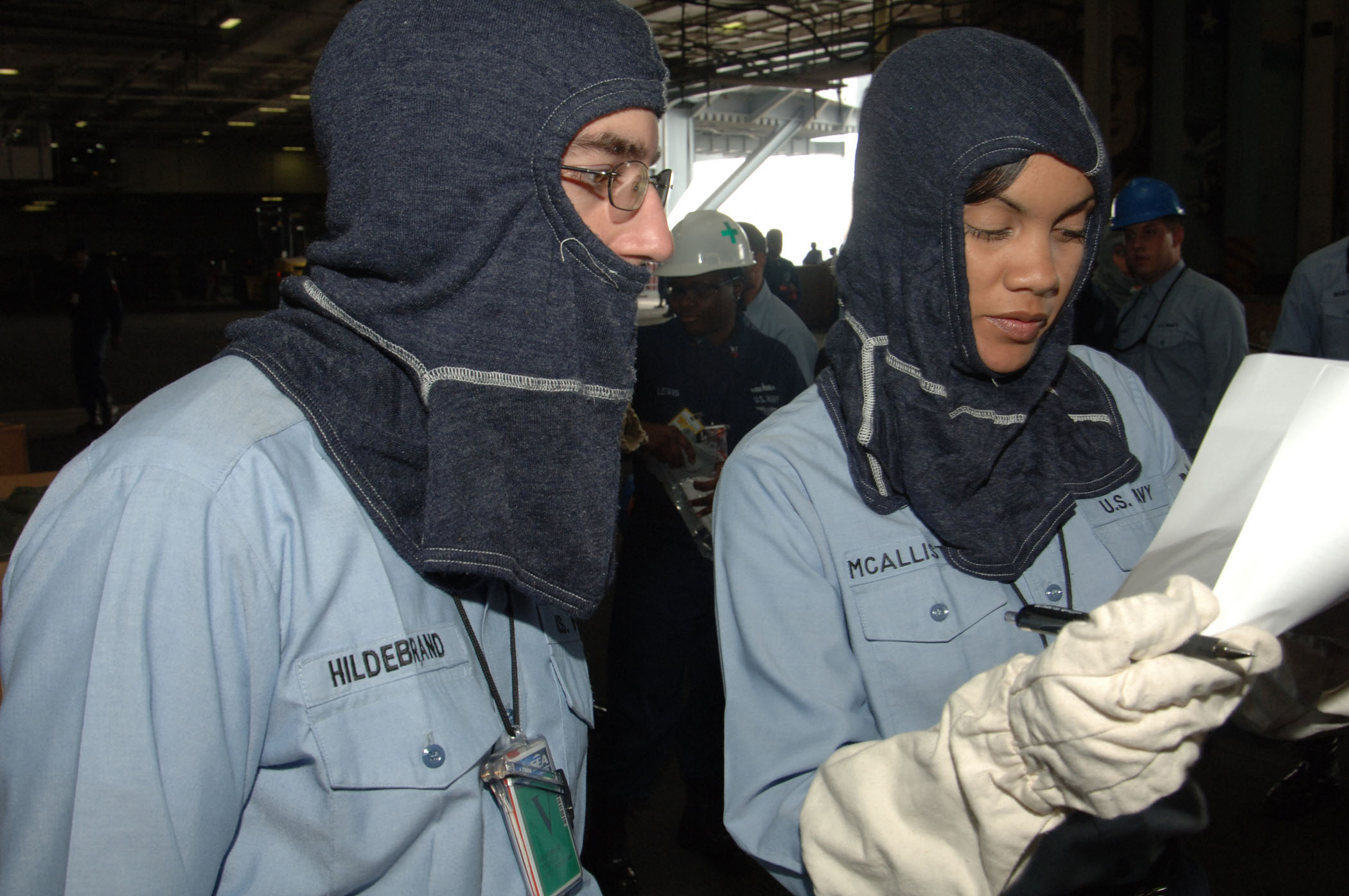
YN2 Tasha McAllister reviews muster roll during "general quarters" drill aboard USS Harry S Truman (CVN-75).

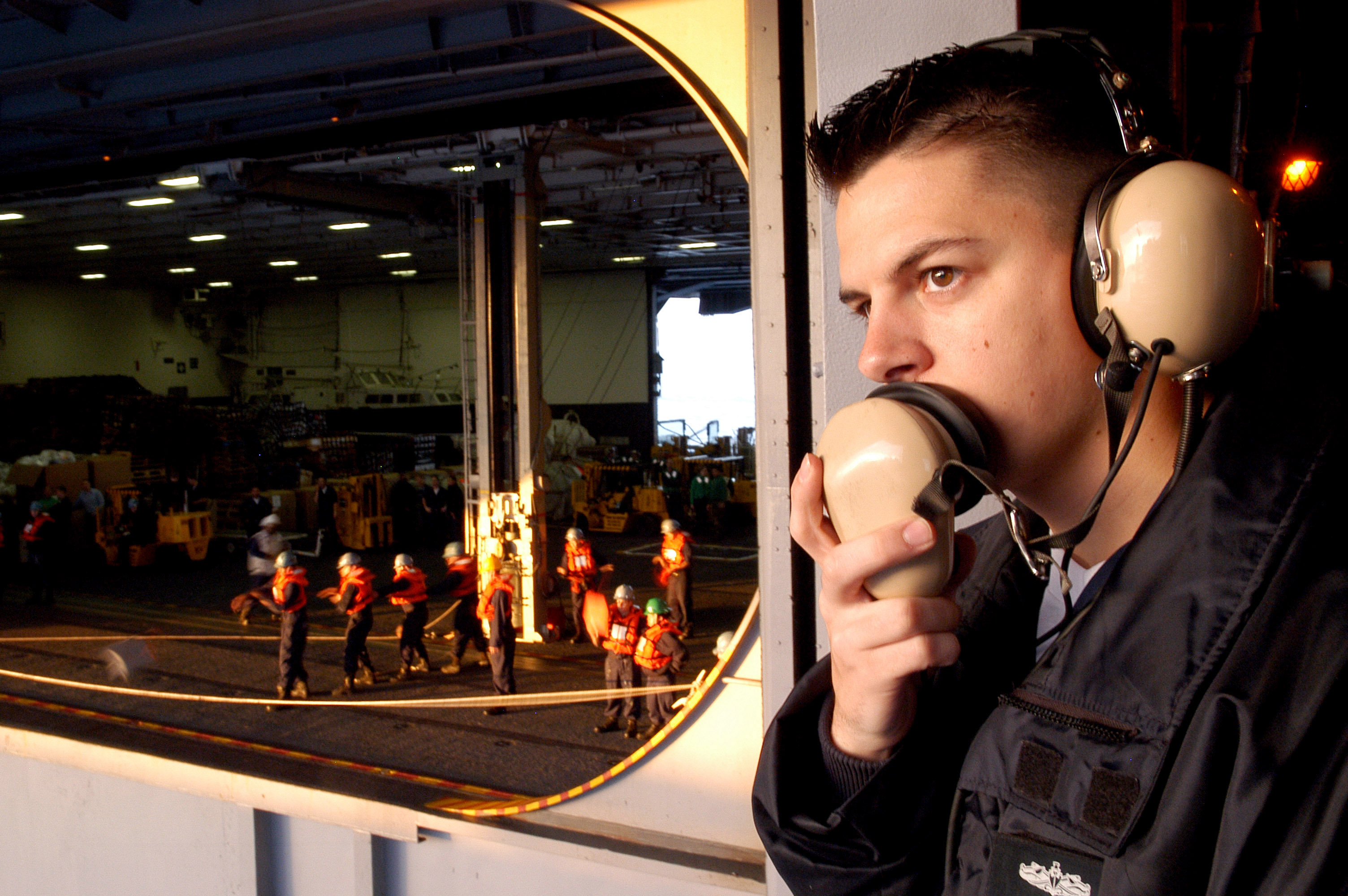
YN2 Patrick Shuman mans his station as deck control phone talker during a replenishment at sea (RAS) between Military Sealift Command (MSC) USNS Bridge (T-AOE-10) and USS Nimitz (CVN-68).

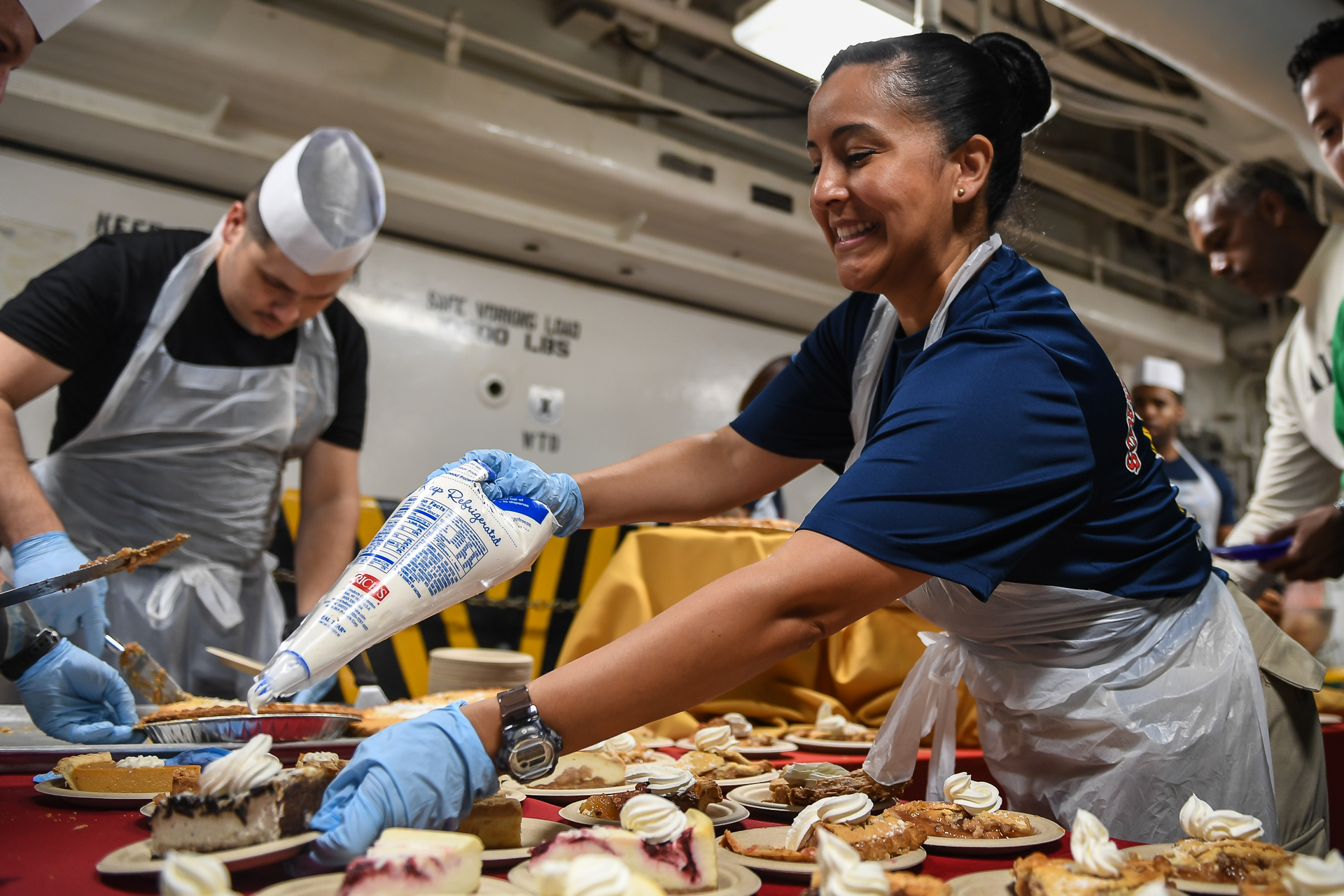
YNC Inez Cannon adds the topping to Thanksgiving dinner pie aboard USS Theodore Roosevelt (CVN-71).

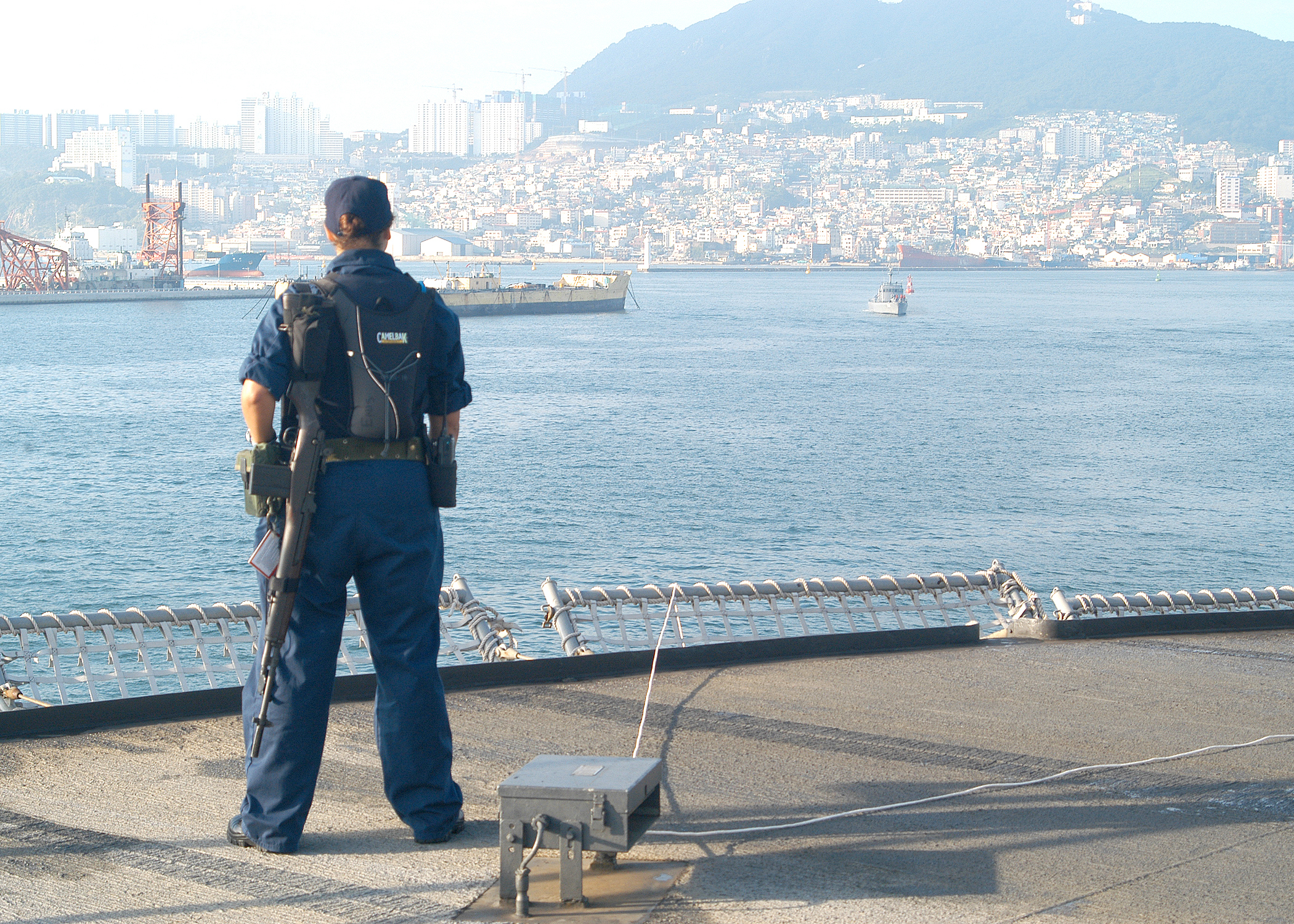
YN3 Tanya Enis stands force protection watch in Pusan harbor as USS Blue Ridge (LCC-19) makes a 2-day port call.

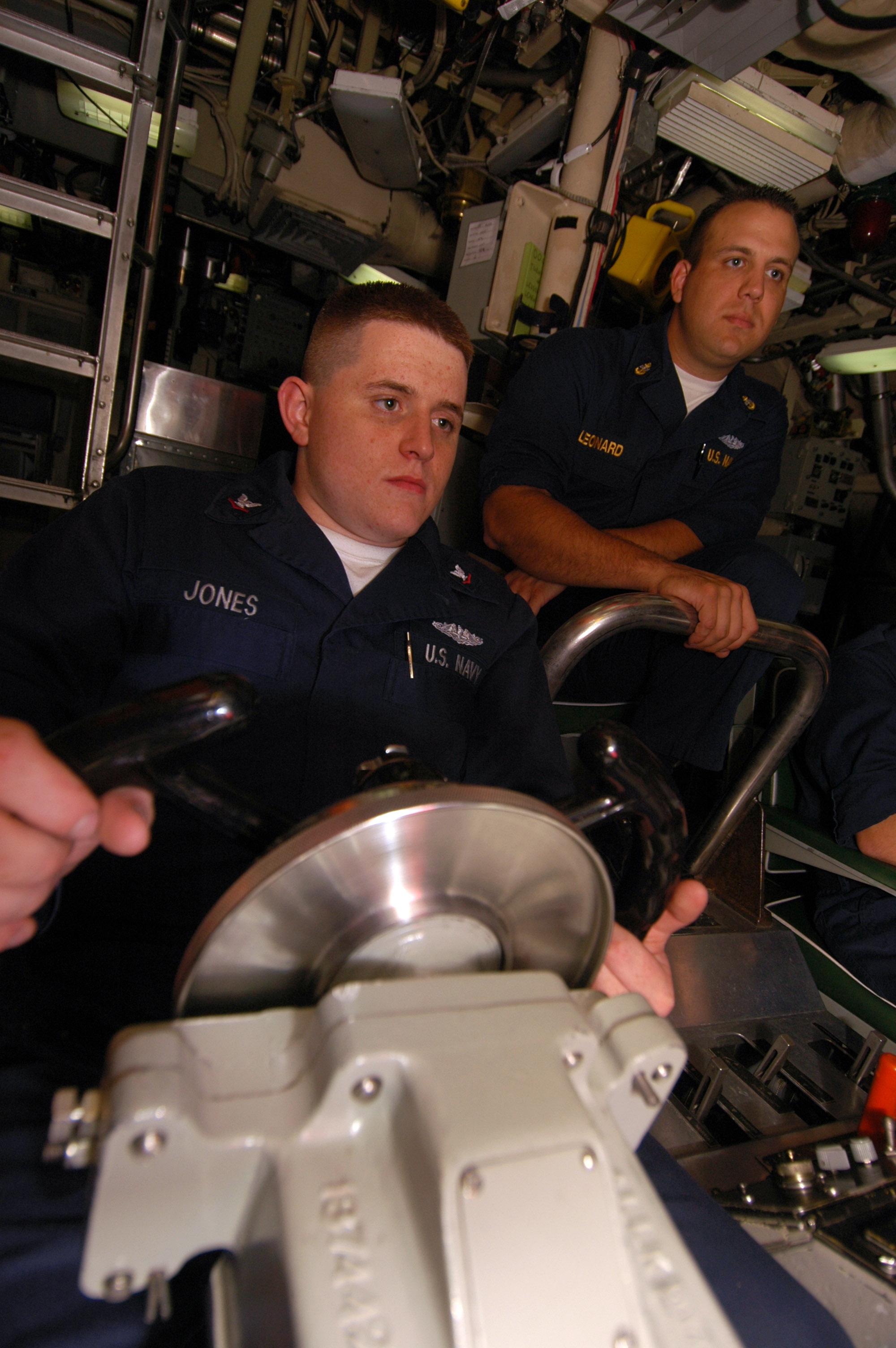
YN3 Joshua Jones, helmsman of the watch, maintains course and depth of USS Henry M. Jackson (SSBN-730). Diving officer of the watch Chief Fire Control Technician Troy Leonard looks on.

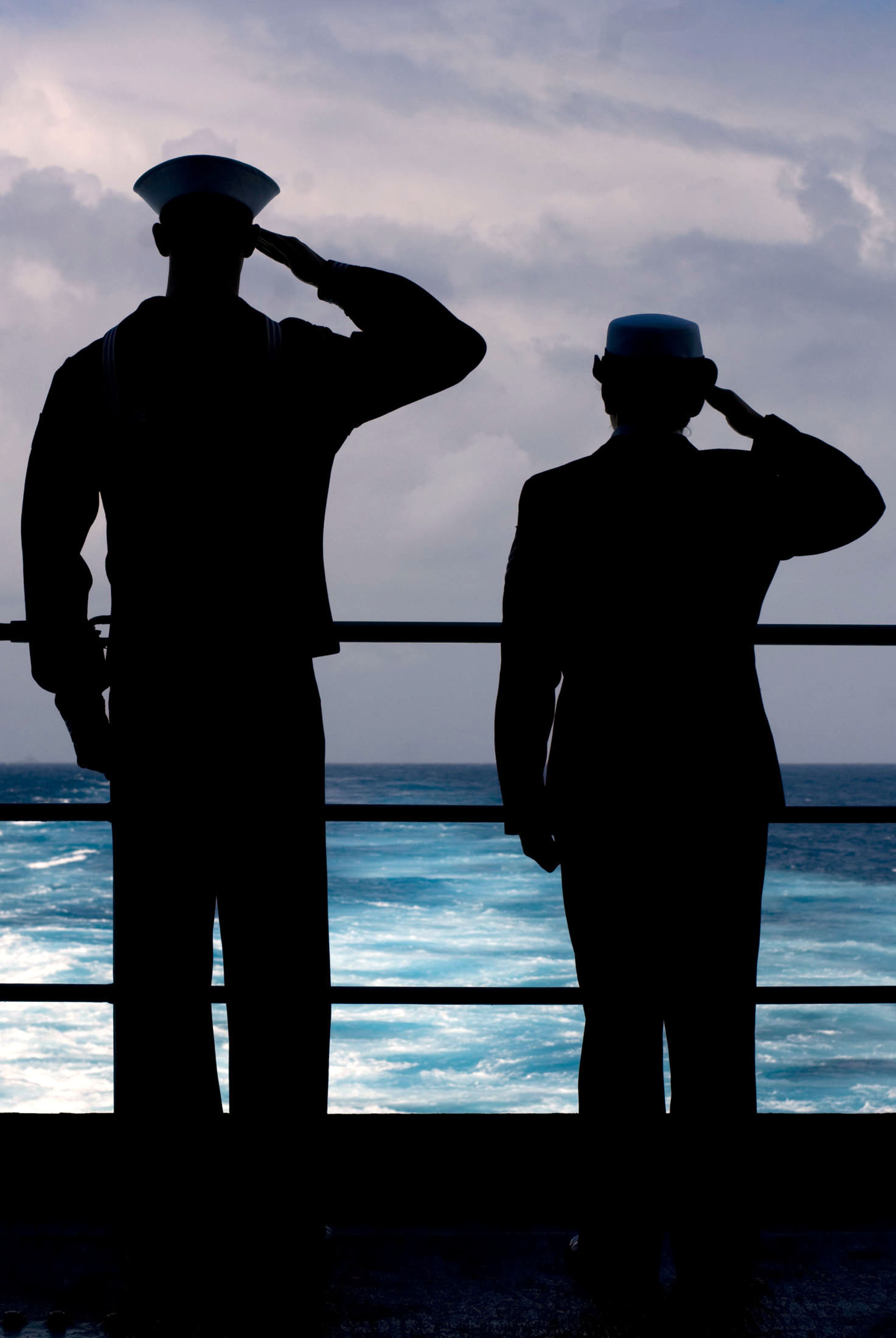
YNSN Jessica Gardner and YNSN Whitney Utter salute as USS Kitty Hawk (CV-63) passes over final resting spot of USS Lexington (CV-2).

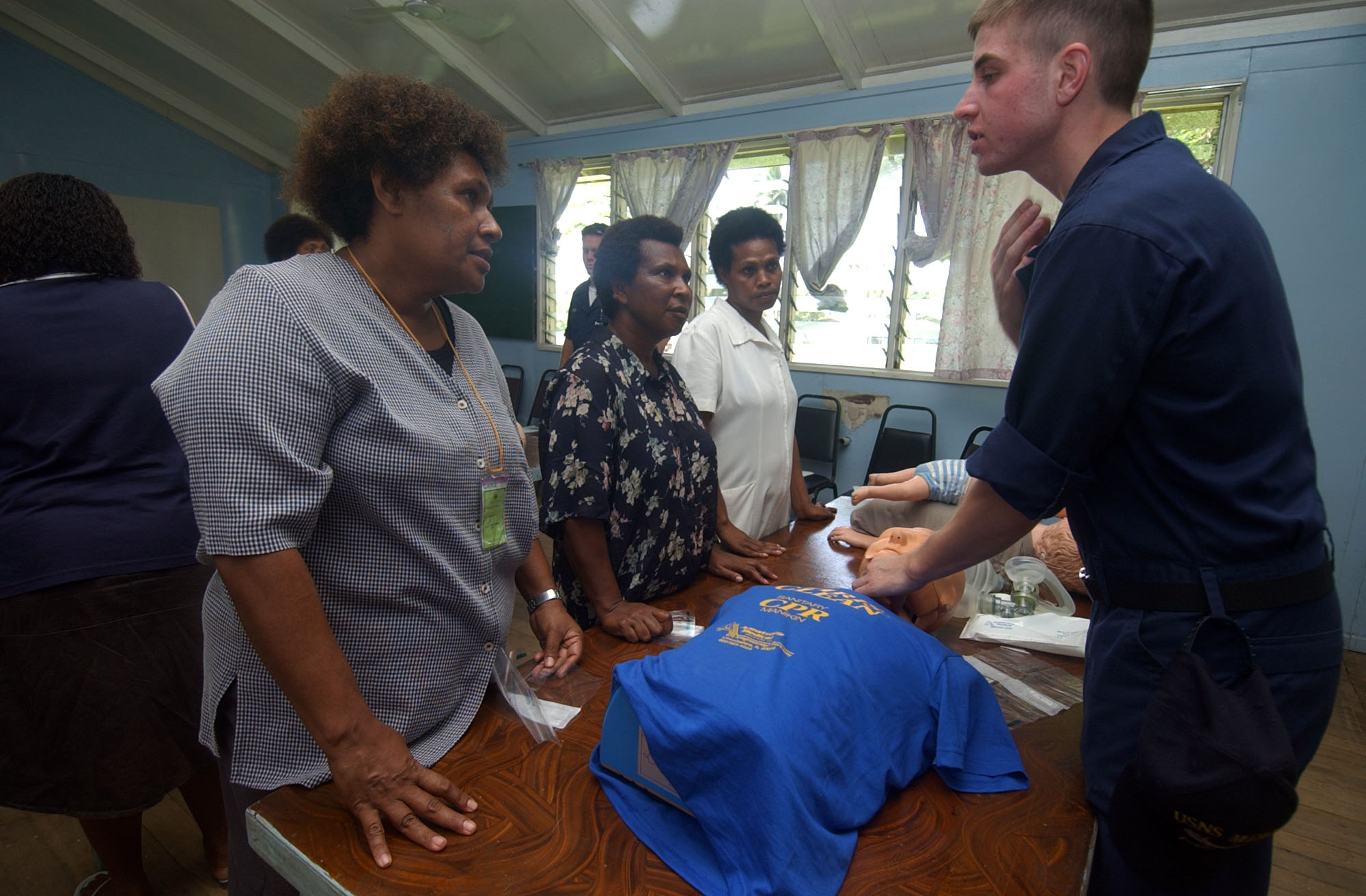
Aboard the Military Sealift Command (MSC) hospital ship, USNS Mercy, YN3 Dan S. Konzek demonstrates how to properly locate the carotid pulse to nurses from the Modilion General Hospital in Madang, Papua, New Guinea. USNS Mercy had just completed tsunami and earthquake relief operations in Indonesia (2005).
