= Blue Mountain =

Blue Mountain may refer to:

== Mountains ==
=== Canada ===
- Blue Mountain (British Columbia), in the city of Coquitlam
- Blue Mountain, Kings County, Nova Scotia
- Blue Mountain, Pictou County, Nova Scotia

=== India ===
- Phawngpui, Mizoram, India, also known as Blue Mountain; home of Blue Mountain National Park
- Nilgiri Mountains in South India

=== Jamaica ===
- Blue Mountain Peak, in the Blue Mountains range

=== United States ===
- Blue Mountain (Arkansas)
- Blue Mountain (California)
- Blue Mountain (Missouri)
- Blue Mountain (Montana), in Missoula
- Blue Mountain (Nevada), near Winnemucca
- Blue Mountain (New Jersey), a prominence of Kittatinny Mountain
- Blue Mountain (New York)
- Blue Mountain (Oklahoma)
- Blue Mountain (Pennsylvania)
- Blue Mountain (Washington), in Olympic National Park
- West Blue Mountain (New Mexico)

== Places ==
=== Settlements ===
==== Australia ====
- Blue Mountain, Queensland, a locality in the Isaac Region
- Blue Mountain Heights, Queensland, a locality in the Toowoomba Region

==== United States ====
- Blue Mountain, Alabama, former town in the United States mostly annexed by Anniston, Alabama in 2003
- Blue Mountain, Arkansas, town in the United States
- Blue Mountain, California, former settlement in the United States
- Blue Mountain, Mississippi, town in the United States
- Blue Mountain Lake (hamlet), New York, hamlet in the United States

=== Water bodies ===
- Blue Mountain Lake (New York lake) a lake in the United States
- Blue Mountain Lake (Arkansas), artificial lake in Arkansas, United States
- Blue Mountain Creek, in New South Wales, Australia

=== Other places ===
- Blue Mountain (ski resort), a ski resort in Ontario, Canada
- Blue Mountain Resort, a ski resort in Pennsylvania, United States
- Blue Mountain Formation, a geological formation in Ontario, Canada
- Blue Mountain College, in Blue Mountain, Mississippi, United States

== Roads ==
=== Australia ===
- Blue Mountain Road, a road in Queensland

== Music ==
- Blue Mountain (band), an alt-country musical group
  - Blue Mountain (Blue Mountain album), 1993
- Blue Mountain (Brandon Heath album), 2012
- Blue Mountain (Bob Weir album), 2016 solo album by former Grateful Dead singer and guitarist Bob Weir
- Blue Mountain Publishing, founded by Island Records founder Chris Blackwell

== Other uses ==
- Blue Mountain Arts, a greeting card company founded by poet Susan Polis Schutz and physicist/illustrator Stephen Schutz in 1971
- Blue Mountain, a logo used by Paramount Pictures and its companies
- Blue Mountain Pottery, a Canadian company
- Blue Mountain State, an American comedy series
- ASCI Blue Mountain, decommissioned supercomputer at Los Alamos National Laboratory
- Jamaican Blue Mountain Coffee
- Blue Mountain (film), a 1997 Swiss film

== See also ==
- Blue Mountains (disambiguation)
- Blue Ridge (disambiguation)
- Mount Blue (disambiguation)
- Nilgiri (disambiguation)
- Chhota Bheem Neeli Pahaadi (lit. 'Chhota Bheem Blue Mountain'), an Indian animated film in the Chhota Bheem series
