= Blue Ridge =

Blue Ridge may refer to any of the following:

== Places ==
=== Canada ===
- Blue Ridge, Alberta

=== United States ===
- Blue Ridge, Alabama
- Blue Ridge, Arizona
- Blue Ridge, Georgia
- Blue Ridge, Indiana
- Blue Ridge, Missouri
- Blue Ridge, New York, a hamlet in the town of North Hudson
- Blue Ridge (Hamilton County, New York), a ridge in the towns of Lake Pleasant and Indian Lake
- Blue Ridge, Texas
- Blue Ridge, Virginia
- Blue Ridge, Seattle, Washington
- Blue Ridge Berryessa Natural Area, California
- Blue Ridge Dam, a hydroelectric dam in Fannin Co., Georgia
  - Lake Blue Ridge, a lake created by the completion of Blue Ridge Dam
- Blue Ridge Mountain (New York), an elevation in Hamilton County
- Blue Ridge Mountains, a major range of the Appalachian Mountains
  - Blue Ridge Mountain, in Virginia and West Virginia
  - Blue Ridge Parkway, a road running through the Blue Ridge Mountains
- Blue Ridge Road, a 19-mile scenic highway in the Adirondacks, New York
- Blue Ridge Summit, Pennsylvania
- Blue Ridge Wilderness Area, a wilderness area in the Adirondacks, New York

== Arts entertainment, and media ==
- Blue Ridge (album), a 1985 album featuring Jonathan Edwards and The Seldom Scene
- Blue Ridge (2010 film)
- Blue Ridge (2020 film)
- Blue Ridge (TV series)

== Brands and enterprises ==
- Blue Ridge (dishware), a type of American dishware manufactured by Southern Potteries, Inc. in the 1930s, 1940s, and 1950s
- Blue Ridge Capital, a private equity firm and hedge fund
- Blue Ridge Communications, a cable television provider in eastern Pennsylvania

== Transport ==
- Blue Ridge (Amtrak), a passenger train
- USS Blue Ridge, a list of Navy ships
  - USS Blue Ridge (AGC-2), an amphibious force flagship that served from 1943 to 1947
  - USS Blue Ridge (ID-2432) or the Great Lakes passenger steamer Virginia in service for less than a year during 1918
  - USS Blue Ridge (LCC-19), a command and control ship serving as the Seventh Fleet command ship

== See also ==
- Blue Ridge High School (disambiguation)
- Blue Ridge Railway (disambiguation)
