= Monte Azul (disambiguation) =

Monte Azul is a municipality in Minas Gerais, Brazil.

Monte Azul may refer to:

- Monte Azul Paulista municipality in São Paulo, Brazil
- The NGO Associação Comunitária Monte Azul in São Paulo, Brazil
- Monte Azul (ship), a container ship owned by A.P. Moller Singapore Pte. Ltd
- Montes Azules-class logistics ship, operated by the Mexican Navy

== See also ==
- Mount Blue (disambiguation)
