= Home Town (TV series) =

American reality television series

- Genre: Reality
- Created by: Jenna Keane
- Starring: Ben Napier; Erin Napier
- Country of origin: United States
- Original language: English
- No. of seasons: 10
- No. of episodes: 128

Production
- Production location: Laurel, Mississippi
- Running time: One hour and four minutes
- Production company: RTR Media Inc

Original release
- Network: HGTV
- Release: January 24, 2016 – present

Home Town is an American reality television series starring husband and wife team, Ben and Erin Napier, that premiered on January 24, 2016 on HGTV. It is produced by RTR Media, a Canadian production company. The couple restores homes mainly in Laurel, Mississippi. The eighth season of Home Town began airing on January 7, 2024.

On January 4, 2021, a spin-off titled Home Town: Ben's Workshop premiered on Discovery+, and on May 2, 2021, a spin-off titled Home Town Takeover premiered on HGTV.

== Premise ==
Erin and Ben Napier renovate houses in the small Southern town of Laurel—frequently in its historic district. Each episode begins with a potential client choosing a home from two or three options that the Napiers recommend. A renovation plan is presented to the client, but the actual work is done without the client's participation. Episodes end with the Napiers revealing the completed renovation to the clients.

After being featured in Southern Weddings magazine and on the magazine's Instagram feed, the Napiers were contacted by HGTV. The show premiered in January 2016 and as of 2019 had high ratings in its timeslot, particularly among upscale women aged 25–54.

== Hosts ==
Erin and Ben Napier met while they were students at Jones County Junior College, near Laurel, prior to enrolling at the University of Mississippi, and were married in 2008. They have two daughters, Helen, who was born in January 2018, and Mae, who was born on May 28, 2021.

In 2024, their Alma Mater, Jones County Junior College, named the new Erin and Ben Napier School of Design and Building Arts building in their honor; the program trains students to teach the skills needed to fill a workforce gap of skilled building designers, carpenters, trades workers, and craftspeople.

== Episodes ==
=== Series overview ===
Season	Episodes	Originally released	
Season	Episodes	First released	Last released
1	11	January 24, 2016	May 23, 2017
2	11	January 1, 2018	March 12, 2018
3	13	January 14, 2019	April 8, 2019
4	16	January 20, 2020	June 8, 2020
5	15	January 3, 2021	April 25, 2021
6	11	December 26, 2021	April 3, 2022
7	18	December 4, 2022	April 16, 2023
8	20	January 7, 2024	May 26, 2024
9	16	December 29, 2024	May 18, 2025
10	16	January 4, 2026	TBA

=== Season 1 (2016–17) ===
No. overall	No. in season	Title	Original release date
1	1	"Big Renovation in a Small Town"	January 24, 2016
2	2	"A House With History"	March 21, 2017
3	3	"Homecoming"	March 28, 2017
4	4	"Cottage Charm"	April 4, 2017
5	5	"A Town to Call Home"	April 11, 2017
Kristen dreams of watching her kids grow up in a small town as she did, but as a military family, they are always on the move. Now that husband Kelvin is close to retirement, they've decided to settle down so their young children have a place to call home. Kelvin and Kristen's all-in budget is $250,000, so Ben and Erin show the couple two family-friendly homes: a big, old charmer that's a lot of house, and a character-rich Craftsman with a lower price but a longer "to do" list. Ben and Erin create the ultimate family home including a study area, play space and stunning new kitchen with a unique bowling alley countertop.
6	6	"History in the Making"	April 18, 2017
7	7	"Porch Dreams"	April 25, 2017
8	8	"So Long Loft, Hello Home"	May 2, 2017
9	9	"Small Town Life for a Growing Family"	May 9, 2017
10	10	"Military Family Finds Small Town Charm in Mississippi"	May 16, 2017
The Carson family is new to Laurel and Erin and Ben transform a home for them by adding European touches—especially in the kitchen. However, the Napiers don't renovate the entire house and in an episode that aired in 2025, they return to the house after a new couple buys it. It's the first time they've revisited a home they renovated. See season 9, episode 4, "There's No Place Like Home", below.
11	11	"Country Singer Moves From The Big City to a Small Town"	May 23, 2017

=== Season 2 (2018) ===
No. overall	No. in season	Title	Original release date
Special
12	–	"Home Town Holiday Special"	January 1, 2018
Season
13	1	"Banquette Dreams"	January 8, 2018
14	2	"An Island For All"	January 15, 2018
15	3	"Countryside in the City (AKA: A Place To Call Home)"	January 20, 2018
16	4	"Southern Italianate Charm"	January 29, 2018
17	5	"A Quiet Place to Call Home"	February 5, 2018
18	6	"Move It or Lose It? (AKA: The Move of a Lifetime)"	February 12, 2018
19	7	"Colorful Custom Cottage"	February 19, 2018
20	8	"A Little Rough, A Little Refined"	February 26, 2018
21	9	"Room to Grow"	March 5, 2018
22	10	"Small Town Sophistication"	March 12, 2018

=== Season 3 (2019) ===
No. overall	No. in season	Title	Original release date
23	1	"A Vacation Everyday"	January 14, 2019
A new school district superintendent is moving to town with his family of five from the Gulf Coast.
24	2	"Everybody Wants a Porch"	January 21, 2019
An Arizona couple has $250,000 to spend on a renovation that will emphasize historic Southern architecture--especially a porch.
25	3	"Small Town Life Awaits"	January 28, 2019
A couple visited Laurel from Quebec, Canada, and decided to buy a vacation home there. They plan eventually to retire there.
26	4	"Leaving the Nest"	February 4, 2019
A newlywed couple has been living with relatives in Laurel, but are eager to have their own space. They hope their $180,000 renovation budget will facilitate entertaining friends in an open-plan kitchen.
27	5	"A Doctor in the House"	February 11, 2019
A pediatrician who was originally from Mississippi wants to start a practice in Laurel. The couple has $260,000 to renovate a historic home and wants an outdoor area for entertaining friends.
28	6	"A Modern Millennial Makeover"	February 18, 2019
A young, engaged couple seek a renovated home to establish their lives.
29	7	"Home is Where the Art is"	February 25, 2019
An artist and her son are moving to Laurel. She hopes her $200,000 budget will allow for a dedicated art studio.
30	8	"Sweet Home Laurel"	March 4, 2019
A woman whose family has deep roots in Laurel has returned to town and wants to invest $100,000 in renovating a historic house.
31	9	"An Old Familiar Place"	March 11, 2019
A Laurel native who has been away for decades wants to return to her childhood home town. She has a renovation budget of $120,000.
32	10	"Small Budget, Big Style"	March 18, 2019
A local small business owner has a tight budget of $75,000 to renovate a starter home. She wants to be within walking distance of downtown and to have space for her golden retriever.
33	11	"Southern Coastal Style"	March 25, 2019
Former residents of Mississippi return and hope to establish themselves in Laurel. They have a budget of $300,000 to renovate a home in coastal style.
34	12	"Putting Down Roots"	April 1, 2019
Two young doctors, recruited by the local hospital, plan to put down roots in Laurel. They hope to find a historic house with room to entertain.
35	13	"Moving to Main Street"	April 8, 2019
A woman wishes to move from her country home into downtown Laurel. She has a $125,000 budget to create a low-maintenance house that includes space for her son.

=== Season 4 (2020) ===
No. overall	No. in season	Title	Original release date
36	1	"From Los Angeles to Laurel"	January 20, 2020
Hollywood-based actor, Richard T. Jones, and his wife live in Los Angeles for his work, but they want to renovate a Craftsman-style home in Laurel.
37	2	"The Littlest House"	January 27, 2020
A 1,000-square-foot home is the goal of a businesswoman who has been living with her mother--saving for a $100,000 renovation budget.
38	3	"The Church House"	February 3, 2020
Ellisville Presbyterian Church has offered a manse to a new minister, but space is tight for them and their five children. The Napiers use the modest $85,000 budget to create a renovation that accommodates the family's needs.
39	4	"Can This House Be Saved?"	February 9, 2020
A young woman has just inherited her family's ancestral home, which hasn't been occupied for years and is in dilapidated shape. The Napiers use her $120,000 budget to revitalize it.
40	5	"Inspired by the Sea"	February 10, 2020
For her first home (after renting outside of town for years), a woman yearns for a luxurious master bathroom with a large bathtub. She has a budget of $170,000 to achieve this goal.
41	6	"The Sky's the Limit"	February 16, 2020
It's seldom that the Napiers are given an unlimited budget for a renovation, but that is what John Combe provided. He was a retired veteran who had recently lived outside the US and wanted to settle down in Laurel. Unfortunately, between the time of the recording of the episode and its airing, he passed away of natural causes. When the episode aired, the end credits included the following: "In loving memory of John Combe."
42	7	"Restoring a Craftsman"	February 23, 2020
The Napiers create a custom kitchen and renovated master suite in a historic, Craftsman-style home for a couple moving to Laurel from Alabama. The house also features a screened-in porch.
43	8	"Home Away From Home"	March 2, 2020
The Napiers create a large chef's kitchen in a vacation home for a couple who want space to entertain in a house that does not require a lot of upkeep.
44	9	"Bachelor's Paradise"	March 9, 2020
A bachelor has deep roots in Laurel, but has spent years on the road. He wants to return to town and the Napiers fix up a modest cottage for him.
45	10	"There's Just Something About a Porch"	March 16, 2020
46	11	"A House with History"	March 23, 2020
47	12	"Termite Terror"	March 30, 2020
48	13	"A Southern Dream"	April 6, 2020
49	14	"Fire and Water"	April 13, 2020
50	15	"The Cafe House"	June 1, 2020
51	16	"A Second Chance"	June 8, 2020
Special
52	–	"Home Town: Local Love"	November 28, 2020

=== Season 5 (2021) ===
No. overall	No. in season	Title	Original release date
53	1	"A New Beginning"	January 3, 2021
54	2	"Color Psychology"	January 10, 2021
55	3	"A Musician's Retreat"	January 17, 2021
56	4	"From The Big Apple To The Little Catfish"	January 24, 2021
57	5	"A Laurel Hug"	January 31, 2021
58	6	"All in the Family"	February 14, 2021
59	7	"Clean Lines, Open Spaces"	February 28, 2021
60	8	"Retreat Yourself"	March 21, 2021
61	9	"Design for Living"	March 28, 2021
62	10	"Thanks for the Memories"	April 4, 2021
63	11	"Family Values"	April 11, 2021
64	12	"Country House, City House"	April 18, 2021
65	13	"Grand Style"	April 25, 2021

=== Season 6 (2021–2022) ===
No. overall	No. in season	Title	Original release date
66	1	"First Time's the Charm"	December 26, 2021
67	2	"Bones and Bugs"	January 2, 2022
68	3	"Pumped About Laurel"	January 9, 2022
69	4	"One Space at a Time"	January 16, 2022
70	5	"Grand Millennial"	January 30, 2022
71	6	"The Zen Room"	February 6, 2022
72	7	"Campy Cabin Vibes"	February 27, 2022
73	8	"Sweet Tea Dreams"	March 6, 2022
74	9	"Wraparound Porch"	March 13, 2022
75	10	"Architect's Linear Loft"	March 27, 2022
76	11	"A House for Mom and Dad"	April 3, 2022

=== Season 7 (2022–2023) ===
No. overall	No. in season	Title	Original release date
77	1	"The Country House"	December 4, 2022
78	2	"The Family Tree"	December 11, 2022
79	3	"The Mullet House"	December 18, 2022
80	4	"Ginkgos and Gondolas"	January 1, 2023
81	5	"A Solid Foundation"	January 8, 2023
82	6	"From Windy City To City Beautiful"	January 15, 2023
83	7	"The Buzzard's Roost"	January 22, 2023
84	8	"A Colorful Match"	January 29, 2023
85	9	"Mississippi Made"	February 5, 2023
86	10	"A Drop of Sunshine"	February 19, 2023
87	11	"Blue Heaven"	February 26, 2023
88	12	"What's Good for the Goose"	March 5, 2023
89	13	"Second Chances"	March 12, 2023
90	14	"The Heart of Laurel"	March 19, 2023
91	15	"The Clock Starts Now"	March 26, 2023
92	16	"Wood, Brick and Clay"	April 2, 2023
93	17	"New-Stalgic Restoration"	April 9, 2023
Adult siblings Jennifer, Pam and Tommy Paulsen have the Napiers renovate the living room, dining room and kitchen of a home for the purpose of family reunions with their father, who lives in Laurel. The bedrooms and bathroom are to be updated in a future renovation. Their budget is $230,000. The Napiers return to the Paulsens' house in season 8, episode #18, "Unfinished Business" (May 19, 2024), after the Paulsens' father dies.
94	18	"The Maui of Mississippi"	April 16, 2023

=== Season 8 (2024) ===
No. overall	No. in season	Title	Original release date
95	1	"Left-Hand Man"	January 7, 2024
A family plans to move to Laurel from Canada to take advantage of its warmer climate. Ben's participation is limited as he recovers from shoulder surgery—forcing him to rely on assistance from friends and family.
96	2	"Chasing Waterfalls"	January 14, 2024
A civil engineer and artist is moving from Seattle to be closer to his father in Laurel. His one demand for the renovation is a hot tub.
97	3	"Homecoming"	January 21, 2024
The Napiers undertake a nostalgic project—the renovation of the Old President's House at Jones College, where they first met. A young couple who work for the College will reside there and need it to look less institutional and more homey.
98	4	"Everything Can Be Restored"	January 28, 2024
A woman buys her first house for her and her son. Her main request of the Napiers is a proper laundry room.
99	5	"From Show Goats to Show Stopper"	February 4, 2024
A Laurel couple who run businesses in town buy a historic building to provide room for their work and a loft space in which they may live. The Napiers renovate a large open area into a cozy loft.
98	6	"Craftorian"	January 21, 2024
A family selects a historic house that combines Craftsman and Victorian styles. Hence, the Napiers designate it the "Craftorian."
99	7	"Tickled Pink"	February 25, 2024
A woman and her grandniece look for a home where the younger woman can care for her great-aunt, but they both can still be independent. The great-aunt demands a pink bedroom and bathroom, but the grandniece hates pink. Erin must find a way to satisfy their conflicting tastes.
100	8	"Follow Your Goosebumps"	March 3, 2024
A Laurel native has inherited her childhood home following the recent death of her mother. Her own house is located next door and she and her family have $135,000 to renovate one or the other. They decide to move to "Nan's house" and the Napiers provide some much-needed updating to it. The mother was a cousin of the painter, Mandy Buchanan, who died in November 2022. Buchanan was a Laurel native who was Erin's artistic mentor and friend. The Napiers' renovation includes space for Buchanan's artwork.
101	9	"Rustic Renovation"	March 10, 2024
Barry and Dennis, a couple from Phoenix, are leaving the desert and their horses behind and moving to Laurel. The Napiers create a rustic retreat for them and solicit a painting by Mississippi artist, Carol Roark. She recreates a photograph of their horses and the Superstition Mountains near Phoenix.
102	10	"Old World, New Build"	March 17, 2024
A pair of quirky Laurel newlyweds are given a ramshackle house by their family. They're eager to move out of their "tiny house" and have $150,000 to spend on a renovation. For the first time in their history of house renovations, the Napiers determine that this house is in such bad shape that it needs to be razed so they can start anew. This presents an unfamiliar set of challenges to them as they are not accustomed to new builds.
103	11	"Shug and Spice"	March 24, 2024
A Laurel man is known by locals as "Shug" (for "sugar"), because that's what he calls everyone he meets. He and his wife live in a home built by her grandparents. They have $100,000 to spend on updating it to make it into the family hub it used to be. The Napiers stretch the budget to include a new bathroom and a storage closet just for Christmas items. And Erin paints a sign for "Shug's Grill."
104	12	"Mediterranean Vibes"	March 31, 2024
Neal and Saron, a young couple with two kids, have $500,000 to spend on a home that is closer to his family's wooden beam factory. In addition, Saron hopes to have space for a pottery studio. They select a home with a unique feature: an indoor fountain. Mississippi artist Bekye Fargason helps Erin paint the interior of the fountain so that it will be a suitably artistic centerpiece for Saron's pottery studio.
105	13	"Welcome to Laurel"	April 7, 2024
The Napiers help create the City of Laurel's first visitor center. The Center used a building that was originally part of a public housing project established in the early 1940s. After gutting most of the interior and replacing it with modern displays about the area, one apartment was preserved and made to look like it did 80 years ago. Erin assisted in locating 1940s-style furnishings and appliances while Ben created a kitchen table and cutting board to suit the era.
106	14	"Some Like It Hot"	April 14, 2024
During a scorching heat wave, the Napiers assist Tena and Bob Tomarazzo's relocation from New Jersey to Laurel. The Tomarazzos have $300,000 to invest and want a home that will be welcoming to their guests. Ben creates a massive "super" island for the kitchen. It and other renovations reflect a rustic Italian villa aesthetic.
107	15	"English Country Cottage"	April 21, 2024
Melina Velez lives in Florida, but she grew up on Long Island and she'd like to like to give her two children the sort of childhood she had there . She uses her $225,000 budget to buy a house with a large fireplace that reminds her of her past.
108	16	"Sisters Know Best"	April 28, 2024
The Jones family is known around Laurel for its seven daughters and its tractor service business. Shelley, one of the sisters, has $225,000 to spend on her first house and two of her sisters appear to advise her. The Napiers renovate a home with strong colors and a large patio that satisfies Shelley and her sisters. Ben devises a cabinet that uses antique tractor parts.
109	17	"Do You Believe in Bradgic?"	May 5, 2024
Brad Smith and Erin have been friends since high school in the early 2000s when they formed a band named Sunday's Maria. He solicits the Napiers help to transform his house, which, since his recent divorce, has become a bland bachelor's pad. With his $100,000 budget, they create new spaces that feature bold, dark colors. Erin suggests his kitchen contain a wet bar, but Brad replies that he'd rather have a "milk bar", as he's known for his affection for milk. The episode also contains a short performance by the reunited Sunday's Maria: Erin, Brad, Laura Jones (also featured in the previous episode), Cary Hudson (of Blue Mountain), and Taylor Sledge.
110	18	"Unfinished Business"	May 19, 2024
The three Paulsen siblings were featured in season 7, episode #17, "New-Stalgic Restoration" (April 9, 2023). The Napiers partially renovated a historic Victorian so the Paulsens and their own children would have a place to stay when visiting their father. The siblings planned to finish the renovation themselves. Unfortunately, their father died soon after the Napiers' renovation and the house remained unfinished and unusable. Consequently, for the first time in the history of Home Town, the Napiers return to a home they had previously done. In "Phase Two", as they call it, they renovate bedrooms and bathrooms that are in very rough shape. This time around, Jennifer, Pam and Tommy Paulsen have a $125,000 budget.

=== Season 9 (2024–2025) ===
The Napiers commented on season 9 in advance of its airing, explaining that they were moving into new areas of home improvements.

No. overall	No. in season	Title	Original release date
111	1	"When Life Gives You Tomatoes"	December 29, 2024
A Laurel couple with an expanding hot-sauce business look for a home that'll also support an urban garden to grow their ingredients. Erin and Ben develop a house with a commercial-grade kitchen for them, in addition to a park-like garden and greenhouse.
112	2	"Unlimited Dreams"	January 5, 2025
Amanda Cooley is the director of Unlimited Dreams Christian Learning Center, an educational environment for underserved students. She seeks the help of the Napiers to create a new school building, because their current facilities are inadequate. She buys a house that Erin and Ben convert into a welcoming school setting. Artist Graham Carraway creates a mural for its cafetorium.
113	3	"The Garden Shed"	January 12, 2025
To accommodate visiting grandparents, a family attempts to renovate a garden shed into a guest house. A major termite infestation forces the Napiers to reduce the shed to its brick floor and build a new structure on top of it.
114	4	"There's No Place Like Home"	January 19, 2025
For the first time in the series, the Napiers return to a home they previously renovated. In an episode that aired in 2017 titled "Military Family Finds Small Town Charm in Mississippi" (see season 1, episode 10 above) they partially redid the "Carson House". The Carsons have moved and sold the home to Scott and Linda, a couple from California that are relocating to Laurel. The new owners spend over $500,000 on the project and have the Napiers build a master-suite addition, carport, and porch, but leave untouched the renovations from eight years previous.
115	5	"A Hemingway House"	January 26, 2025
Whitney Meeks, a military lawyer, has $215,000 to spend on a renovation that he wants to emulate the style of Ernest Hemingway's Key West home. The Napiers do only half of the house as Meeks and his father want to take on a DIY challenge of working on the rest.
116	6	"Woodsy and Whimsical"	February 2, 2025
Lane Bounds, her two daughters, and her rescue dogs live in a rustic cabin on a pond outside Laurel. To expand their property, the Napiers must take down a large tree, but they get chainsaw artist Dayton Scoggins to make a sculpture out of it.
117	7	"Work Of Art"	February 16, 2025
Debbie and Greg Ewen are living in a camper, with three therapy dogs, and are feeling cramped for space. The Napiers find a home for them with a large fenced yard. And Ben builds a custom kitchen island for Debbie that features a hidden marble slab for preparing cookies.
118	8	"Making the Nest"	February 23, 2025
Mary Claire and Will Buck are moving from Jackson, Mississippi, to Laurel where he is starting a new job at a hospital. They have a $600,000 budget to renovate a large home to make room for a baby that is on the way and will join their young son. The Napiers rush to complete the work before the new baby is born. Ben fabricates a large headboard from parquet flooring taken from the house.
119	9	"Home Town Intervention"	March 2, 2025
A couple has begun work on a house, but need Ben and Erin's help to finish it.
120	10	"Saving the Homestead"	April 20, 2025
121	11	"Treehouses and Tangled Hair"	April 27, 2025
122	12	"Blast From the Past"	May 4, 2025
123	13	"Darlin' Cottage"	May 11, 2025
124	14	"Let the Good Times Roll"	May 18, 2025
125	15	"Making a Splash"	May 25, 2025
126	16	"Everything's Coming Up Roses"	May 18, 2025

=== Season 10 (2026) ===
No. overall	No. in season	Title	Original release date
127	1	"The Biggest Yet (part 1)"	January 4, 2026
128	2	"The Biggest Yet (part 2)"	January 11, 2026
129	3	"Coastal Cabin"	January 18, 2026
130	4	"City Siblings"	January 25, 2026
131	5	"Funky Country House"	February 1, 2026
132	6	"Control Freak's Cabin"	February 15, 2026
133	7	"The Wedding"	February 22, 2026
134	8	"Little Brother on a Budget"	March 1, 2026
135	9	"Labor of Love"	March 8, 2026
136	10	"Steel Magnolia"	March 15, 2026

== Spin-offs ==
=== Home Town Takeover ===
A spin-off, titled Home Town Takeover, premiered in 2021. Season one of the six-episode spinoff featured the Napiers working with Wetumpka, Alabama to renovate multiple homes and public spaces within its town. For season two in 2023, the "takeover" was recorded in Fort Morgan, Colorado. Season three (2025) features the takeover of Sebring, Florida.

In June 2025, Rogers Sports & Media announced that it had ordered Home Town Takeover Canada for its new HGTV channel from RTR Media. Rogers later announced that Bryan Baeumler (a former personality of Home Network, the previous Canadian incarnation of HGTV) and his wife Sarah would host Home Town Takeover Canada, which will take place in Port Alberni, British Columbia.

=== Home Town: Ben's Workshop ===
On December 3, 2020, it was announced that a spin-off titled Home Town: Ben's Workshop would premiere on January 4, 2021 on Discovery+. During 2021, eight episodes were released.

== Reception ==
In 2023, Home Town was ranked by the Agent Wealth Hustle website as the best real estate show for their client agents to watch.
