= Blue Mountain, Ontario =

Blue Mountain, Ontario may refer to:

- Blue Mountain (ski resort), a ski resort
- The Blue Mountains, Ontario, a town
- Blue Mountain Formation or Whitby Formation, a geological outcrop in Ontario, Canada

== See also ==
- Blue Mountain (disambiguation)
- Blue Mountains (disambiguation)
