= Karim Debbagh =

Moroccan film producer

- Born: January 25, 1972 (age 54); Tangier, Morocco
- Occupation: Film producer
- Years active: 1997–present

Karim Debbagh (born January 25, 1972, in Tangier) is a Moroccan film producer.

== Life and work ==
In 1997 Debbagh went to Germany to study Film Production at the Film Academy Baden-Württemberg. In 2002 he finished his studies, and received his diploma. Afterward. Debbagh worked as line producer and unit production manager in Germany. Debbagh returned to his hometown of Tangier in 2003. There he founded his production company Kasbah-Films Tangier GmbH, which has produced and coproduced various international films.

== Personal life ==
Karim Debbagh was a friend of the American composer and author Paul Bowles.

Debbagh has been linked to several independent and studio-related film projects.

== Filmography ==
Year	Title	Director	Notes
1993	Am Strand von Merkela	Frieder Schlaich	Short
1995	Paul Bowles - Halbmond	Irene von Alberti & Frieder Schlaich (2)	
1997	Gegenwelt Rauschgift	Peter Leippe	TV movie
1998	Inner City Blues	Marc Schölermann	Short
2000	Walpurgisnacht	Jonas Greulich	Short
2000	Tanger - Legende einer Stadt	Peter Goedel	Documentary
2001	Morakko und der beste Mensch der Welt	Sven Abel	
2002	Liveschaltung	Michael Dreher	Short
2004	Soundless	Mennan Yapo	
2004	SommerHundeSöhne	Cyril Tuschi	
2004	Rain Is Falling	Holger Ernst	Short
2004	Der Stich des Skorpion	Stephan Wagner	TV movie
2005	Herencia flamenca	Michael Meert	Documentary
2006	Klang der Ewigkeit	Bastian Clevé	
2006	Fair Trade	Michael Dreher (2)	Short
2006	Unter kaiserlicher Flagge	Jürgen Stumpfhaus	TV movie
2006	Durchbruch bei Suez	Axel Engstfeld	Documentary
2006	Paul Bowles' Moroccan Friends	Karim Debbagh & Frieder Schlaich (3)	Documentary
2006	Mädchengeschichten	Irene von Alberti (2)	TV series (1 episode)
2007	Fata Morgana	Simon Groß	
2007	Chambr'a	Rachid Cheikh	Short
2007	Blut und Honig	Wolfgang Bergmann, Kai Christiansen & Irene Langemann	Documentary
2007	Die Juden - Geschichte eines Volkes	Sabine Klauser & Nina Koshofer	TV series (5 episodes)
2008	The Objective	Daniel Myrick	
2008	Kronos. Ende und Anfang	Olav F. Wehling	
2008	Tangerine	Irene von Alberti (3)	
2008	The African Twintowers	Christoph Schlingensief	Documentary
2009	Die zwei Leben des Daniel Shore	Michael Dreher	
2009	Ceasefire	Lancelot von Naso	
2009	The 8	Several	
2010	Zohra: A Moroccan Fairy Tale	Barney Platts-Mills	
2010	The Taking of Prince Harry	Alexander Marengo	TV movie
2010	Die Frau des Schläfers	Edzard Onneken	TV movie
2010	Romanzo criminale – La serie	Stefano Sollima	TV series (1 episode)
2010	Gesichter des Islam		TV series (1 episode)
2011	Black Brown White	Erwin Wagenhofer	
2011	Traitors	Sean Gullette	Short
2011	Coup de soleil	Karim Debbagh (2)	Short
2011	Das Mädchen auf dem Meeresgrund	Ben Verbong	TV movie
2011	Flirtcamp	Oliver Dommenget	TV movie
2011	Fischer fischt Frau	Lars Jessen	TV movie
2012	Say Goodbye to the Story (ATT 1/11)	Christoph Schlingensief (2)	Short
2012	The Curse	Fyzal Boulifa	Short
2012	AL Hadaf-La Cible	Munir Abbar	Short
2012	Willkommen im Krieg	Oliver Schmitz	TV movie
2012	The Kidnap Diaries	Norman Hull	TV movie
2012	Trigger Point	Matthias Hoene	TV series (1 episode)
2013	Exit Marrakech	Caroline Link	
2013	The Patrol	Tom Petch	
2013	Traitors	Sean Gullette (2)	
2013	Anashim Ketumim	Hanna Azoulay Hasfari	
2013	Open Desert	Robert Krause	
2013	Die verbotene Frau	Hansjörg Thurn	TV movie
2013	Afghanistan: A Murderous Decision	Raymond Ley	Documentary
2014	The Cut	Fatih Akin	
2014	Die Mamba	Ali Samadi Ahadi	
2014	Hercules Reborn	Nick Lyon	
2014	Three Stones for Jean Genet	Frieder Schlaich (4)	Documentary
2014	The Red Tent	Roger Young	TV mini-series
2015	Never Let Go	Howard J. Ford	
2015	Fatal News	Kilian Riedhof	TV movie
2016	A Hologram for the King	Tom Tykwer	
2016	Army of One	Larry Charles	
2017	The Yellow Birds	Alexandre Moors	
2017	High Wire Act	Brad Anderson	
2017	Backstabbing for Beginners	Per Fly	
2017	The Nile Hilton Incident	Tarik Saleh	
2017	Blackline: The Beirut Contract	Christian Johnston	
2018	Untitled Arab Spring Project	Jason Wulfsohn	
2022	The Damned Don’t Cry	Fyzal Boulifa	
2023	Seneca – On the Creation of Earthquakes	Robert Schwentke	

== Awards ==
- 2012: Dubai International Film Festival - Nominated for the Muhr Arab Award in the category Best Film - Short for The Curse
- 2013: Tangier Mediterranean Short Film Festival - Festival Award in the category Best Film for AL Hadaf-La Cible
