= Gullette =

Gullette is a surname. Notable people with the surname include:

- Margaret Morganroth Gullette (born 1941), American cultural critic
- Sean Gullette (born 1968), American film director, writer, screenwriter, actor, and producer
