= Roots (Blue Mountain album) =

Studio album by Blue Mountain
- Released: 2001
- Recorded: Money Shot
- Genre: Americana
- Length: 37:34
- Labels: Blue Mountain, Glitterhouse
- Producer: Blue Mountain

Blue Mountain chronology
Tales of a Traveler (1999)	Roots (2001)	Tonight It's Now or Never (2002)

Roots is an album by the American band Blue Mountain, released in 2001.

== Critical reception ==
Professional ratings
Review scores
Source	Rating
AllMusic	3/5 stars

The Washington Post stated that "the songs are reawakened by loose, spirited garage-rock arrangements dominated by [Cary] Hudson's singing, lead guitar work and newly prominent fiddling." The News-Gazette called the album "a brilliant example of Americana at its finest."

== Track listing ==
1. "Rye Whiskey" - 3:47
2. "Rain and Snow" - 3:44
3. "Black Is the Color of My True Love's Hair" - 5:03
4. "Banks of the Pontchartrain" - 5:00
5. "That Nasty Swing" (by Cliff Carlisle) - 3:20
6. "Spring of '65" - 4:13
7. "Riley and Spencer" - 3:20
8. "Young and Tender Ladies" - 3:36
9. "I'm Thinking Tonight of My Blue Eyes" (by A.P. Carter) - 2:30
10. "Little Stream of Whiskey" - 3:03
11. "Go Away Devil" (Bonus track) - 5:47
12. "Shady Grove" (Bonus track) - 5:55
13. "Country Blues" (by Dock Boggs) (Bonus track) - 5:21
14. "900 Miles" (Bonus track) - 3:04

All songs are traditional, except tracks 5, 9, 13, as indicated. All songs arranged by Blue Mountain.

== Personnel ==
- Cary Hudson – vocals, guitar, violin, harmonica
- Laurie Stirratt – guitar, bass guitar, vocals
- George Sheldon – bass guitar, vocals, piano
- Frank Coutch – drums, percussion, lead vocals on "Little Stream of Whiskey"
- Dave Boyer – mandolin on "Rye Whiskey"
- Robert Chaffe (of Kudzu Kings) – keyboards on "Rain and Snow"
