= Sean Gullette =

American actor

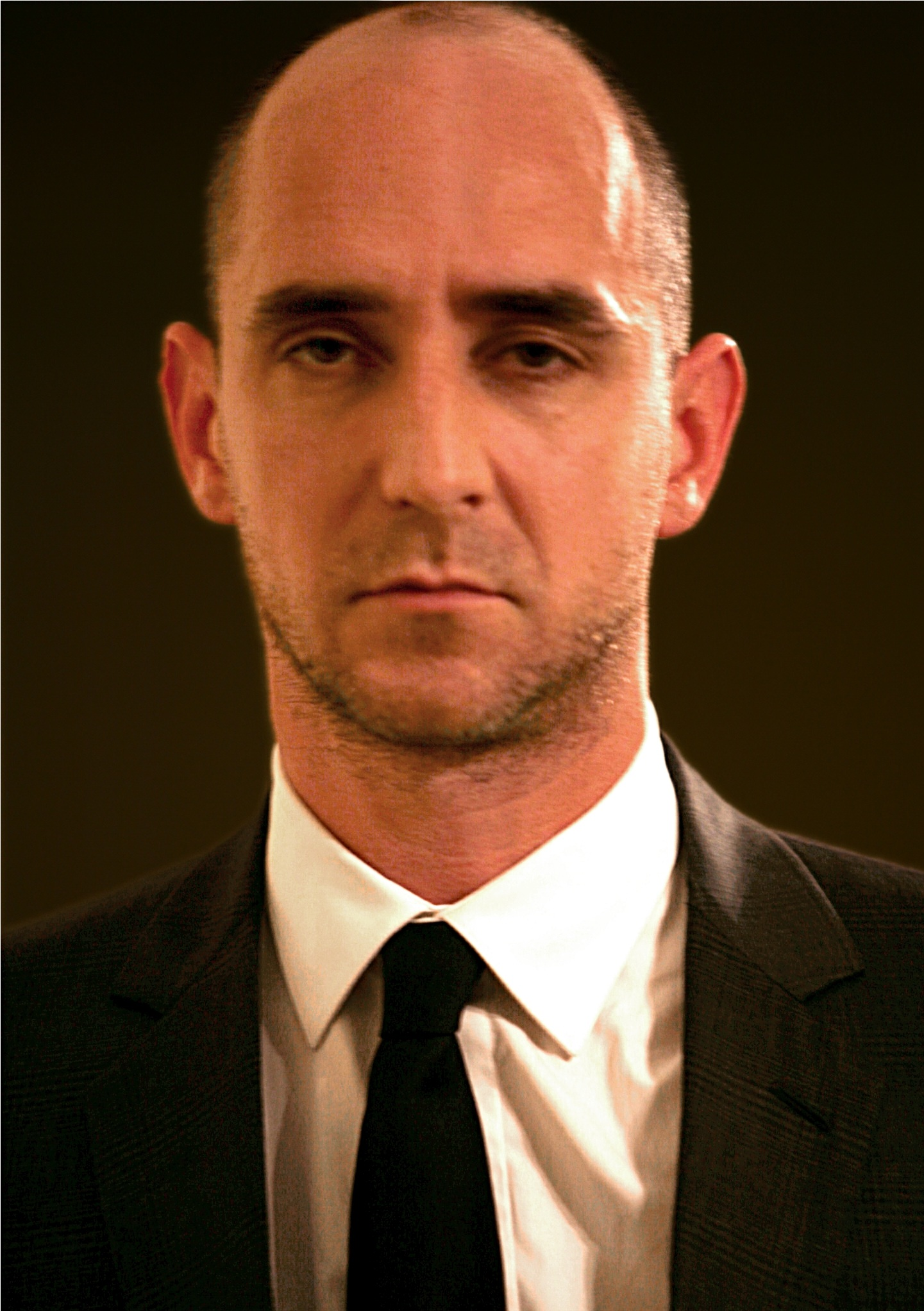
- Born: Sean Leland Sebastian Gullette; June 4, 1968 (age 58); Boston, Massachusetts
- Education: Harvard University (BA)
- Occupations: writer, filmmaker, actor, producer
- Years active: 1998–present
- Spouse: Yto Barrada
- Children: 2

Sean Leland Sebastian Gullette (born June 4, 1968) is an American film director, writer, screenwriter, actor, and producer.

== Film directing ==
Gullette is slated to direct Upland, adapted from the novel Nip the Buds, Shoot the Kids by Nobel Prize–winning Japanese author Kenzaburō Ōe, for an upcoming international co-production. Attached cast include Forrest Goodluck and Paul Sparks.

Gullette's first feature film, Traitors, starring Chaimae Ben Acha, Soufia Issami, Mourade Zeguindi, Driss Roukhe and Saleh Bensaleh was released internationally. The film was shot on locations in Tangier, Morocco and the hashish producing Rif mountains. It made its world premiere at the 2013 Venice Film Festival, and screened in competition at the Stockholm Film Festival and at the Marrakech International Film Festival, the Dubai Film Festival, and the Tribeca Film Festival. The film was distributed by Rezo Films, Paris and in the US by Film Movement. Traitors received positive reviews from critics and has a "Fresh" rating of 88% on Rotten Tomatoes. "To keep her parents from being evicted and fund her Clash-inspired punk band, Malika takes a job smuggling drugs over the mountains. Her partner in the run is a world-weary veteran drug mule, who unexpectedly wins Malika's sympathy."

Gullette was announced at the Cannes Film Festival as the writer-director of Tangier, a film in-development set to star Kristin Scott Thomas and Jeremy Irons. The status of the project is currently unknown.

== Producing ==
Gullette conceived and executive produced the landmark doc series Black Gold with Protozoa Pictures and TIME Studios. "BLACK GOLD is the story of the coverup of the century - of the boss atop a trillion-dollar industry who discovered a shocking truth 40 years ago, created a black ops conspiracy to hide the evidence, and would stop at nothing to keep the money flowing, while the world burned..."

Gullette is the Consulting Producer on OUTRIDER [2025] a documentary about iconic poet/performer/activist Anne Waldman, directed by Alystyre Julian, from Executive Producer Martin Scorsese and Producer Sarah Riggs. He is also Consulting Producer on SPARKS [2026] directed by Fergus Campbell and produced by Lola Lafia, starring Elsie Fisher and Charlie Foster.

Gullette produced The 8 with Sarah Riggs and Blaire Dessent; the film was selected for the 2010 Berlin Film Festival. He directed several short films from his own scripts. He produced False Start by Yto Barrada which premiered at the Toronto Film Festival and went on to win a Tiger Award at the 2016 Rotterdam Film Festival and Tree Identification for Beginners also by Barrada which premiered at Rotterdam 2018.

Gullette produced Nicole Zaray's gender-inverted short film Joe's Day, featuring Deborah Harry. He wrote produced Thanksgiving, starring Yolonda Ross, James Urbaniak and Seymour Cassel.

== Screenwriting ==
His feature film screenwriting projects have included Trinity, Conviction, Monopolis and Kilroy. He wrote "New York Stories" for Donna Karan's DKNY, and directed the "Von Hummer the 1st" series of promotional spots for VH1, starring James Urbaniak. He has also consulted on screenplays for Warner Bros., Paramount, and independent productions. IMDB reports Gullette as the screenwriter of the upcoming Olivier Megaton film Land of the Living.

== Television ==
In 2019, Gullette directed two episodes of the ABC Television series 1969. Gullette wrote that "Was quite an adventure to direct this hour for ABC TV, which aired in the spring and is now streaming. Thanks to EP Jeanmarie Condon, my segment producers Jesse Rosen and Jackie Filer, senior producer Erica Salit, editors Doug Quade and Alessandro Barnett and the team at Lincoln Square Productions. Despite the title, everyone signed on to resist the grotesque Manson Industry and instead listen closely to the stories of two fascinating — and very different — women who joined the group. Both Dianne Lake and Lynette "Squeaky" Fromme sat for powerful, revealing interviews. Our re-reading of the Manson myth is also carried by Peter Fonda, rock author Lizzy Goodman, VIBE editor Desiree Thompson, Woodstock founder Michael Lang, John Fogerty of Creedence, and Tariq Trotter of The Roots."

== Acting ==
His professional work in film began in 1998, when he co-wrote and played the lead role in the award-winning Pi, directed by longtime collaborator Darren Aronofsky. He has since played principal and supporting roles in some twenty films including Brad Anderson's Happy Accidents (with Vincent D'Onofrio and Marisa Tomei) and Darren Aronofsky's Requiem for a Dream (with Jennifer Connelly), the German film Toskana Karrussel (with Susanna Lothar) and as a guest actor on network TV dramas. His occasional theater work has included the lead in the New York premiere of Susan Sandler's If I Were a Train.

In 2010 he played principal roles in Blue Ridge, directed by Vincent Sweeney, and Die zwei Leben des Daniel Shore, with Nikolai Kinski and Morjana Alaoui, directed by Michael Dreher.

In 2015 he played supporting roles in the film Zanj Revolution, by Tariq Teguia and in 2013 Rock the Casbah by Laila Marrakshi. In 2025 he returned to acting with supporting roles in four films: COUTURE by Alice Winocour (as the voice of Angelina Jolie's husband on the phone!); SIGHT UNSEEN by Shawn Antoine II (as a Catholic priest in 1970's South Bronx), SEE ME by Cormac Fingeret and BLOOD by Emre and Levent Kucuk.

Gullette performed spoken word pieces on the songs "Song of Alice" from Keren Ann's fourth album, Nolita on Blue Note/Capitol/EMI Records and on Northern Irish DJ and musician David Holmes's album Bow Down to the Exit Sign.

== Personal life ==
Gullette was born in Boston, Massachusetts, the son of Margaret Morganroth Gullette, a cultural critic and writer, and David George Gullette, a professor of English. He attended public schools and Harvard, where he acted in theater and films and directed plays.

Gullette lives between New York City and Tangier, Morocco, and in addition to his film work is the founder of the 212 Society, a US non-profit which supports cultural and educational projects in Morocco, including the Cinémathèque de Tanger and Darna. The 212 Society takes its name from the 212 telephone codes of its home city and adoptive country.

Gullette and artist Yto Barrada are married and have two daughters.

== Other writing ==
Gullette's essays, journalism and fiction have been published in magazines including The Face, Spy, Slate, Bidoun, Brill's Content, Gear, Entertainment Weekly, Nejma, and KGB magazine (which he founded as editor and publisher in 1991.) His essay "Mile High" appears in the NYU Press' book 110 Stories: New York Writes After September 11, and his essay "Notes" appears in the Springer-Verlag anthology Art, Technology, and Cinema. Gullette has ghostwritten for visual artists, and edited texts for the walls and publications of MoMA, the Whitney Biennial, the Tate Modern, and the Centre Pompidou, Paris.

== Filmography ==
- Sean Gullette at IMDb

== Awards and nominations ==
Rotterdam International Film Festival Nominated, Tiger Award 2014

Cyprus Film Days International Festival Nominated, Glocal Images Best Film Award for Traitors (2013)

Ft. Lauderdale International Film Festival Won, Spirit of the Independent Award Feature Film for Traitors (2013)

Gijón International Film Festival Won, "Rellumes" Prize 2014

Philadelphia Independent Film Festival, US Nominated, Best Feature Film 2013

Bratislava International Film Festival Nominated, Grand Prix 2013

Marrakech International Film Festival Nominated, Best Director Nominated, Golden Star Best Feature Film for Traitors (2013) 2013

Stockholm Film Festival Nominated, Bronze Horse Best Film for Traitors (2013) 2013

Venice Film Festival Nominated, Fedeora Award Best Film (Venice Days) for Traitors (2013) Won, Lina Mangiacapre Award - Special Mention 1999

Online Film & Television Association Nominated, OFTA Film Award Best Breakthrough Performance: Male for Pi (1998) Nominated, OFTA Film Award Best Sci-Fi/Fantasy/Horror Actor for Pi (1998)
