= Tales of a Traveler =

Studio album by Blue Mountain
- Released: October 5, 1999
- Recorded: Sweet Tea, Oxford, Mississippi; Route One, Monticello, Mississippi; Teatro, Oxnard, California
- Genres: Country rock, Southern rock
- Length: 47:03
- Label: Roadrunner
- Producers: Dan Baird, Blue Mountain

Blue Mountain chronology
Home Grown (1997)	Tales of a Traveler (1999)	Roots (2001)

Tales of a Traveler is an album by the American alternative country group Blue Mountain, released in 1999.

== Critical reception ==
Professional ratings
Review scores
Source	Rating
AllMusic	4/5 stars

No Depression wrote that Stirratt and Hudson's "harmonies, and, just as importantly, the subtle, fleeting moments when their voices veer off course are Blue Mountain’s musical signature." The Washington Post thought that "Hudson and Stirratt borrow widely and wisely—grabbing elements from X, Johnny Cash, Lynyrd Skynyrd, J.J. Cale and especially Neil Young, both in his pretty acoustic and noisy electric phases—but they give it all backwoods Mississippi spin and make it intensely personal." Exclaim! noted that the band "even venture into Dixie-fried rock territory, albeit in a mercifully less greasy form than the Molly Hatchets of yesteryear."

== Track listing ==
All tracks are written by Cary Hudson and Laurie Stirratt.

No.	Title	Length
1.	"When You're Not Mine"	3:42
2.	"Poppa"	3:32
3.	"Comic Book Kid"	4:28
4.	"Lakeside"	4:22
5.	"I Don't Wanna Say Goodnight"	3:27
6.	"Sleepin' in My Shoes"	2:41
7.	"The One That Got Away"	2:58
8.	"My Wicked, Wicked Ways"	5:14
9.	"Room 829"	4:39
10.	"Hermit of the Hidden Beach"	3:59
11.	"Death Is a Fisherman"	3:39
12.	"Just Passing Through"	4:18

== Personnel ==
- Cary Hudson – guitars, vocals, organ, harmonica, violin, piano
- Laurie Stirratt – guitars, vocals, bass
- George Sheldon – bass, vocals, piano
- Frank Coutch – drums, vocals, percussion

Additional personnel

- Caroline Herring – vocals (track 12)
- Jim Spake – tenor saxophone (track 6), baritone saxophone (track 6)
- Jef Callaway – trombone (track 12)
- Dan Baird – acoustic guitar (track 1), electric guitar (track 11), slide guitar (track 12)
- Don Heffington – drums (track 8), congas (track 8)
