= Mast (naval) =

Ship's communication structure

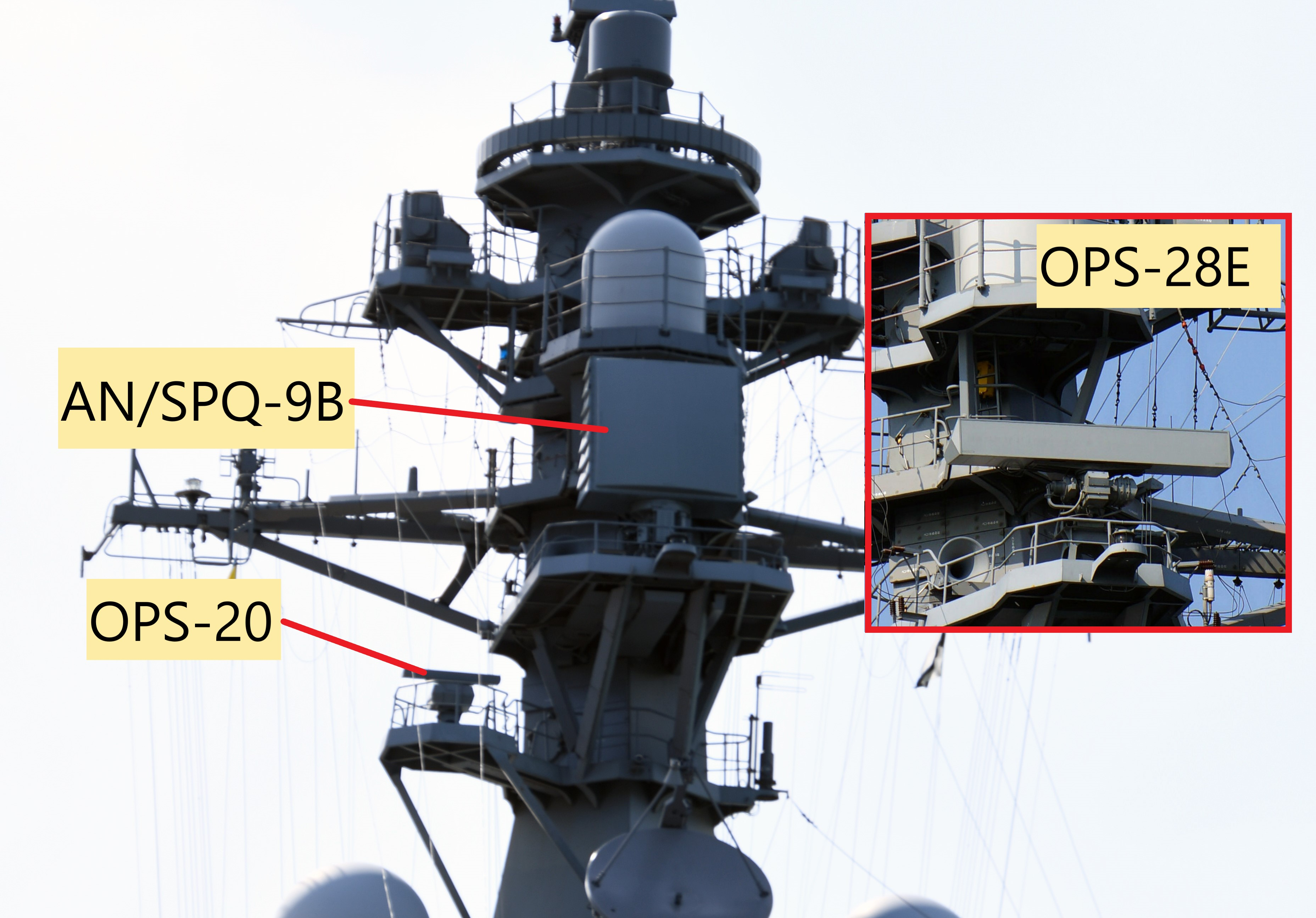
Mast aboard JS Atago (DDG-177)

The mast of a modern ship remains as an important part of a ship's construction despite no longer requiring a vertical spar for carrying a physical sail.

== Use of masts on modern ships ==
After the end of the Age of Sail, steamships retained masts as ship to ship communications still relied on lights and signal flags, including commissioning pennants, house flags, and courtesies. Warships also used them as observation posts for spotters, and to hold fire control equipment such as rangefinders.

As communication technology advanced, ships' masts served as a convenient mounting location for radar and telecommunication antennas, which benefit from a higher mounting location to increase range. The masts themselves have also evolved from the bare pole of a simplified sailing mast, to the robust tripod, lattice, and pagoda masts of World War II, the combined mast and exhaust stack, to the enclosed masts on contemporary warships intended to reduce a ship's radar cross section, and in the arches and masts on merchant vessels and superyachts today.

On an operational naval platform, one can find UHF, and VLF antennas, marine and navigation radar, fire control, electronic warfare and countermeasures, combat identification systems, FLIR, and even satellite internet access and GPS, each which must be carefully positioned so their signals do not interfere with each other, or by the ship’s itself. Increased weight aloft and large flat surfaces can also affect stability and performance.

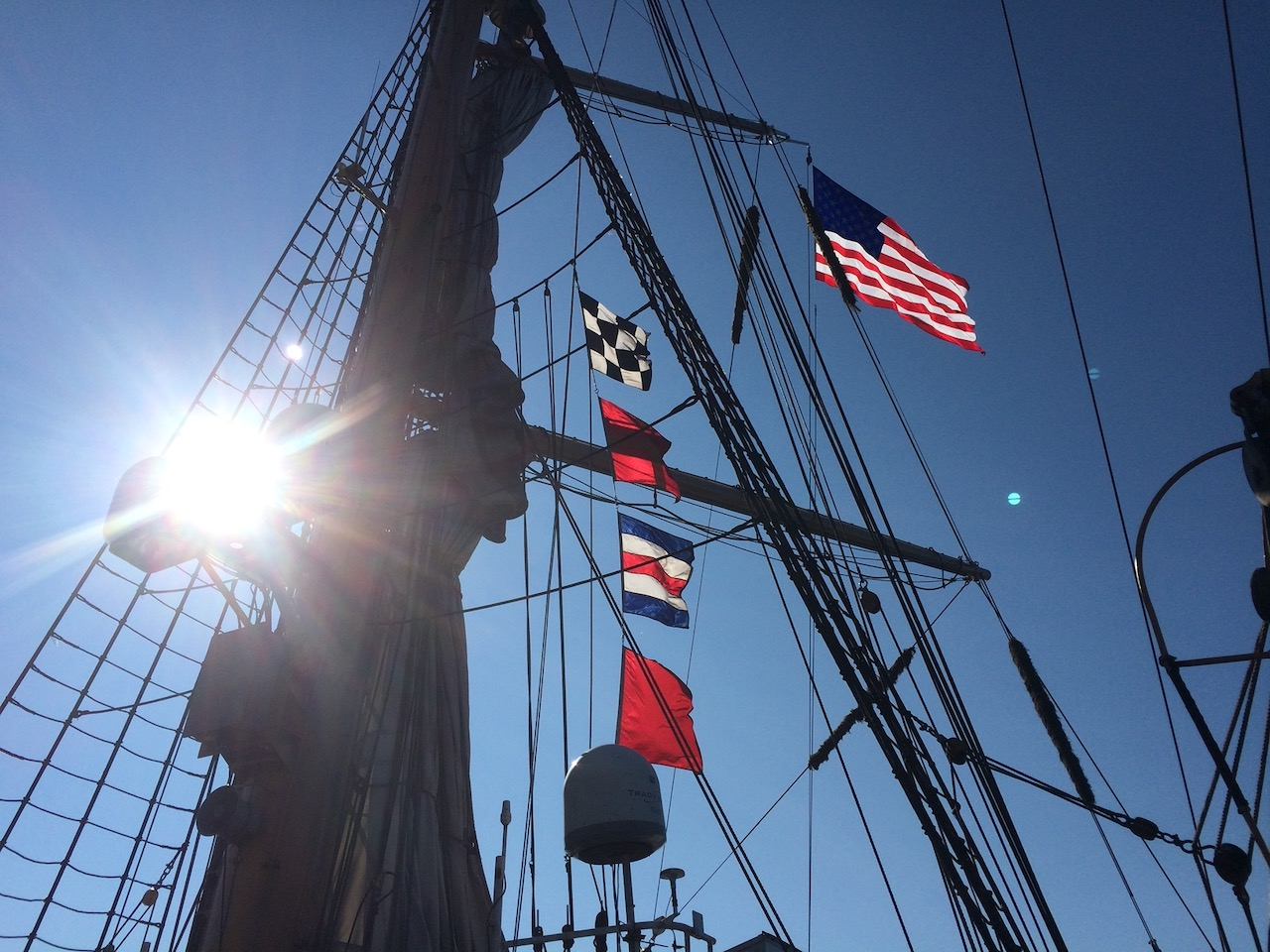
USCGC Eagle illustrates traditional use of masts both for sailing and communication

The need for maintenance access and cooling are also considerations in determining if an enclosed mast is warranted, with the United States Navy, People's Liberation Army Navy, and the merchant navy often determining that the advantages are not worth the cost, and have continued to build ships with traditional open masts, as seen on the proposed Constellation-class frigates.

Much as sailors in the age of sail could identify ships on the horizon by the cut of their jib, different mast designs between similar classes of ships can help visually ascertain a ship's identity at a distance.

Flags also still serve an important part in Navy protocols, with half a dozen flag halyards typically rigged to a naval mast in addition to the main flag halyard. Port halyards are generally used for identifying flags, such as their military call sign or unique unit flags, and the starboard halyards used for communications such as a courtesy flag, maritime signals, and private codes.

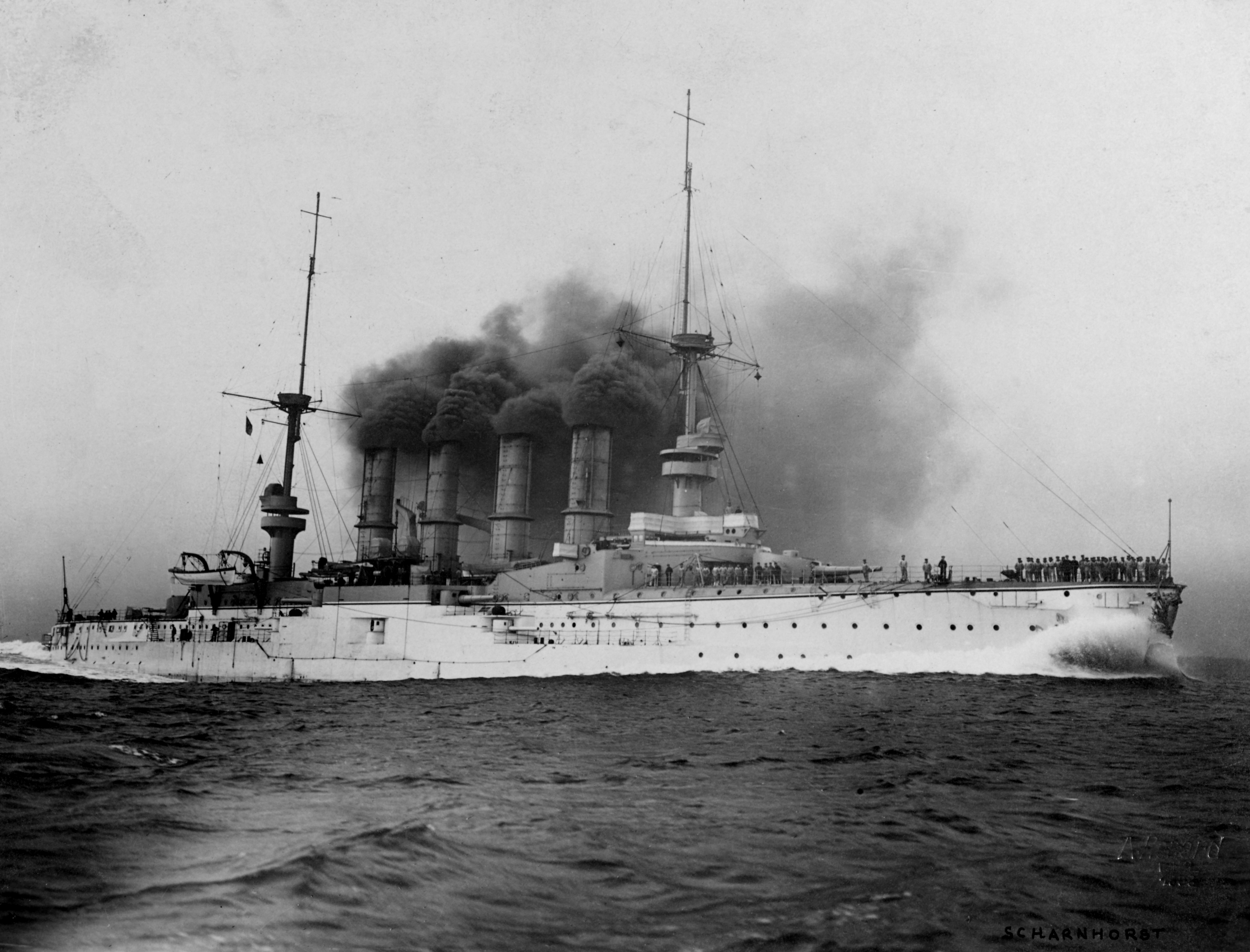
SMS Scharnhorst with pole masts

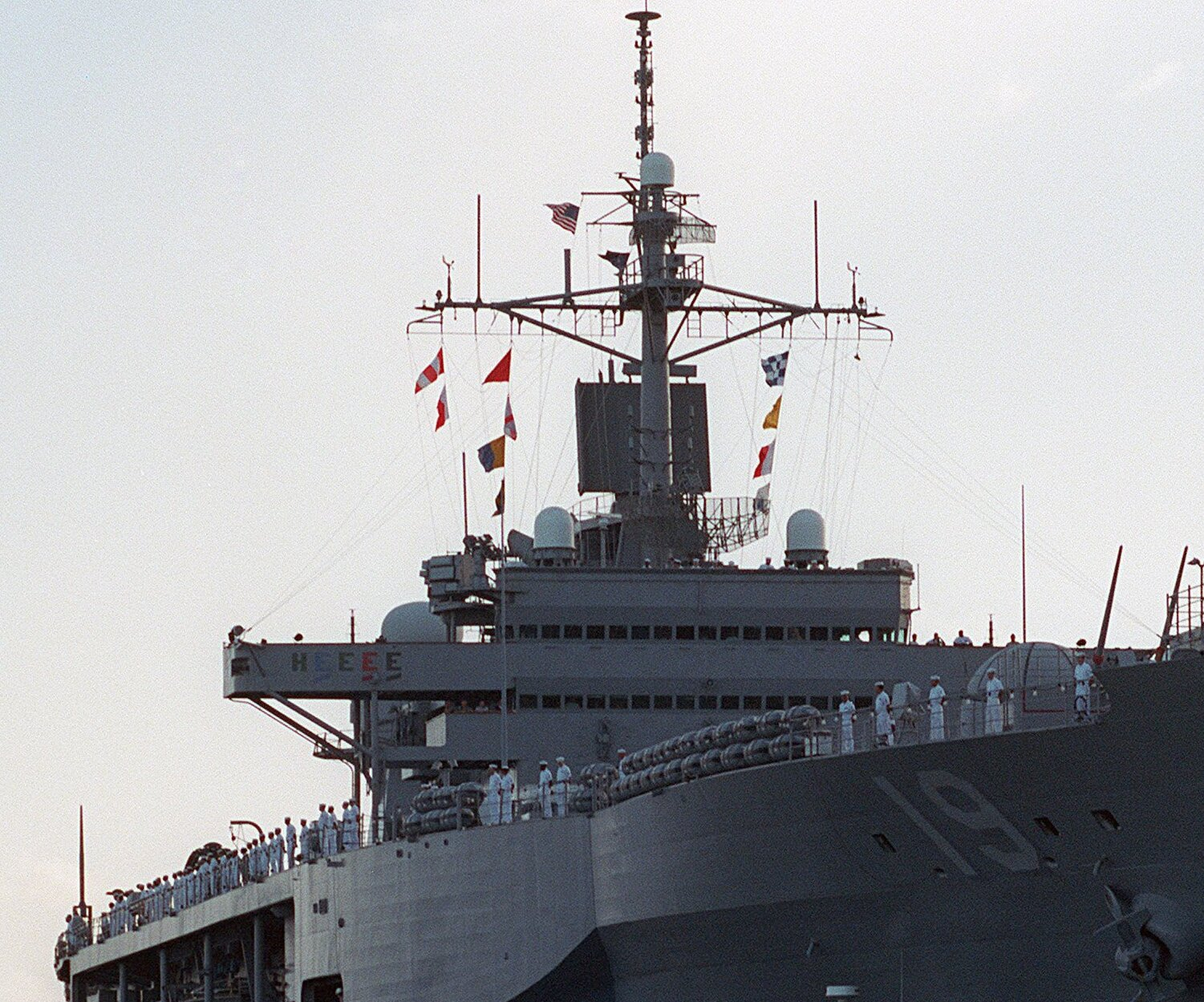
USS Blue Ridge displaying signal flags

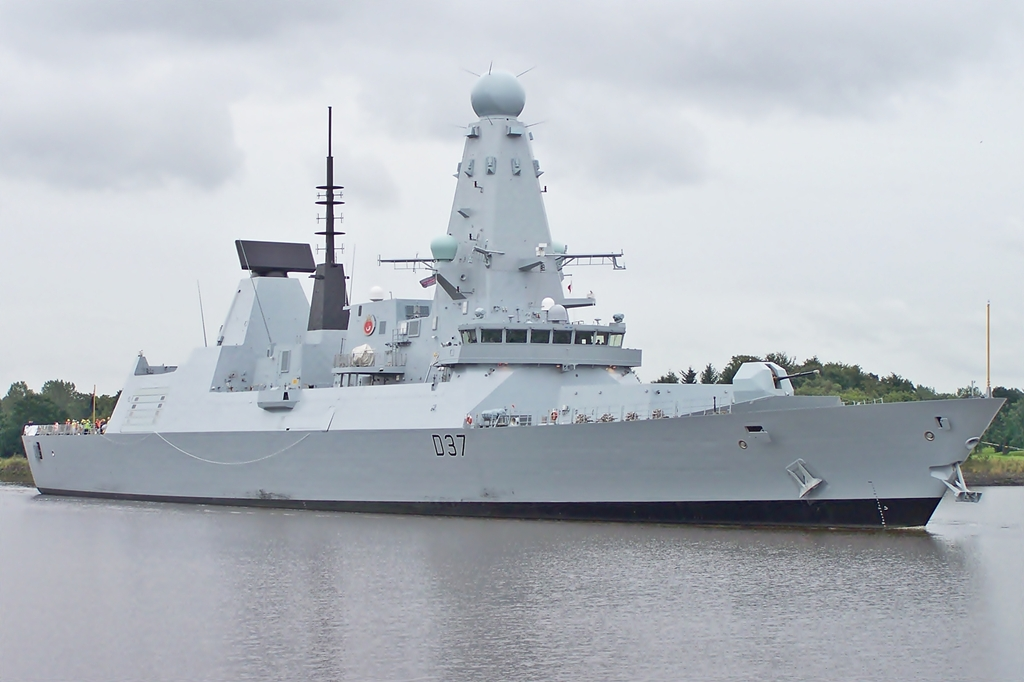
Modern enclosed mast of HMS Duncan

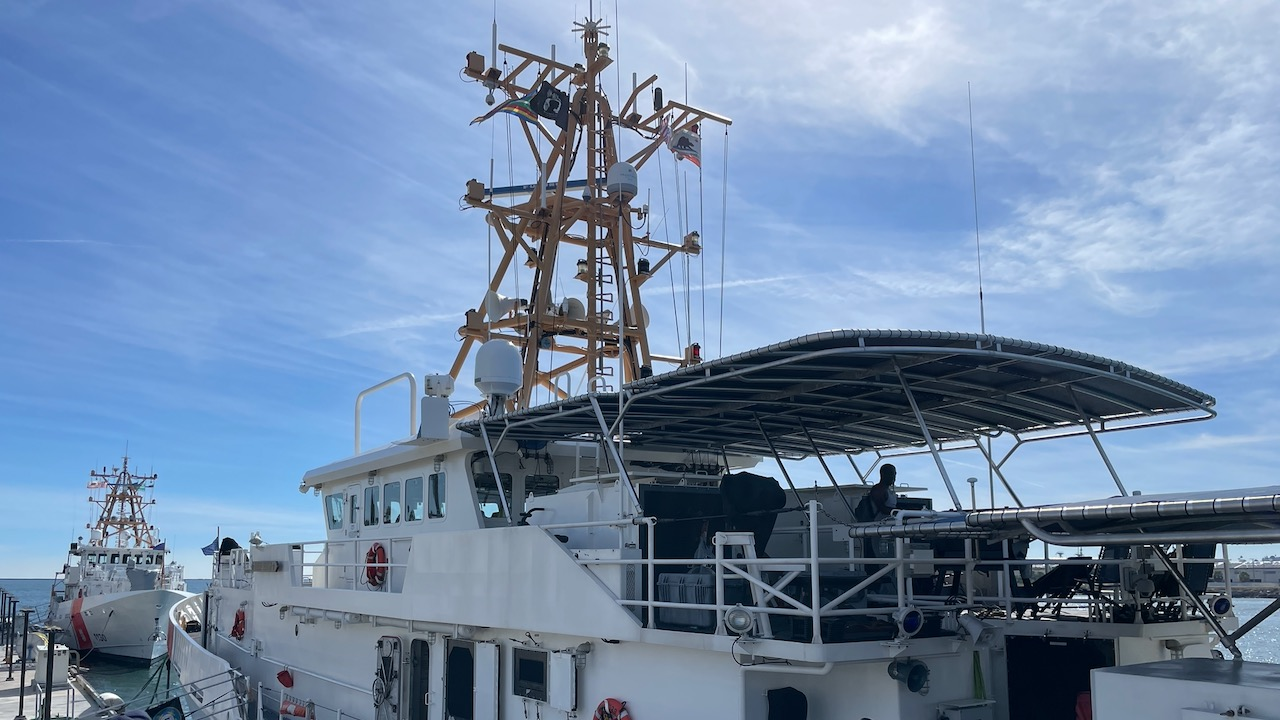
The mast of a USCG Sentinel-class cutter

== See also ==
- Combat information center
- Maritime call sign
- Mast stepping
- Naval flag signalling
- Superstructure
- Warship
