= Blue Mountain Township, Arkansas =

Blue Mountain Township, Arkansas may refer to:

- Blue Mountain Township, Logan County, Arkansas
- Blue Mountain Township, Stone County, Arkansas

== See also ==
- List of townships in Arkansas
- Blue Mountain (disambiguation)
