= A Life Full of Holes =

2008 autobiography by Driss Ben Hamed Charhadi

- Author: Driss Ben Hamed Charhadi
- Translator: Paul Bowles
- Language: English
- Genre: Fiction
- Publisher: Ecco
- Publication date: 1964
- Pages: 352
- ISBN: 978-0061565298

A Life Full of Holes is the autobiography of Moroccan storyteller Driss Ben Hamed Charhadi, as told to and translated by Paul Bowles (from Charhadi's Maghrebi Arabic) and published in 1964.

Charhadi became an acquaintance of Bowles, an American writer and traveler, in Tangier. He convinced Bowles that he had an interesting life story to tell; in turn, Bowles taped, edited, transcribed, and published the account after first publishing a few of Charhadi's anecdotes, which met with success. Bowles called Charhadi's account a "novel"; later, he explained that this was done at the behest of the publisher, in order to qualify it for some literary prize.

A contemporary reviewer named "B. H.", in Prairie Schooner, called the book unsuccessful as a novel, criticizing its language and narrative structure, which it deemed "simple". B. H. claimed that the narrator did not seem to be aware of himself and his own life: "The narrator seems unaware of possible relationships between past and present, between contemporaneous events, and between his life and events in the world around him"—the book's value is limited to "provid[ing] illuminating insights into primitivistic habits of mind". Mary Martin Rountree, in an article discussing the entirety of Bowles's work in translating Maghrebi stories, said it was an "altogether astonishing feat of sustained storytelling", and cites from the introduction, with approbation: "Bowles accurately singles out Charhadi's gifts in his introduction to A Life Full of Holes: 'The good storyteller keeps the thread of his narrative almost taut at all points. This Charhadi accomplished, apparently effort. He never hesitated; he never varied the intensity eloquence'".

== See also ==
- A Life Full of Holes: The Strait Project, by French Moroccan artist Yto Barrada
