= Tonight It's Now or Never =

Tonight It's Now Or Never

Live album by Blue Mountain
- Released: August 13, 2002
- Recorded: March 11, 2001
- Venue: Schubas Tavern
- Genre: Alternative country, country rock, roots rock, Southern rock
- Label: DCN Records
- Producer: Blue Mountain

Blue Mountain chronology
Roots (2001)	Tonight It's Now Or Never (2002)

Professional ratings
Review scores
Source	Rating
AllMusic	4/5 stars

Tonight It's Now or Never is a 2002 live album by American alternative country band Blue Mountain. In a review for AllMusic, critic Matt Fink called the album "a fitting coda for one of alternative country's pioneering bands" and "one of the band's final moments".
