= Rüdiger Heinze =

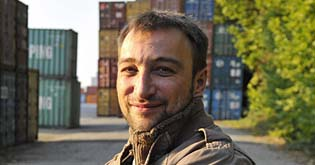
- Born: December 14, 1971 (age 54); Riesa, Bezirk Dresden, East Germany
- Occupations: Film producer, screenwriter
- Years active: 1997 - present

Rüdiger Heinze (born December 14, 1971, in Riesa, East Germany) is a film producer and screenwriter.

== Life and work ==
In 1997 he went to Ludwigsburg to study film direction and later film production at the Film Academy Baden-Württemberg. In 2003 Rüdiger Heinze earned his university degree. He has worked several times as a film director. In 2008 he co-founded the production company Zum Goldenen Lamm.

== Filmography (selection) ==
- 2003: The Troublemaker (Der Ärgermacher) (television producer)
- 2004: Don't Look for Me (Such mich nicht) (film producer)
- 2005: Rabenkinder (TV movie) (film producer)
- 2006: Der Generalmanager oder How To Sell A Tit Wonder (co-director)
- 2007: Blind Flight (Blindflug) (co-producer)
- 2009: Parkour (screenwriter, film producer)
- 2009: The Two Lives of Daniel Shore (film producer)
- 2011: Screams of the Forgotten (TV film; film producer)
- 2012: Draussen ist Sommer (film producer)
- 2013: Wolf Children (Wolfskinder), (film producer)
- 2013: Die Frau, die sich traut (film producer)
- 2014: Be my Baby (film producer)
- 2015: Sanctuary (Freistatt), (film producer)
- 2017: Back for Good (film producer)
- 2019: A Gschicht über d'Lieb (film producer)
- 2019: Now or Never (TV movie), (film producer)

== Awards and nominations ==
- 2001: Winner of the Sat.1 Talent Award for a comedy concept
- 2012: Bavarian TV Awards: Young Talent Award of the LfA Förderbank Bayern for Screams of the Forgotten
