= Die zwei Leben des Daniel Shore =

- Directed by: Michael Dreher
- Written by: Michael Dreher
- Produced by: Karim Debbagh; Rüdiger Heinze; Rainer Kölmel; Stefan Sporbert
- Starring: Nikolai Kinski; Katharina Schüttler; Morjana Alaoui; Sean Gullette
- Cinematography: Ian Blumers
- Edited by: Wolfgang Weigl
- Music by: Lorenz Dangel
- Distributed by: Constantin Film
- Release dates: 29 October 2009 (Hof International Film Festival); 11 February 2010 (Germany)
- Running time: 95 minutes
- Country: Germany
- Language: German

Die zwei Leben des Daniel Shore (The Two Lives of Daniel Shore) is a 2009 German film by Michael Dreher; written by him and produced by Karim Debbagh, Rüdiger Heinze, Rainer Kölmel and Stefan Sporbert. It stars Nikolai Kinski, Katharina Schüttler, Morjana Alaoui and Sean Gullette. The film is Michael Dreher's feature film debut and had its premiere at the 44th Hof International Film Festival.

== Plot ==
Daniel Shore, a 28-year-old German American, is about to spend a few days in the flat of his deceased grandmother. Since his return from Morocco, his mental state has become somewhat unstable. The trip to Morocco was all about getting away from the work-related troubles and his whole miserable life, but now there is even more to worry about, because in Morocco a boy was killed, and Daniel is thinking he might have become an accessory to the crime. Even in the new surrounding, Daniel is haunted by images of what has happened, until everyday situations push him over the edge and soon the past and present become an indistinct blur.

== Cast ==
- Nikolai Kinski as Daniel Shore
- Katharina Schüttler as Elli
- Morjana Alaoui as Imane
- Sean Gullette as Henry Porter
- Judith Engel as Miss Kowalski
- Matthias Matschke as Günther Feige
- Bernd Tauber as Prof. Hübner
- Stefan Lampadius as Gatekeeper
- Meryam Raoui as Imane's friend
- Driss Roukhe as Commandant

== Distribution and response ==
The film premiered on 29 October 2009 at the Hof International Film Festival and was commercially released in Germany on 11 February 2010.

Although there was no international release date up to now, Twitch Film reviewed the trailer of the movie.
