= Exit Marrakech =

2013 film

- Film poster
- Directed by: Caroline Link
- Written by: Caroline Link
- Produced by: Karim Debbagh
- Starring: Ulrich Tukur
- Cinematography: Bella Halben
- Distributed by: StudioCanal
- Release date: 28 June 2013
- Running time: 122 minutes
- Country: Germany
- Languages: German; Arabic

Exit Marrakech is a 2013 German drama film written and directed by Caroline Link. It was screened in the Special Presentation section at the 2013 Toronto International Film Festival.

== Cast ==
- Samuel Schneider as Ben
- Ulrich Tukur as Father
- Hafsia Herzi as Karima
- Josef Bierbichler as Dr. Breuer
- Marie-Lou Sellem as Lea
