= Nilgiri =

Nilgiri, which literally means "Blue Mountain", may refer to:

- Nilgiri Biosphere Reserve, an International Biosphere Reserve in the Western Ghats and Nilgiri Hills ranges of South India
  - Nilgiri mountains, a range of mountains spanning the states of Tamil Nadu and Kerala in Southern India
  - Nilgiri Mountain Railway, Tamil Nadu
  - The Nilgiris District, a region of the Indian state of Tamil Nadu
  - Nilgiri tea, a dark intensely aromatic and flavourful tea grown around the Nilgiris in Tamil Nadu and Kerala in Southern India
- Nilagiri or Nilgiri, a town in Balasore District of the state of Odisha in East India
- Nilgiri (Odisha Vidhan Sabha constituency), Assembly constituency of Odisha, India
- Nilgiris (supermarket), supermarket chain in South India
- Nilgiri Himal, a range of three peaks in the Annapurna region in Nepal
- Nilgiri-class frigate (1972) - class of frigates, served in Indian Navy (1972 – 2013)
  - INS Nilgiri (F33) - Lead ship of her class
- Nilgiri-class frigate (2019) - new class frigates are under construction for Indian Navy
  - INS Nilgiri (2019) - Lead Ship of Nilgiri-class
- Neelagiri, a town in Tamil Nadu, India
- Neelagiri (film), a 1991 Indian film by I. V. Sasi
- Neelagiri Express, a 1968 Indian film
- Nilgiri, a hill resort in the Bandarban District of Bangladesh

== See also ==
- Blue Mountain (disambiguation)
