= Dog Days (Blue Mountain album) =

Studio album by Blue Mountain
- Released: July 25, 1995
- Genre: Alternative country, country rock, roots rock, Southern rock, blues
- Length: 54:24
- Label: Roadrunner
- Producer: Eric Ambel

Blue Mountain chronology
| Blue Mountain (1993) | Dog Days (1995) | Home Grown (1997) |

Professional ratings
Review scores
| Source | Rating |
|---|---|
| AllMusic | 4.5/5 stars |

Dog Days is a 1995 album by American alternative country group Blue Mountain. In 2008 the band released a remastered version of the album. Scott Hull remastered the album. Six bonus tracks were added to the new release, drawing from out of print albums and similar material.

== Track listings ==
=== 1995 release ===
1. Mountain Girl
2. Let's Ride
3. Blue Canoe
4. Soul Sister
5. Wink
6. Slow Suicide
7. A Band Called Bud
8. Epitaph
9. ZZQ
10. The Eyes of a Child
11. Jimmy Carter
12. Let's Go Runnin'
13. Hippy Hotel
14. Special Rider Blues

=== 2008 remastered release ===
1. Mountain Girl
2. Let's Ride
3. Blue Canoe
4. Soul Sister
5. Wink
6. Slow Suicide
7. A Band Called Bud
8. Epitaph
9. ZZQ
10. Eyes of a Child
11. Jimmy Carter
12. Let's Go Runnin'
13. Hippy Hotel
14. Special Rider Blues
15. Broke Down & Busted
16. Song Without a Name
17. Westbound
18. Hermit of the Hidden Beach
19. My Wicked, Wicked Ways
20. To a Toad
