= Yto Barrada =

Multimedia visual artist (born 1971)

- Born: 1971 (age 54–55); Paris, France
- Education: University of Paris (History, Political Science); International Center of Photography
- Occupations: Visual artist; photographer; filmmaker
- Awards: Ellen Auerbach Award (2006); Deutsche Bank Artist of the Year (2011); Robert Gardner Fellowship in Photography (2013); Abraaj Group Art Prize (2015); Tiger Award for Short Films (2016); Roy R. Neuberger Prize (2019); Soros Arts Fellowship (2023)

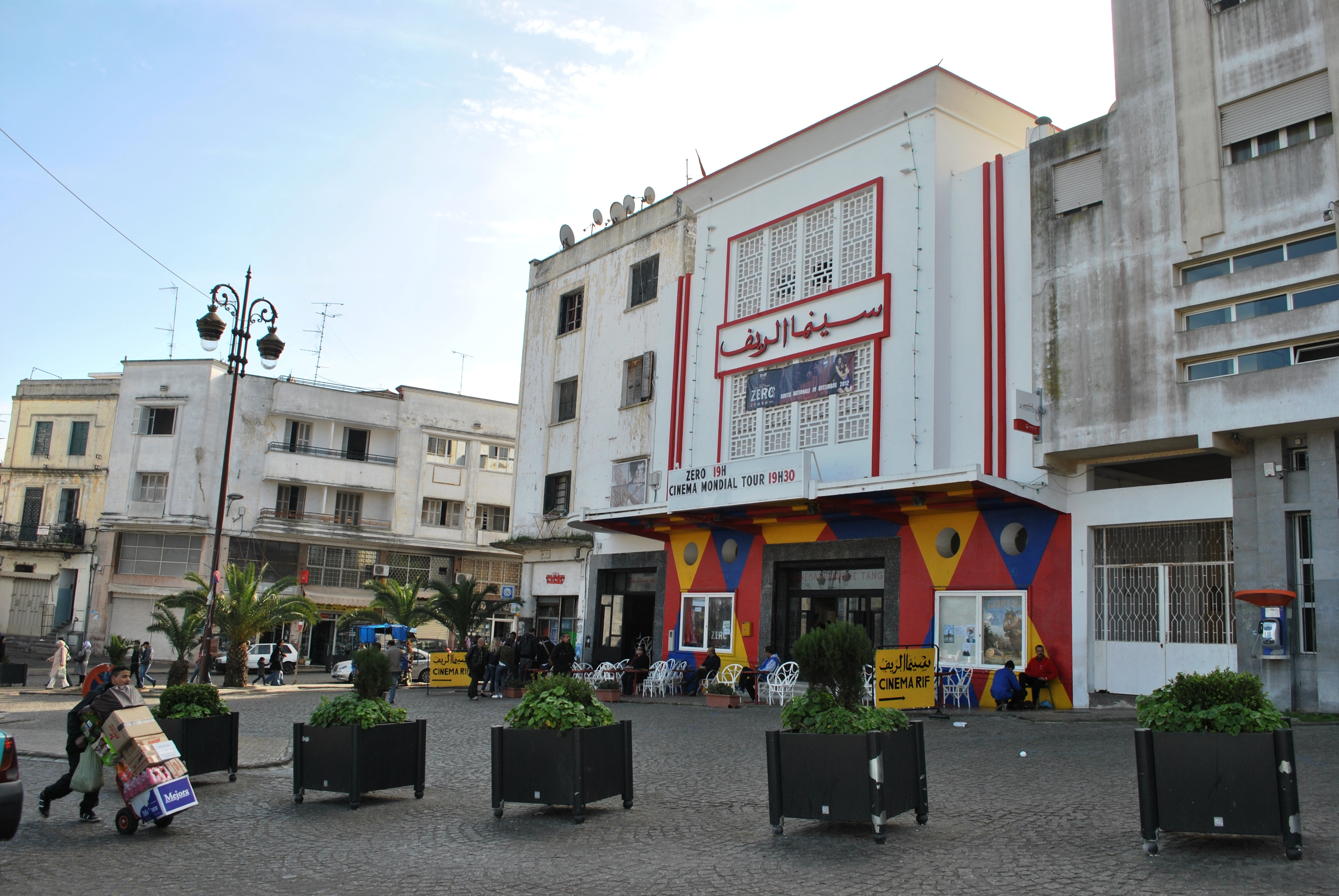
Cinémathèque de Tanger

Yto Barrada (born 1971) is a Franco-Moroccan multimedia visual artist living and working in Tangier, Morocco and New York City. Barrada cofounded the Cinémathèque de Tanger in 2006, leading a group of artists and filmmakers. Barrada also works as an artistic director for the Tangier art house movie theatre. She was previously a member of the Beirut-based Arab Image Foundation.

== Early life and education ==
Barrada was born in Paris, France in 1971 and raised in Tangier, Morocco. Her father Hamid Barrada, a former political opponent of Hassan II and leader of the student left, is a journalist and her mother, Mounira Bouzid El Alami, activist and psychotherapist. After living in Tangier for much of her life, Barrada returned to Paris to study at The University of Paris, also known as the Sorbonne, where she studied History and Political Science. Shortly after graduating, Barrada studied at the International Center of Photography in New York, New York.

== Work ==
Barrada befriended Bettina Grossman, a reclusive artist who was a longtime resident at Hotel Chelsea. Barrada and Grossman collaborated on an exhibition called The Power of Two Suns, which was on view at the Lower Manhattan Cultural Council's Arts Center at Governors Island in 2019. Barrada is working on a catalogue raisonné of Grossman's work.

Barrada's first photographic series, A Life Full of Holes: The Strait Project, was a collaborative project that took place between 1999 and 2003. Barrada later used this title for her book (2005). The Strait of Gibraltar appears as a theme again in Barrada's series The Sleepers, from 2006, in which she depicts subjects lying down in public spaces.

Barrada has presented her work in several galleries, such as Galerie Polaris in Paris. In 2006 she cofounded Cinémathèque de Tanger, North Africa's first art house cinema and film archive.

Barrada is presenting France at the 2026 Venice Biennale.

== Photos, videos, and sculpture ==
=== A Life Full of Holes: The Strait Project ===
In 1998 Barrada began a work she titled A Life Full of Holes: The Strait Project, which described the static and transitory life of her hometown of Tangier. Her photographs depict a city where thousands of immigrants attempt to make the illegal and perilous journey across the Strait of Gibraltar. This collaborative project, which takes as its title the 1964 autobiography of Moroccan storyteller Driss Ben Hamed Charhadi as narrated to Paul Bowles, focuses on the asymmetries of neo-colonial relationships between North Africa and Europe as well as the disillusionment of citizens wishing to leave Morocco for a different life in the North.

=== Iris Tingitana Project ===
Her 2007 work, Iris Tingitana Project, showed the meeting of botanical and urban landscapes. This series focuses on the disappearance of Iris flowers, found in Tangier, that symbolize resistance because they grow in even the most difficult situations. This exhibition depicts Barrada's focus on the landscape and heritage of her home within her art.

=== Riffs ===
In April 2011, her solo exhibition Riffs opened at the Deutsche Guggenheim, Berlin (2011), and then travelled to Wiels, Brussels in September, and in Ikon Gallery, Birmingham the following June. This was Barrada's first large-scale exhibition in Germany, and it constituted works from her previous shows (A Life Full of Holes: The Strait Project (1998-2004) and Iris Tingitana (2007)) as well as new work. The title, Riffs, contains references to music and rhythm as well as the Rif mountains of Morocco. The exhibit contained three films, Beau Geste (2009), Playground (2010), and Hand-Me-Downs (2011), which all spoke to the ideas of riffs, resistance, strength, and memory.

=== Album: Cinématèque Tangier ===
The Walker Art Center in Minneapolis, Minnesota exhibited Album: Cinématèque Tangier, a project by Yto Barrada from 21 November 2013 to 18 May 2014. Here, Barrada once again showed the film Hand-Me-Downs (2011) and exhibited work depicting life in Tangier. This exhibit specifically touched on Morocco's artistic and cinematic history through commissioned vintage movie posters and Barrada's sculpture Palm Sign (2010). This exhibition was curated by Sheryl Mousley and Clara Kim.

=== Faux Guide ===
In 2016, Barrada presented the exhibition Faux Guide at The Power Plant in Toronto, Ontario, depicting issues and images of post-colonial Morocco. This was a solo exhibit for Barrada that dealt with ongoing fossil exploration and the natural history of Morocco along what is known as "Dinosaur Road," where the fossil industry is most prevalent. This exhibition pulled from several of Barrada's projects at the time including North African Toy Series (2015) and Untitled (Orthoceras Coca-Cola bottles) (2016). Faux Guide presented viewers with ideas about how the natural world and human world are intertwined.

=== Dye Garden ===
From 25 September – 22 December 2019, Barrada's exhibition Dye Garden was on display at the Neuberger Museum of Art in New York following Barrada's award of the 2019 Roy R. Neuberger Prize. This exhibition includes video, photos, sculpture, and hand-dyed textiles inspired by her background, family history, and the West's history of colonization. All of the artwork in Dye Garden relates to the geology and botany of North Africa, a topic Barrada continues to return to, process, and relate to. This exhibit was originally presented at the American Academy in Rome during Barrada's residency there, and 2019 is the first time it has been shown in the United States.

== Selected exhibitions ==
- Yto Barrada: "My Very Educated Mother Just Served Us Nougat", organized by Mathaf: Arab Museum of Modern Art, August to December 2020 (solo exhibition)
- Yto Barrada: Dye Garden - Neuberger Museum of Art, Purchase, New York - 25 September through 22 December 2019 (solo exhibition)
- How to Do Nothing with Nobody All Alone by Yourself - The Pace Gallery, New York – 2018 (solo exhibition)
- Agadir - Barbican Centre 7 Feb 2018 – 20 May 2018 (solo exhibition)
- Tree Identification for Beginners performed with Performa 17 as a film and performance multi-media show - New York - 2017 (solo exhibition)
- Faux Guide - Pace Gallery London - 2015 (solo exhibition)
- Before Our Eyes: Other Cartographies of the Rif - MACBA, Barcelona - 2014 (group exhibition)
- Album: Cinématèque Tangier, a project by Yto Barrada - Walker Art Center - 2013-2014 (solo exhibition)
- La courte échelle (ou l'échelle des voleurs) – Studio Fotokino, Marseille, 2013 (solo exhibition)
- Mobilier Urbain – The Pace Gallery, London – 2012 (solo exhibition)
- Project Space: I decided not to save the world Tate, London - 2011-12 (group exhibition)
- Riffs – Deutsche Guggenheim, Berlin – 2011 (solo exhibition)
- Play – The Met, New York, NY – 2010 (solo exhibition)
- Uneven Geographies – Nottingham Contemporary – 2010 (group exhibition)
- DisOrientation II: The Rise and Fall of Arab Cities - Manarat Al Saadiyat, Abu Dhabi, United Arab Emirates - 22 Nov. 2009 – 20 Feb. 2010 (group exhibition)
- Iris Tingintana Project - Galerie Polaris, Paris, France - 29 September through 30 October 2007 (solo exhibition)
- Africa Remix - Museum Kunst Palast, Düsseldorf, Germany (and various other locations through 2006) - 24 July - 7 November 2004 (group exhibition)
- A Life Full of Holes/The Strait Project - Galerie Delacroix, Tangier, Morocco (and various other locations through 2006) - 7 April through 27 May 2001 (solo exhibitions)
- Quiet as It's Kept - 2022 Whitney Biennial - 2022

== Books and catalogues ==
Yto Barrada. Moi je suis la langue et vous êtes les dents is a catalogue published by Calouste Gulbenkian in 2019 and written by curator Rita Fabiana.

In 2017, Koenig Books published the limited edition A Guide to Trees for Governors and Gardeners and A Guide to Fossils for Forgers and Foreigners with the Deutsche Guggenheim.

A monograph, entitled Yto Barrada, was published by JRP Ringier in 2013, with texts from Marie Muracciole, Juan Goytisolo, and a photographic essay by Jean-François Chevrier.

Barrada published Riffs in 2011 with publisher Hatje Cantz as a catalogue for her work.

Barrada's book, A Life Full of Holes: The Strait Project, takes its title from a story by Larbi Layachi. It was published by Autograph ABP in 2005.

== Awards ==
- 2006 – Ellen Auerbach Award
- 2011 – Artist of the Year, presented by Deutsche Bank
- 2013 – Robert Gardner Fellowship in Photography, presented by the Peabody Museum of Archaeology and Ethnology
- 2015 – Abraaj Group Art Prize, presented by the Abraaj Group
- 2016 – Tiger Award for Short Films (for Faux Départ, describing the fossil industry in Morocco)
- 2019 – Roy R. Neuberger Prize, presented by the Neuberger Museum of Art in Purchase, New York
- 2023 – Soros Arts Fellowship, presented by the Open Society Foundations

== See also ==
- A Life Full of Holes, 1964 autobiographical novel by Moroccan author Driss Ben Hamed Charhadi
