= The Damned Don't Cry (2022 film) =

2022 film by Fyzal Boulifa

- Les Damnés ne pleurent pas
- Directed by: Fyzal Boulifa
- Screenplay by: Fyzal Boulifa
- Produced by: Karim Debbagh; Gary Farkas; Clément Lepoutre; Olivier Muller
- Cinematography: Caroline Champetier
- Edited by: François Quiqueré
- Music by: Nadah El Shazly
- Release date: 2022
- Running time: 111 minutes
- Language: Moroccan Arabic

The Damned Don't Cry (French: Les Damnés ne pleurent pas) is a 2022 French-Belgian-Moroccan drama film written and directed by Fyzal Boulifa. It premiered at the 79th edition of the Venice Film Festival, in the Giornate degli Autori sidebar.

== Plot ==
Selim, a teenage boy, and his mother Fatima-Zahra live together in a cramped, rented room. Fatima-Zahra, in need of money, leaves for what she tells Selim is a job interview, but it's actually a meeting for sex work that turns violent. After this incident, they relocate. Fatima-Zahra returns to her native village to seek shelter with her father, but her sister's resentment leads to a confrontation where Selim learns the truth about his parentage. This revelation forces them to leave for Tangier, where Selim also becomes involved in sex work and serves as a houseboy for a wealthy Frenchman. Meanwhile, Fatima-Zahra finds solace in a relationship with a married bus driver who originally brought them to Tangier.

== Cast ==
- Aicha Tebbae as Fatima-Zahra
- Abdellah El Hajjouji as Selim
- Antoine Reinartz as Sébastien
- Moustapha Mokafih as Moustapha

== Production ==
The concept for the film originated from Boulifa's observations of a mother and son in his extended family in Morocco. The mother had estranged her relatives by having a child outside of marriage, leading her son to take on adult responsibilities from a young age. “I wasn’t interested in diagnosing the social ill,” he said to The Observer, “but there was something poetic and very touching about the way the relationship was twisted: it was so full of love that would sometimes express itself in the most violent ways. That kind of push and pull really interested me.”

Boulifa borrowed the title "The Damned Don't Cry" for his film from a 1950 crime drama starring his screen idol Joan Crawford, where she portrays a mother who abandons her previous life after the death of her son.

The film was principally shot in Tangier, Morocco.

== Release ==
The film premiered at the 2022 Venice Film Festival, as part of the sidebar Giornate degli Autori. It premiered in UK cinemas on 7 July 2023, followed by its release in Moroccan cinemas in February 2024.

=== Box office ===
The Damned Don't Cry grossed $14,628 in the United Kingdom, where it reached its peak presence in 23 theaters and ran for 29 weeks.

== Reception ==
On the review aggregator website Rotten Tomatoes, 95% of 19 critics' reviews are positive, with an average rating of 7.80/10.

Peter Bradshaw, in his review for The Guardian, awarded the film 4 out of 5 stars, highlighting its powerful performances and lauding it as "another excellent film from Boulifa who shows style and real storytelling verve." He praised the film as an intimate and poignant study of a mother-son relationship in Morocco and highlighted how the film effectively portrays a dual portrait of the duo, capturing their individual struggles and conflicts. Wendy Ide also gave the film 4 out of 5 stars, hailing it as "impressive on every level". She applauded the "full-blooded and lived in" performances and highlighted the film's score, describing it as effectively evoking the disharmony between mother and son, with a discordant duel between cello and harp.

In his review for Variety, Guy Lodge praises The Damned Don't Cry as an exquisite film that remixes narrative components of classic noirs into a modern melodrama. He notes the film's fusion of Hollywood melodrama, Arabic soap opera emotionalism, and European arthouse realism, creating a unique and queer narrative of social isolation and survival. He commends Boulifa's mise-en-scène, highlighting the film's tight, precisely composed tableaux that reveal much about the characters and their environment. Lodge also praises the performances of the non-professional cast, particularly Aïcha Tebbae as Fatima-Zahra, for their compassionate portrayal of characters facing societal pressures and personal struggles.

Moroccan film critic Abdelkarim Ouakrim praised the director for mastering the actors' performances. He especially highlighted Tebbae's eminent professionalism, stating "I have never seen, in Moroccan cinema, an actress who portrays the role of a prostitute with such humane goodness."

Jessica Kiang, writing for the British Film Institute, lauds Aïcha Tebbae and Abdellah El Hajjouji's performances, especially Tebbae's portrayal of Fatima-Zahra. She also commends the film's direction, cinematography, and score. Kiang highlights Boulifa's skill in portraying humanity, including complex characters like Sébastian, noting that the script avoids stereotyping, and that despite the plot's potential for soap opera-like twists, Boulifa's script maintains a focus on the characters' humanity.

In Time Out's review by Phil de Semlyen, Boulifa's talent in drawing naturalistic performances from first-time actors and creating a film that stands on its own merits, avoiding simplistic comparisons to other filmmakers, is commended. The review notes the film's use of unusual textures, such as melodramatic strings and influences from North African soap operas. De Semlyen concludes his review by praising the film for its compelling portrayal of life's unfairness and the lack of easy answers, thanks to the compassionate direction and impressive performances.

Writing for Screen Daily, Adam Solomons lauds the film as a challenging melodrama that unearths fresh perspectives, both within its cast and its story. He praises the film's use of non-actors and for their naturalistic performances that nod to the neorealist tradition. The review also highlights the craftsmanship of cinematographer Caroline Champetier and composer Nadah El Shazly, whose work he states adds depth and style to the storytelling.

In his review for Financial Times, Danny Leigh awarded the film 5 out of 5 stars and lauded the performances of Tebbae and El Hajjouji, stating that "Boulifa makes a movie star of Fatima-Zahra" and that "Boulifa has cast two stars who have never acted on screen before. Watching their powerful work here, that seems almost unbelievable". He commends the director's ability to infuse vintage Hollywood melodrama into the film, comparing it to the works of Ken Loach, Alan Clarke, and the classic film Mildred Pierce,, and noting the film's exploration of fate, personal dynamics, and underlying themes of class, colonialism, and male self-delusion.

French film critic Jean-Baptiste Morain praised Boulifa's non-judgmental portrayal of characters, noting that he avoids caricatures and presents them in various lights, both literally and metaphorically.
