= Midnight in Mississippi =

Studio album by Blue Mountain
- Released: 2008

Midnight in Mississippi is a 2008 album by American alternative country group Blue Mountain.

== Track listing ==
1. "Groove Me
2. "By Your Side
3. "70's Song
4. "She's a Wild One
5. "Midnight in Mississippi
6. "Emily Smiles
7. "Butterfly
8. "Pretty Please
9. "Gentle Soul
10. "Rainy Day
11. "Free State of Jones
12. "Skinny Dipping
