= Blue Mountain (Blue Mountain album) =

Studio album by Blue Mountain
- Released: 1993
- Recorded: June 1993
- Genre: Alternative country, country rock, roots rock, Southern rock
- Length: 41:35
- Label: 4 Barrell
- Producer: Blue Mountain

Blue Mountain chronology
Blue Mountain (1993)	Dog Days (1995)

Professional ratings
Review scores
Source	Rating
AllMusic	3/5 stars

Blue Mountain is the debut album by American alternative country and Southern rock group Blue Mountain. It was recorded in June 1993 and released on 4 Barrell Records, produced by the band. Writing for AllMusic, Rob Caldwell said that it was less consistent than Blue Mountain's later work, but that it was essential for fans of the band.

== Track listing ==
1. "Bud" (Cary Hudson) — 3:48
2. "Let's Ride" (Hudson) — 3:44
3. "Song Without a Name" (Hudson) — 3:35
4. "Westbound" (Hudson) — 3:05
5. "Mountain Girl" (Hudson) — 4:03
6. "900 Miles" (Traditional) — 3:15
7. "Soul Sister" (Hudson) — 4:58
8. "In a Station" (Hudson, Pearman, Stirratt) — 4:07
9. "Jimmy Carter" (Hudson) — 2:28
10. "Go 'Way Devil" (Traditional) — 5:08
11. "Wink" (Hudson) — 3:24

== Personnel ==
Music

- Matt Brennan — drums
- Cary Hudson — acoustic guitar, banjo, electric guitar, harmonica, mandolin, vocals
- Laurie Stirratt — bass, vocals

Production

- Blue Mountain — production
- Jim Hawkins — mastering

Design

- Newt Rayburn — photography and graphic design
