= Lynn + Lucy =

2020 film directed by Fyzal Boulifa

- Film poster
- Directed by: Fyzal Boulifa
- Starring: Roxanne Scrimshaw; Nichola Burley; Shaq B. Grant; Samson Cox-Vinell; Tia Nelson; Jennifer Lee Moon; Kacey Ainsworth; Jack Shalloo; Molly Phipps
- Production companies: BBC Films; British Film Institute; Lipsync Productions; Charades Film Company; Rosetta Productions; Sixteen Films; Vixens Films
- Release date: 2019
- Country: United Kingdom
- Language: English

Lynn + Lucy is a 2019 British drama film, directed by Fyzal Boulifa. It stars Roxanne Scrimshaw as Lynn and Nichola Burley as Lucy, two childhood friends who fall out after domestic tension in Lucy's household. The film premiered at the 2019 San Sebastian Film Festival.

The film was released on July 2, 2020 in the UK to widespread critical acclaim.

== Synopsis ==
Lynn and Lucy are childhood friends who, ten years after meeting, live opposite each other and still share the same friendship they did as teenagers. While Lynn had her daughter Lola at age 16 and married her childhood sweetheart Paul, Lucy has remained carefree, impulsive and a self-proclaimed party girl. The film opens with the christening of Lucy's son Harrison, to whom Lynn is godmother. Lucy accompanies Lynn to her first day at her new job, the hair salon of a friend from school. Lynn is embarrassed that a school friend of hers has done well in life while she feels she is unaccomplished apart from being a mother. The salon owner Janelle criticizes Lynn's friendship with Lucy, claiming Lucy would bully and belittle her when they were younger, leaving Lynn feeling awkward. As they get ready for their first night out since Lucy's pregnancy, the women share their respective qualms about their lives: Lynn claims to be content with her life despite her husband being discharged from his job due to a leg injury and his desire for an open relationship. Lucy is much more vocal about her struggles with her boyfriend Clark and her inability to bond with her son.

The two visit a local bar and bump into Tim, whom they recognize from school. Despite his clear interest in Lynn, Lynn shies away from the attention while Lucy flirts and eventually kisses him, much to Lynn's annoyance. Lucy leaves the club in a drunken state and laments that she is bored and frustrated with her mundane life.

The following day, Lynn is shocked to see Lucy leaving in an ambulance with a critically ill Harrison. She later learns that Harrison has died and Lucy has disappeared, leaving Lynn feeling lost and alone. As well as this, Lynn is belittled and covertly ridiculed at her new job. Lynn eventually bumps into Lucy at a local shop looking dishevelled and brings Lucy back to her home. After a great deal of pressing, Lucy reveals that her boyfriend Clark has been arrested as he is suspected of having shaken baby Harrison, resulting in his death. News of this begins to spread around the town and many people begin suspecting Lucy of the tragedy as she begins to spiral into her previous wild lifestyle.

Lynn is invited out with her colleagues for Janelle's birthday at a local bar, where they all witness a drunken Lucy flirt with a much older man and get into a verbal altercation with a patron who labels her a child killer. Lynn watches Lucy sadly as she is forced to leave while the other women badmouth her childhood friend. As Lynn begins to feel more accepted by her work colleagues, particularly the kindly older Caroline, she starts to drift from Lucy. Caroline reveals to Lynn that she lost a son when she was much younger; this prompts Lynn to reveal that she does not trust Lucy and believes she may be the one responsible for Harrison's death based upon Lucy's drunken tirades around town and her eagerness to visit Clark in prison. Following this, Lynn is told by her daughter Lola that she had witnessed Lucy shake baby Harrison in the past when he had cried, leading Lynn and Paul to have Lola make a police statement and ask Lucy to leave their home. This behavior subsequently ends the girls' friendship, with Lucy moving back into her old vandalized home and Lynn reinventing herself with a makeover courtesy of her colleagues and speaking publicly at a local council meeting about supporting young mothers.

With their friendship ended, Lucy's behavior spirals out of control. On one occasion, she turns up to the salon in which Lynn and her colleague-turned-friends are, demanding a haircut. Janelle forces Lynn to cut her hair and, with encouragement from the other girls, Lynn haphazardly chops off Lucy's long blue hair and leaves her scalped. Lucy walks out of the salon and Lynn is left feeling vindicated.

Shortly after this incident, Lynn is on her way to work when she witnesses a woman tapping on the window of Lucy's car in her driveway. Upon approaching the car, Lynn sees that Lucy has hooked the car up to pipes and has committed suicide. Lynn is traumatized by the death of her closest friend, however her colleagues at the salon turn against her, leaving her even lonelier. Her torment is made even worse when Lola reveals she actually lied about seeing Lucy shake Harrison.

Lynn watches Clark, freshly released from prison, come to the house and collect his belongings. With Harrison and Lucy both dead, Lynn is still left questioning who, if anyone, was responsible, and is forced to return to the mundanity of her life.

== Cast ==
- Roxanne Scrimshaw - Lynn
- Nichola Burley - Lucy
- Shaq B. Grant - Paul
- Samson Cox-Vinell - Clark
- Tia Nelson - Lola
- Jennifer Lee Moon - Janelle
- Kacey Ainsworth - Caroline
- Jack Shalloo - Tim
- Molly Phipps - New salon employee

== Production ==
The film was filmed and set in Harlow, Essex.

== Reception ==
The film received largely positive reviews on its release. On the review aggregator website Rotten Tomatoes, the film has an approval rating of 93% based on 14 reviews.

Mark Kermode awarded the film five stars out of five and wrote that it is a "blend of social realism and psychological drama, conjuring a universal tale from a very specific situation". Kermode called Scrimshaw "a revelation" and "the film’s extraordinary wild card", adding that Burley "hits a career high".

Peter Bradshaw, on his four-star review for The Guardian, called it "[a] fiercely impressive feature debut" and underlined the two leads' "great" performances. Guy Lodge from Variety highlighted the "superbly matched pair of lead performances" and called the film an "unforgiving study of working-class tragedy and community". Beth Webb from Empire awarded the film four out of five stars and opined that the film is "[a] larger study of mob culture in our country that will linger" and remarked on the "impressive performances".

== Accolades ==
- British Independent Film Awards
  - Most Promising Newcomer - Roxanne Scrimshaw
  - Best Debut Director
- London Film Critics Circle
  - Breakthrough British/Irish Filmmaker of the Year
- San Sebastián International Film Festival
  - New Directors Award
- Vilnius International Film Festival
  - Best Director (winner)
  - Best Actress - Roxanne Scrimshaw and Nichola Burley (winner)
- Zurich Film Festival
  - Best International Feature Film
