= Home Grown (Blue Mountain album) =

Studio album by Blue Mountain
- Released: July 15, 1997
- Recorded: October–December, 1996
- Genre: Alternative country, country rock, Southern rock
- Length: 46:58
- Label: Roadrunner
- Producer: Blue Mountain

Blue Mountain chronology
Dog Days (1995)	Home Grown (1997)	Tales of a Traveler (1999)

Home Grown is the third studio album by American alternative country group Blue Mountain, released in 1997.

== Critical reception ==
Professional ratings
Review scores
Source	Rating
AllMusic	4/5 stars
NME	6/10
Rolling Stone	3/5 stars

The Washington Post praised "Hudson's affection for the odd characters who inhabit, or sometimes just float through, small Southern towns."

AllMusic wrote: "Homegrown is informed by melodic smarts absent from so many contemporary alt-country records; [Cary] Hudson's parched, Dylan-esque vocals remain wonderfully evocative as well, helping establish an authentic sense of time and place."

== Track listing ==
1. "Bloody 98"
2. "Myrna Lee"
3. "Pretty Please"
4. "Black Dog"
5. "Generic America"
6. "Last Words of Midnight Clyde"
7. "Babe"
8. "It Ain't Easy to Love a Liar"
9. "Ira Magee"
10. "Town Clown"
11. "Dead End Street"
12. "Rain"
