= Blue Mountains =

Blue Mountains may refer to:

== Geography ==
- Blue Mountains (New South Wales), Australia
  - City of Blue Mountains, a local government area west of Sydney
  - Blue Mountains Conservation Society, NGO advocating for the protection of the Blue Mountains in NSW
  - Blue Mountains Line, a railway line
  - Blue Mountains National Park
  - Blue Mountains walking tracks
  - Electoral district of Blue Mountains
  - Greater Blue Mountains Area, a World Heritage Site
- Blue Mountains (Nunavut), Canada
- The Blue Mountains, Ontario, a town in Canada
- Blue Mountains (Congo), northwest of Lake Albert, Democratic Republic of the Congo
- Sinimäed Hills (Blue Mountains) in Estonia, near Narva
- Nilgiri mountains (Blue Mountains), southern India
- Blue Mountains (Jamaica)
- Blue Mountains (New Zealand), in West Otago
- Blue Mountains (Niger), a mountain range near the Aïr Mountains in Niger
- Blue Mountains (Pacific Northwest), United States
  - Blue Mountains (ecoregion), a Level III ecoregion
- Blue Mountains or Abajo Mountains, Utah, United States

== Literature ==
- The Blue Mountains (fairy tale), a fairy tale by Andrew Lang in The Yellow Fairy Book
- Blue Mountains (Middle-earth) or Ered Luin, fictional mountains in Tolkien's Middle-earth

== Film and television ==
- Blue Mountains (1983 film), Georgian film of Eldar Shengelaia
- Blue Mountains (2015 film), Hindi film of Raujesh Kumar Jain
- "Blue Mountains" (Bluey), an episode of the first season of the animated TV series Bluey

== Music ==
- "The Blue Mountains" (song), a song about Australia by Sir Edward Elgar to a poem by Alfred Noyes

== See also ==
- List of Blue Mountains subjects, articles about the Blue Mountains in Australia
- Blue Mountain (disambiguation)
- Blue Ridge Mountains
- Blue Ridge (disambiguation)
