= Bettina Grossman =

American conceptual artist (1927–2021)

Bettina Grossman (September 28, 1927 – November 2, 2021) was an American conceptual artist, best known for her longtime residency at the Hotel Chelsea in Manhattan and her eccentric persona.

== Biography ==
Grossman was born in Brooklyn, to Saul and Pauline Grossman on 28 September 1927. She had three siblings. The family lived in Borough Park and observed Orthodox Judaism.

Grossman studied commercial art in high school and worked as a textile designer, making enough money to move to Europe and pursue art during the 1950s and 1960s. After struggling to make ends meet overseas, she moved back to New York City and settled into Manhattan's historic Hotel Chelsea, a haven for artists, musicians, and cultural icons. She lived in room 503, which doubled as her living quarters and art studio. Her apartment became overloaded with years of accumulated art and materials, so she resorted to sleeping in a lawn chair in the hallway.

Despite her decades long career, Grossman began to experience notoriety for her work during her later years. She was the subject of a 2010 documentary film, Girl With Black Balloons.

During Bettina's later years, there was a renewed interest in her work and well-being. This period saw contributions from various individuals, including Rachel Cohen, also a longtime resident of the Chelsea Hotel, and Varun Khanna, a representative from the United Nations who became acquainted with Bettina through a chance meeting. Their involvement culminated in Bettina's collaborations with artist Yto Barrada and the Amazon Prime documentary Dreaming Walls, focused on the hotel's history. As a result, at 92, Bettina, emerging from years of isolation, participated as an inaugural artist at the Lower Manhattan Cultural Council on Governors Island and had her work exhibited at prestigious venues like the Museum of Modern Art before her death.

Grossman died from respiratory failure on 2 November 2021 at the age of 94 at a care centre in Brooklyn.

== Artwork ==
Grossman’s oeuvre consists of drawings, sculpture, and photographs. A studio fire in the late 1960s destroyed much of her work, and prompted a shift in aesthetic style and ideology. An example includes the photographic series Phenomenology Project (1979–80), featuring distorted views of New York City seen from window reflections. Yto Barrada, a Moroccan-French artist who exhibited with Grossman, is working on a catalogue raisonné of her work.

== Exhibitions ==
In 2019, Barrada and Grossman collaborated on a project that explored concepts of ecological devastation. The exhibition, titled The Power of Two Suns, was on view at the Lower Manhattan Cultural Council’s Arts Center at Governors Island. Prior to her death, Grossman was one of 47 contemporary artists featured in the 2021 iteration of Greater New York, MoMA PS.1’s annual survey of New York-based artists. At the age of 94, she was the oldest artist in the exhibition.

Grossman's work was shown at Manhattan's Ulrik Gallery in 2024.
