= Michael Dreher (director) =

German film director and screenwriter

- Born: 1974 (age 51–52); Ruit, Germany
- Occupations: Film director and Screenplay writer
- Years active: 1996–present

Michael Dreher (born 1974 in Ruit) is a German film director and screenwriter.

== Life and work ==
Michael Dreher was born in Ruit, Ostfildern, Baden-Württemberg.

In 1996, he started to work as production manager and thereafter, in 1997, he studied film direction at the University of Television and Film Munich. Michael Dreher finished his study in 2006 with a successful diploma- and short film Fair Trade, which he produced together with Karim Debbagh and which was nominated for the Student Academy Award.

== Filmography (selection) ==
- 2006: Fair Trade (Film director, Screenplay writer and Producer)
- 2009: Die zwei Leben des Daniel Shore (Film director and Screenplay writer)

== Awards and nominations ==
- Fair Trade (2006)
  - 2006: AFI Fest - Audience award for Best Short
  - 2006: German Short Film Award - Short Film Award in Gold
  - 2007: Shnit international shortfilmfestival - Jury Award for Best LONG JOHN
  - 2007: Aspen Shorts Fest - Jury Award for Best Drama
  - 2007: Student Academy Awards - nomination for Best Honorary Foreign Film
