= Blue Ridge (2010 film) =

- Directed by: Vince Sweeney
- Written by: Vince Sweeney
- Produced by: Barry Finlayson; Andrew Mullin
- Starring: Sean Gullette; Eric Sweeney; Audra Glyn Smith; Beverly Amsler
- Cinematography: John Paul Clark; Jayson Crothers
- Music by: Andrew Barkan
- Release date: February 27, 2010 (Cinequest Film Festival)
- Running time: 90 minutes
- Country: United States
- Language: English

Blue Ridge is a 2010 drama film set in the rural Blue Ridge Mountains of Virginia. Written and directed by Vince Sweeney. Starring Sean Gullette as the trailer park landlord, Mr. Johnston, Eric Sweeney (L.A. based actor) as J.T., and Audra Glyn Smith (N.C. based actress) as Sara, with a lot of other interesting small roles.

== Premise ==
Sara falls for J.T., an unstable young man who lives in a rural trailer park. Together they plan a new life at the beach, operating a used amusement-park ride. Mr. Johnston has other plans for J.T. He wants to keep him tied to the trailer park and under his control and hopes to convince J.T. to join his questionable lifestyle. As pressure builds for J.T. to face his fear of change and the outside world, Sara holds on to the hope that they can push forward together and live out their dream.

== Cast ==
- Sean Gullette as Mr. Johnston
- Eric Sweeney as J.T.
- Audra Glyn Smith as Sara
- Beverly Amsler as Female Cop
