= Blue Ridge High School =

Blue Ridge High School refers to high schools in the following US states:

- Blue Ridge High School (Arizona): Pinetop-Lakeside, Arizona
- Blue Ridge High School (Illinois): Farmer-City, Illinois
- Blue Ridge High School (Texas): Blue Ridge, Texas
- Blue Ridge High School (Pennsylvania): New Milford, Pennsylvania
- Blue Ridge High School (South Carolina): Greer, South Carolina

== See also ==
- Blue Ridge School, St. George, Virginia
- Blue Ridge School (North Carolina), Cashiers, North Carolina
- Blue Ridge School District, Pennsylvania
