= Mount Blue =

Mount Blue may refer to:

- Mount Blue (Maine) in Maine, USA
- Mount Blue (New Hampshire) in New Hampshire, USA

== See also ==
- Blue Mountain (disambiguation)
