= Cinémathèque de Tanger =

Art house movie theater in Tangier, Morocco

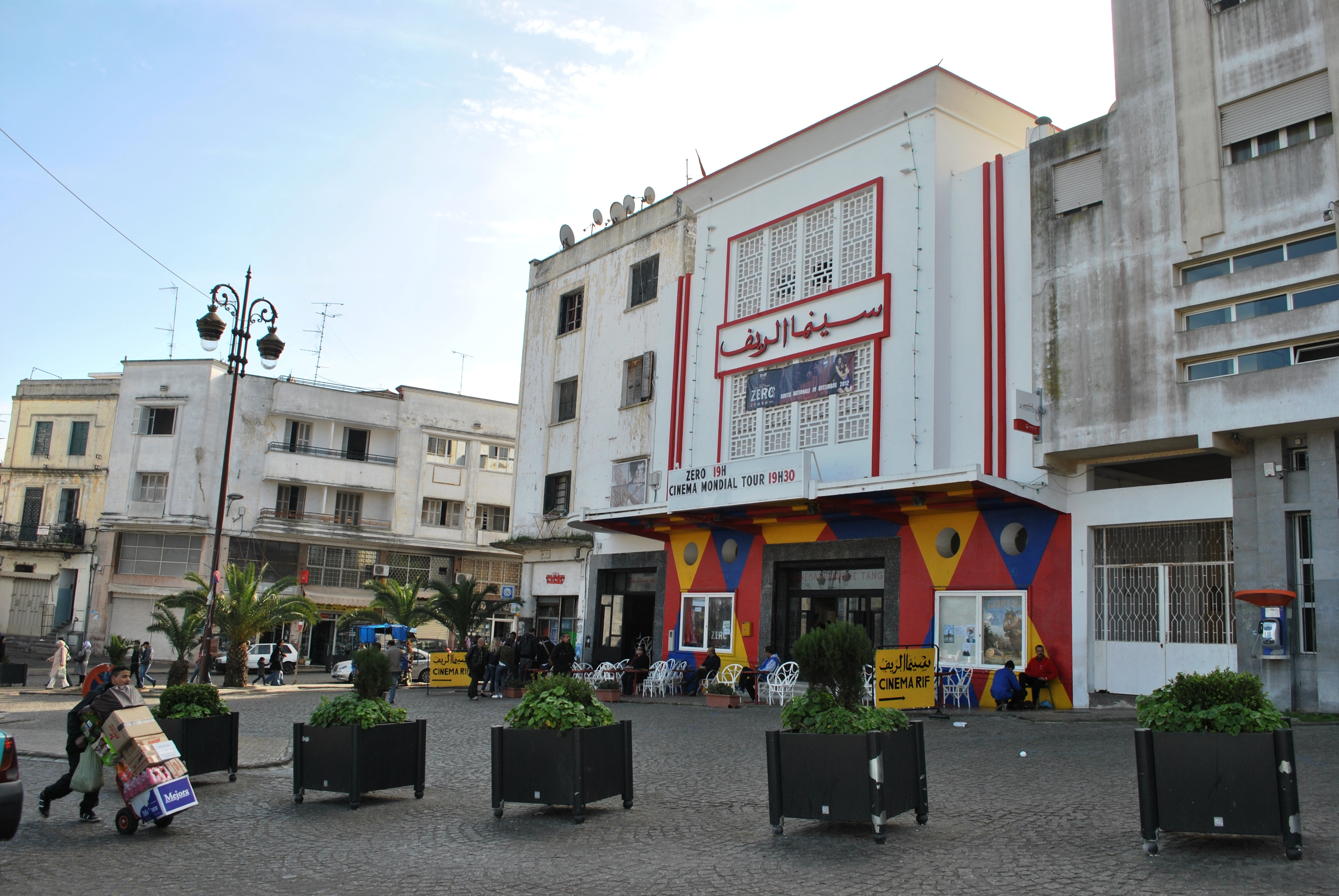
Cinémathèque de Tanger

Cinémathèque de Tanger (CDT) is an art house movie theater in Tangier, Morocco. CDT was founded by artist Yto Barrada in 2006, and is located within the restored Art Deco Cinéma Rif building in the Casbah district. The head of CDT's programming is artist Sido Lansari. In order to accommodate the new film institution, Cinéma Rif, which is located on the Grand Socco was renovated by the French architect Jean-Marc Lalo. CDT is North Africa's first art house cinema and film archive.

CDT offers screenings of contemporary and classic films from over 20 countries, as well as workshops, masterclasses, a café, and an archive. The nonprofit institution is also a founding partner of the Beirut-based Network of Arab Arthouse Screens (NAAS), and is an Associate of the Fédération Internationale des Archives du Film. The independent cinema is documented in the multidisciplinary exhibition Album: Cinémathèque Tanger, a project by Yto Barrada held at the Walker Art Center in from 2013 to 2014.
