= Blue Mountain (Missouri) =

Summit in the American state of Missouri

Coordinates: 37°32′44″N 90°29′38″W

Highest point
- Elevation: 1,381 feet

Geography
- Location: Madison County, Missouri
- Country: United States

Blue Mountain is a summit in Madison County in the U.S. state of Missouri. It has an elevation of 1,381 feet (421 m).

Blue Mountain derives its name from the local Belew family.
