= Fyzal Boulifa =

British-Moroccan filmmaker (born 1985)

- Born: 1985 (age 40–41); Leicester, United Kingdom
- Notable work: Lynn + Lucy; The Damned Don't Cry

Fyzal Boulifa (born 1985) is a British filmmaker. Born in Leicester to Moroccan immigrant parents, his early work includes the short films The Curse (2012) and Rate Me (2015), the former of which earned a BAFTA nomination. Boulifa made his feature film debut with Lynn + Lucy (2019). This was followed by The Damned Don't Cry (2022).

== Early life and education ==
Boulifa was born and raised in Leicester to Moroccan parents who worked as nursing assistants and later ran an ice cream van. Boulifa watched videos brought home by his brother and became interested in horror films, underground films and "weird" Asian cinema. Boulifa recalls skipping college once, during which he stumbled upon Carl Theodor Dreyer's Day of Wrath at Leicester's only arthouse cinema. He initially aspired to be a film critic, influenced by reading Robert Bresson's Notes on the Cinematographer.

At age 17, Boulifa dropped out of school and left home for London, where he briefly studied film at the London College of Communication. However, he found the experience unsatisfying, stating, "it didn’t seem serious. I just wasn’t very happy in institutions generally." This led him to pursue a DIY approach, making short films "on a trial and error basis," during a time when there was development funding targeted at filmmakers from regional and ethnic minority backgrounds. He stated only his last two short films were worth watching, acknowledging the element of recklessness in his early work, stating, "There was this element of, ‘this is the only thing that I can do. So it has to work."

== Career ==
Boulifa relocated to Paris in his late twenties, partly motivated by the historical colonial ties between France and Morocco, which facilitated obtaining financing for filming in Morocco. His film career began with The Curse, a 2012 short film shot in Morocco, which tells the story of a young Moroccan woman persecuted by children after being seen with a man outside a desert settlement. The film was nominated for a BAFTA. His 2015 short, Rate Me, offers a portrait of a teenage escort through 12 online user reviews. Both short films won the Illy Prize for Best Short Film at the Cannes Directors’ Fortnight section.

Boulifa made his feature film debut with Lynn + Lucy, which premiered in 2019 and had a wide release in 2020. The film is a social-realist narrative about two working-class women from Essex, which initially surprised audiences given Boulifa's background as a gay British Moroccan who grew up in Leicester and lived in Paris at the time. The film received critical acclaim, challenging perceptions of identity and environment. In 2023, he released his second feature, The Damned Don't Cry. Set in Morocco, the film follows a mother and son living in poverty, navigating lives of exploitation and shame.

== Filmography ==
=== Short films ===
- Afternoon (2007)
- Whore (2009)
- Burn my Body (2010)
- The Curse (2012)
- Rate Me (2015)

=== Feature films ===
- Lynn + Lucy (2019)
- The Damned Don't Cry (2022)

== Personal life ==
Boulifa is gay. As of July 2023, he lives in South London.
