= Blue Mountain (California) =

Mountain in the Sierra Nevada, California

- Location within California Location within the United States

Highest point
- Elevation: 8,772 ft (2,674 m) NGVD 29
- Prominence: 12 ft (3.7 m)
- Coordinates: 38°50′54″N 120°11′52″W

Geography
- Location: El Dorado County, California, U.S.
- Parent range: Crystal Range, Sierra Nevada
- Topo map: USGS Pyramid Peak

Climbing
- Easiest route: Hike, class 1-2

Blue Mountain is a mountain in the Crystal Range, a subrange of the Sierra Nevada. It is west of Lake Tahoe on the western boundary of the Desolation Wilderness in El Dorado County, California.

== See also ==
- Eldorado National Forest
