= Driss Ben Hamed Charhadi =

- Born: January 1, 1937
- Citizenship: Morocco
- Occupation: Writer

Driss ben Hamed Charhadi (1937–1986) is the pen name of Larbi Layachi, a Moroccan story-teller, some of whose stories have been translated by Paul Bowles from Moroccan Arabic to English. His book, A Life Full of Holes, was tape-recorded and translated by Bowles over the course of several visits to his home by Charhadi, and published in 1964 by Grove Press.

A second collection of stories, Yesterday and Today, was published by Black Sparrow Press in 1985. In 1986 he published a memoir, The Jealous Lover. Neither of these two books list translators, but in a note in the latter, Katherine Harer states that he dictated it to her in English; he was her student in grammar and writing classes at San Francisco Community College.

== Bibliography ==
- Layachi, Larbi (1966). A Life Full of Holes. New York, N. Y.: Grove Press. ISBN 0394179463.
- Layachi, Larbi (1985). Yesterday and Today. Santa Barbara: Black Sparrow Press. ISBN 0876856326.
- Layachi, Larbi (1986). The Jealous Lover. Bolinas: Timbouctou Books. ISBN 0939180308.
