= Blue Mountain, Kings County, Nova Scotia =

Community in Nova Scotia, Canada

Coordinates: 44°53′4″N 64°31′59″W

Blue Mountain in Nova Scotia

Blue Mountain is a community in the Canadian province of Nova Scotia, located in Kings County.
