= Margaret Morganroth Gullette =

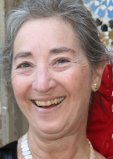
Margaret Morganroth Gullette

Margaret Morganroth Gullette (born 1941) is a resident scholar at the Women's Studies Research Center at Brandeis University. She is a writer of nonfiction, an essayist, and activist. Her contributions to the field of cultural studies of age include four books, the latest of which is Agewise: Fighting the New Ageism in America (2011).

== Early life and education ==
Margaret Morganroth was born in Brooklyn, NY, the first child of Betty Morganroth and Martin Morganroth. She was educated through high school at public schools and received scholarships to go to college and graduate school. Morganroth Gullette holds a B.A. magna cum laude Phi Beta Kappa from Radcliffe College, a M.A. from University of California, Berkeley, and a Ph.D. from Harvard University.

== Career ==
Before becoming a scholar in the Women's Studies Research Center in 1996, she had previously worked at the Harvard-Danforth Center for Teaching and Learning and had been a visiting scholar at Harvard; the Schlesinger Library, Radcliffe; Northeastern University; Wellesley Center for Research on Women. At the Danforth (now Bok) Center, she edited The Art and Craft of Teaching. She continues to publish in the field of pedagogy and education.

Working in the Schlesinger Library at Radcliffe, Gullette found a lost novel by the late nineteenth-century English feminist, Mona Caird, The Daughters of Danaus, and wrote an introduction for the Feminist Press reissue. Early in the feminist second wave, she published a feminist children's book called The Lost Bellybutton (1976).

She was invited to be the George A. Miller Visiting Professor, at the Center for Advanced Studies, University of Illinois (Urbana/ Champaign), in the spring of 2000. She is an advisory editor to the new journal, Age, Culture, Humanities: An Interdisciplinary Journal, and on the book series, Aging Studies in Europe (LIT Verlag). She is on the advisory committee of the European Network on Aging. She was on the advisory committee of the Journal of Aging, the Humanities, and the Arts, 2006 2010 and co editor, Age Studies Series, University Press of Virginia, 1993 1999.

== Major ideas ==
She is a critic of biological essentialism, defender of social constructionism, and opponent of 'middle ageism'" (Hepworth 1999, Abstract), and the author of an "increasingly influential range of publications on the social construction of ageing" (Hepworth 1999, 139) and the life course in the United States. She argues in several books (1997, 2004, 2011) that collective sociopolitical changes are necessary. Staging Age, edited by Valerie Barnes Lipscomb and Leni Marshall, gives credit to Gullette's work in establishing the field of age studies, and advancing concepts about how age can be considered a performance (Lipscomb and Marshall 2010, 1–3).

She invented the term "middle ageism" (Gullette 1998, 3–44) to name the cluster of discriminations suffered by people in their middle years, from job discrimination to "Boomer-bashing" and decline discourse about sexuality, looks, and intellectual and cognitive competence. Other concepts developed by Gullette—such as "age ideology," "being aged by culture," and the use of "progress narrative" as a way out of the binary between "positive aging" and "decline narrative"—have been adopted by scholars in a range of disciplines.

Gullette has also published as a freelance writer in a number of magazines, newspapers and blogs.

== Honors and awards ==
Aged by Culture (2004), was chosen as a Noteworthy Book of the year by the Christian Science Monitor. It was also nominated for a Pulitzer.

== Personal life ==
She married David Gullette, a college classmate, in 1964. They have one child, Sean Gullette (born 1968), an actor, screenwriter, and film-director.

== Books ==
- Agewise: Fighting the New Ageism in America (University of Chicago Press, 2011).
- Aged by Culture (University of Chicago Press, 2004).
- Declining to Decline: Cultural Combat and the Politics of the Midlife (U of Virginia Press, 1997). Out of print.
- Safe at Last in the Middle Years: The Invention of the Midlife Progress Novel (U of California Press, 1988; Iuniverse).
- Mona Caird, The Daughters of Danaus, with an Afterword by Margaret Morganroth Gullette (Feminist Press, 1989).
