= Blue Ridge Railway =

Blue Ridge Railway may refer to:

- Blue Ridge Railroad (1849–1870) in Virginia, predecessor of the Chesapeake and Ohio Railway
- Blue Ridge Railway (1901) in South Carolina, predecessor of the Southern Railway until about 1990
  - Blue Ridge Railroad of South Carolina, 1852–1880, predecessor of the above
- Blue Ridge Scenic Railway, tourist line in Georgia
- Virginia Blue Ridge Railway, 1914–1980, short line in Virginia
  - Blue Ridge Railway Trail, built along the above
