= USS Blue Ridge =

USS Blue Ridge may refer to the following ships of the United States Navy:

- USS Blue Ridge (ID-2432), was originally constructed as the Great Lakes passenger steamer Virginia and was in service for less than a year during 1918
- USS Blue Ridge (AGC-2), was an amphibious force flagship, and served from 1943 to 1947
- USS Blue Ridge (LCC-19), is a command and control ship, serving as the Seventh Fleet command ship
