= Blue Mountain (band) =

American alt-country/roots rock band

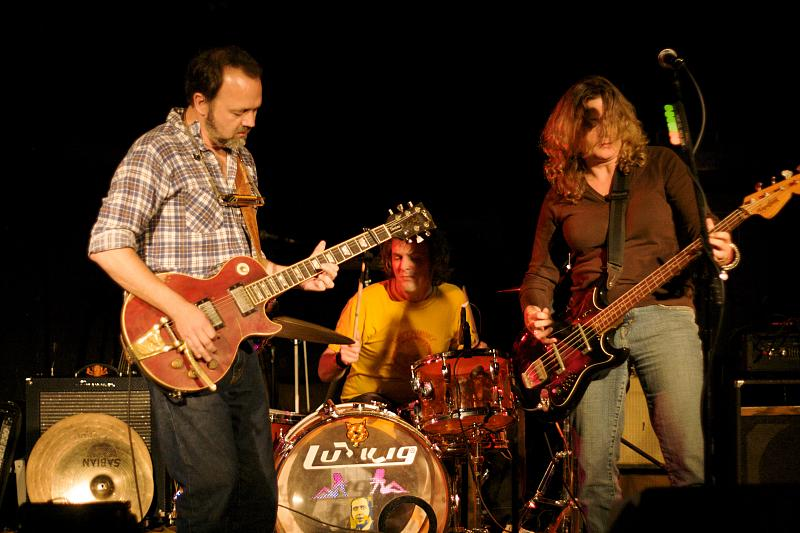
- Blue Mountain playing at The Bottleneck in Lawrence, Kansas, April 18, 2008.

Background information
- Origin: Mississippi, United States
- Genres: Americana; alt-country; roots rock; country rock
- Years active: 1993–2001, 2007–2013
- Labels: Broadmoor Records, 4-Barrel Records, Roadrunner Records, Black Dog Records, Blue Mountain Records, Glitterhouse Records
- Members: Jed Newell; Laurie Stirratt; Cary Hudson
- Past members: Charles David Overton; Matt Brennan; Ted Gainey; George Sheldon; Frank Croutch

Blue Mountain is an American alt-country/roots rock band formed in 1991 in Oxford, Mississippi, by Cary Hudson (guitar and vocals) and Laurie Stirratt (bass and harmony vocals), who is the twin sister of John Stirratt, the bass player for the like-minded Americana band Wilco.

== History ==
After the dissolution of their former band, The Hilltops, Hudson and Stirratt moved back to Oxford and, joined by drummer Matt Brennan, began performing and recording roots rock. With this line-up, the band released their first self-titled album on their own 4-Barrel Records in 1993. The band was signed by the independent Roadrunner Records label and released their second album, Dog Days, with new drummer Frank Coutch in 1995. The album comprised many songs from their first eponymous release and garnered the band a fair amount of critical and commercial success in alt-country circles, featuring the band's best-known song, "Blue Canoe." Two more albums followed on Roadrunner Records, Home Grown in 1997, and Tales of a Traveler in 1999. An album of all public-domain roots music covers, simply titled Roots followed in 2001, before their final farewell live release, Tonight It's Now or Never in 2002.

Blue Mountain reunited in the summer of 2007. They played the South by Southwest Music Festival in Austin, Texas, in mid-March 2008, and as one of the main acts at the 2008 Double Decker Arts Festival on April 26, 2008, in Oxford, Mississippi. On August 19, 2008, they released Midnight in Mississippi, an album of original material, spanning 12 tracks including 3 songs from solo albums released by Hudson, as well as an album of re-recorded Blue Mountain originals entitled Omnibus, which strips away the distortion of the original releases and allows for a crisper, cleaner take on the 14 songs. The albums are released on Broadmoor Records.

In 2013 Hudson and Stiratt dissolved the band following their last appearance at the North Mississippi Hill Country Picnic on June 29, 2013.

== Discography ==
- Blue Mountain (1993)
- Dog Days (1995)
- Home Grown (1997)
- Tales of a Traveler (1999)
- Roots (2001)
- Tonight It's Now or Never (2002)
- Omnibus (2008)
- Midnight in Mississippi (2008)
