= Cary Hudson =

American singer-songwriter

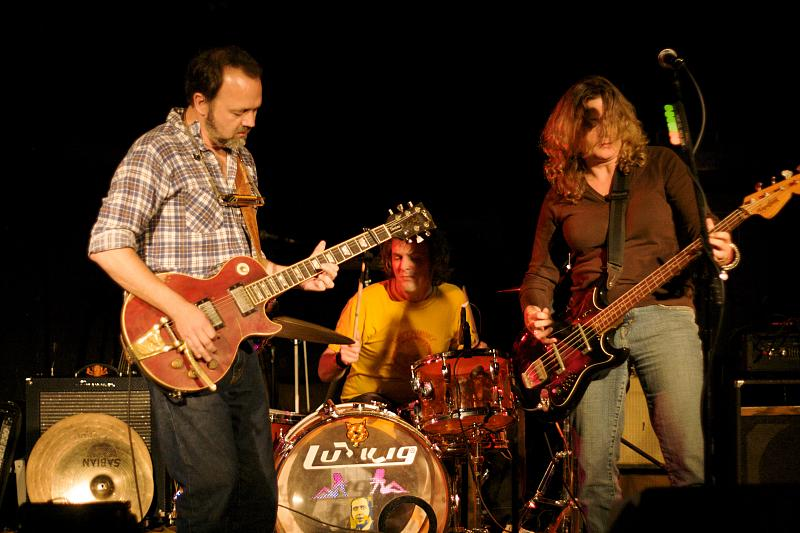
- Cary Hudson & Blue Mountain playing at The Bottleneck in Lawrence, Kansas, April 18, 2008.

Background information
- Born: 1963 (age 62–63); Sumrall, Mississippi, United States
- Genres: Americana, Southern rock, blues, blues rock, alt.country, country rock, roots rock
- Occupations: Singer-songwriter, musician, producer, bandleader
- Instruments: Electric guitar, acoustic guitar, slide guitar, harmonica, mandolin, banjo, piano, keyboards, fiddle
- Years active: 1989–present
- Labels: Glitterhouse Records, Black Dog Records
- Website: caryhudson.com

Cary Hudson is an American lead singer, guitarist and main songwriter of the alternative country/Southern rock band Blue Mountain.

== Biography ==
Hudson was born in the town of Sumrall, Mississippi, located approximately 15 miles from Hattiesburg. Prior to Blue Mountain, Hudson was in a band called The Hilltops, and Blue Mountain formed out of The Hilltops. Blue Mountain featured numerous drummers, most infamously Frank Coutch, and bassist/wife of Hudson, Laurie Stirratt.

After the divorce of Hudson and Stirratt, Blue Mountain split, and Hudson embarked on a solo career that spawned three albums released on his and his cousin Chris Hudson's record label, Black Dog Records. The first album, The Phoenix was released in 2002. Though Hudson shows his country roots often, many of the tracks feature him on the electric guitar, such as the track "Mad, Bad, & Dangerous".

His second album, Cool Breeze released in 2004, finds Hudson once again using his guitar.

For his third solo album, titled Bittersweet Blues, Hudson made an exclusively acoustic release. Every song displays Hudson's song writing and bluesy voice. From the opening "Snow in Mississippi", the album is a sequence of Mississippi style music. The XM Radio hit, "Berlin Blues", is the ninth track on the record.

In 2007, Hudson reunited with Blue Mountain, and he put his solo career on hold. He resides in his hometown of Sumrall, and can often be seen by the locals of nearby towns as he plays solo shows at some of the establishments in Hattiesburg.

In 2008, Cary Hudson named one of the best in the Gibson magazine's list of Top 10 Alt Country Guitarists of all time.

In 2013, Blue Mountain once again dissolved and Hudson has now refocused on his solo output. He released an album, Town and Country in the summer of 2014 and continues to tour on his own.

== Solo discography ==
- The Phoenix (2002)
- Cary Hudson Electric Trio Live in Wredenhagen (2002) – live
- Cool Breeze (2004)
- Bittersweet Blues (2006)
- Seems to Me (2010)
- Mississippi Moon (2011)
- Town and Country (2014)
- Ole Blue (2024)
