= Vukovar Plateau =

Coordinates: 45.26°N 19.03°E

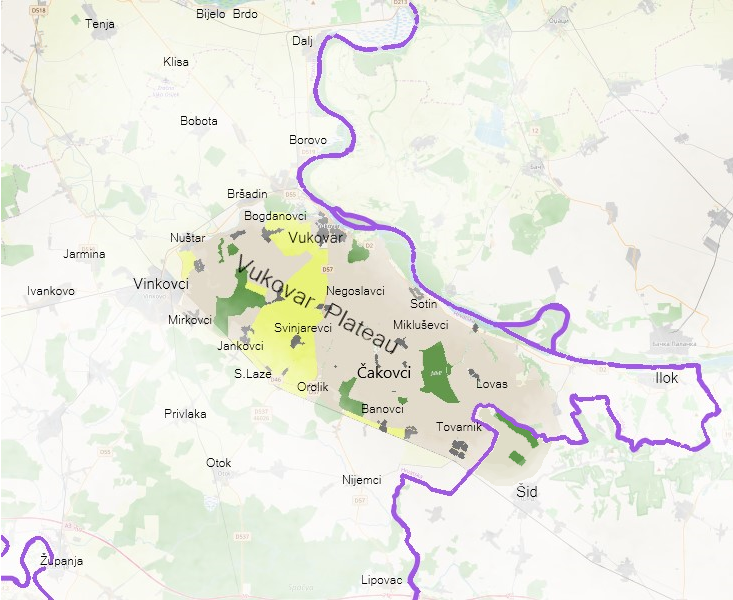
Vukovar Plateau

Vukovar Plateau (Croatian: Vukovarski ravnjak, Serbian: Вуковарски равњак / Vukovarski ravnjak) is a low loess plateau in eastern Croatia in the region of Syrmia named after the town of Vukovar. The eponymous town of Vukovar originally developed on the tall Danubian riverbank slopes of the plateau. The plateau represent western Syrmian drainage divide between the Danube and Sava rivers leading up to Fruška Gora hills further east. Drainage divide formed by the plateau nevertheless does not form impenetrable hydraulic barrier but rather area of differentiated levels of water transmissivity.

Together with Spačva basin and Sava basin it is one of the primary microregions of the Vukovar-Srijem County. Numerous prehistoric areological sites were discovered on the plateau which represented optimal condition for human settlement and important communication route. Southwest edge of the plateau reaches the village of Mirkovci, suburb of Vinkovci, while eastern edges of the plateau reach Šarengrad, Bapska and the town of Šid in neighbouring Serbia. The region is home to one of the last remaining steppe grasslands in Croatia near the village of Opatovac.

== Gallery ==
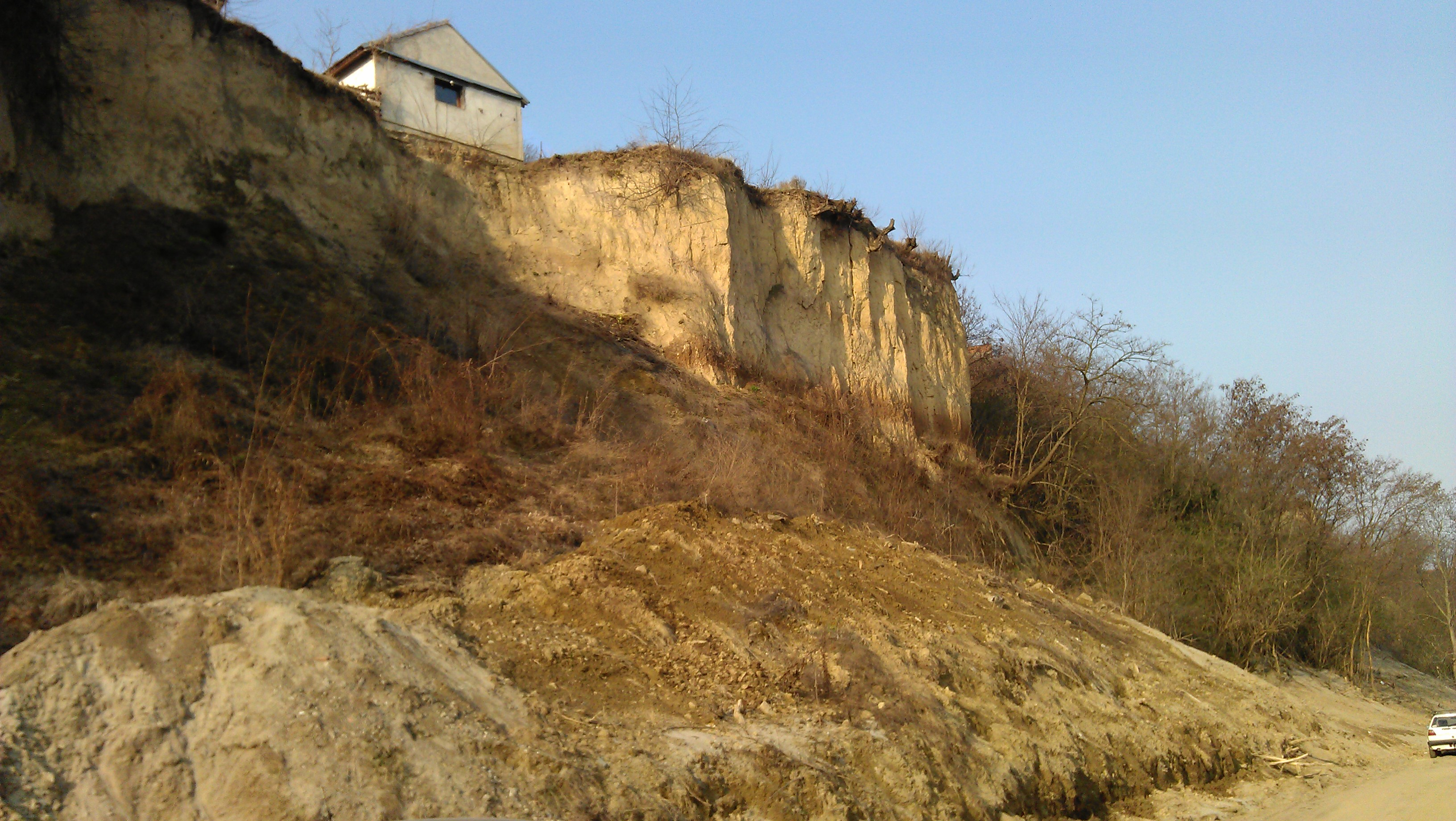
loess plateau Vukovar

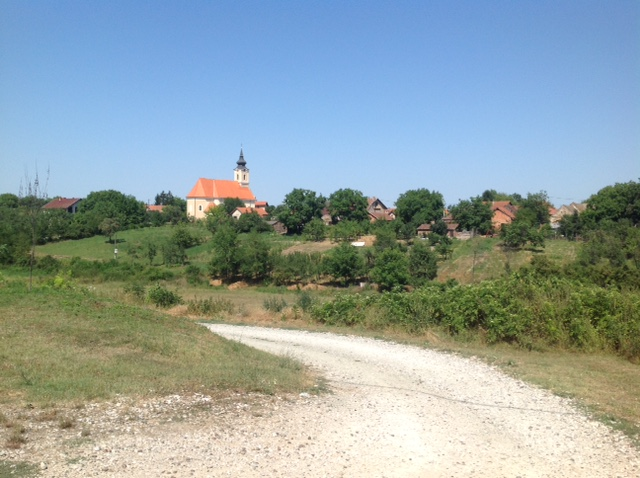
Stari Jankovci

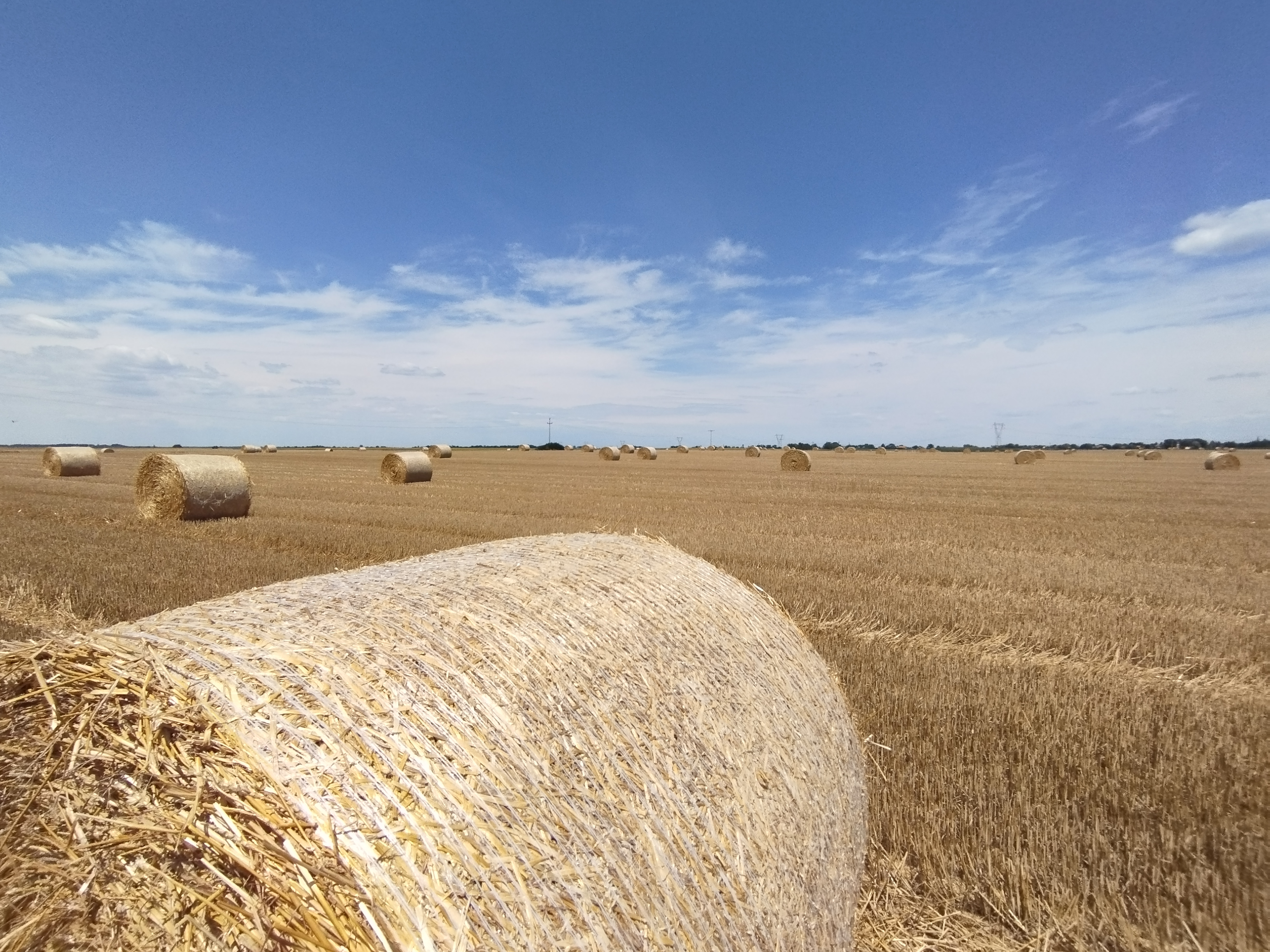
Negoslavci

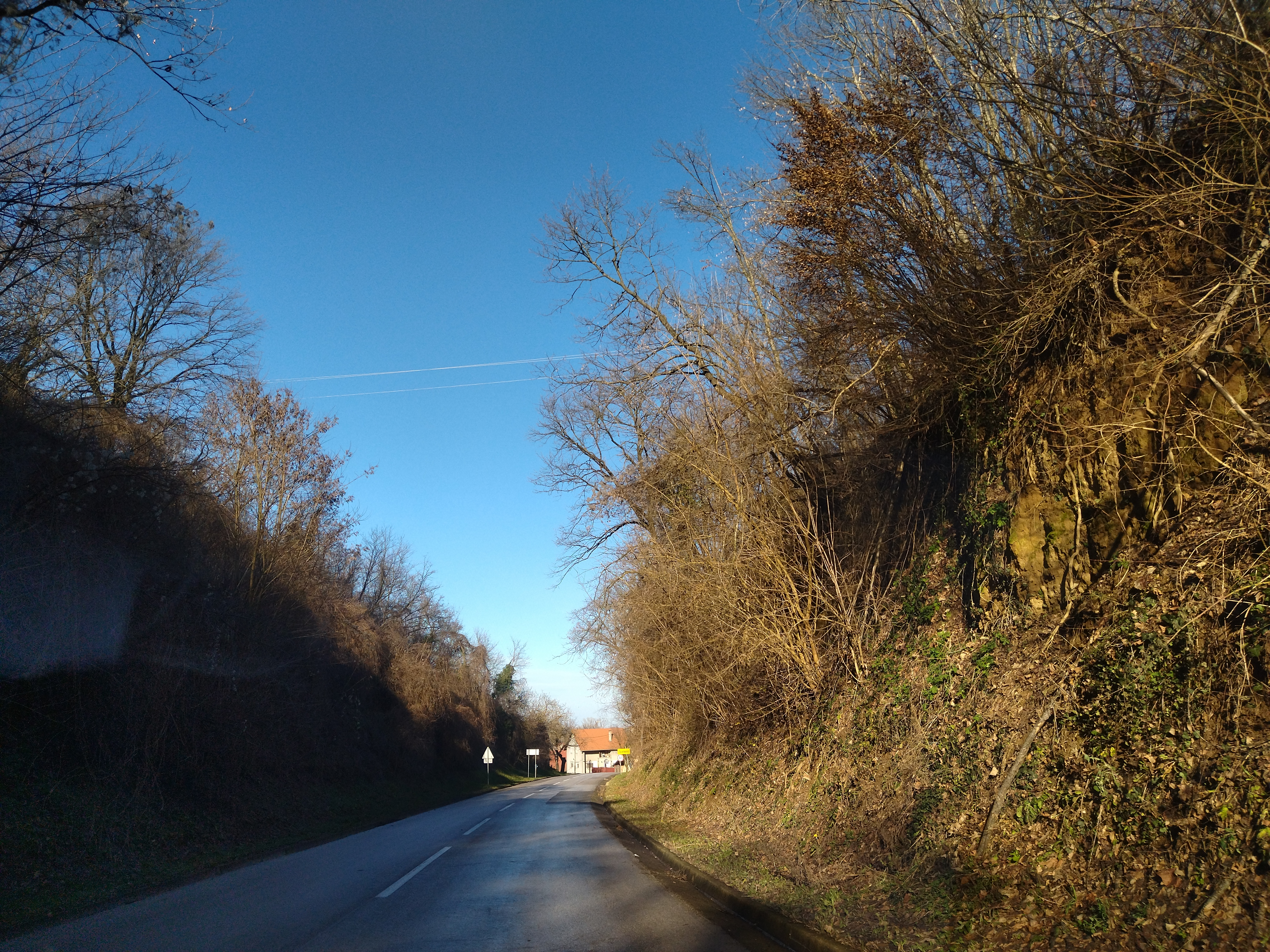
Opatovac

== See also ==
- Vučedol culture
- Vučedol
- Vučedol Culture Museum
