= Kratkofil International Short Film Festival =

Kratkofil Plus International Film Festival
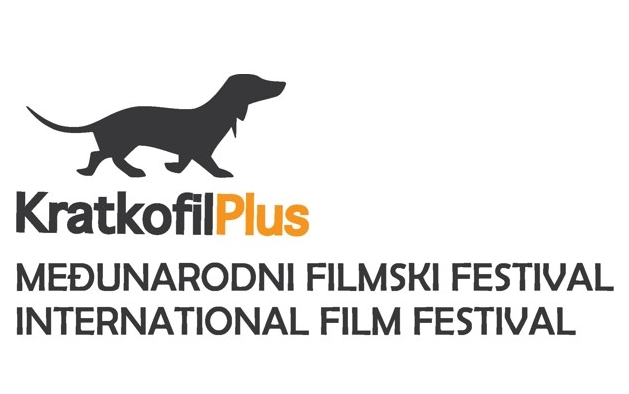
- Location: Banja Luka, Bosnia and Herzegovina
- Established: 2007
- Artistic director: Darija Buzaković
- Language: International
- Website: http://www.kratkofil.org

Kratkofil (also known as Kratkofil Plus) is an international short film festival that takes place in Banja Luka, Bosnia-Herzegovina in the summer. The first festival was held in 2007, followed by successful 8 editions. The new name International Film Festival Kratkofil Plus, as well as new programming and universal branding were introduced in the 2010 reconstruction-themed edition. The 8th edition of the festival was under final preparations when Bosnia was hit by disastrous floods in May 2014, causing the festival to move dates and announce a more simplified 3-day format for 2014 which was eventually held from 22 to 24 July 2014, while the 9th edition took place in the usual format in 2015. While announcements were expected for the jubilee 10th edition in 2016, the festival team announced a project hiatus, due to low government support for the project and the film industry.

== About the festival ==
Kratkofil promotes alternative film expression and is a project of Creative Artists Association "Lanterna", a Banja Luka-based NGO. It aims to be a film event where both professionals and amateurs involved with film art have an opportunity to enjoy, explore and support non-mainstream films, and in particular the short film genre which is popular among first-time film-makers.

Kratkofil screens feature, documentary, experimental and animation films. They are sourced from Bosnian, regional and international cinema.

International Short Film Festival "Kratkofil" appeared for the first time in Banjaluka in 2007. Since then, "Kratkofil" has shown thousands of feature, animated, documentary and experimental short movies from all over the world. In cooperation with similar festivals such as Clermont-Ferrand, Tampere, Sidney, Dublin, Uppsala and Motovun, audience in Banja Luka were provided with quality section of events regarding the world of short films that include some "evergreen", avant-garde, controversial and experimental work. Festival's great uniqueness is the program called "Focus", which is mainly concentrated on Grand Prix winning country from the previous festival, thanks to which the guests of the festival have the opportunity to get more familiar with the cinema, culture, art and traditions of a country or region. So far, focuses were on Poland, Iceland, Finland, Belgium, Netherlands and Australia. Next edition's "focus" will be on Sweden, with a possibility of extending cultural and cinematic focus on several countries and regions, aside from the previous Grand Prix winner's country.

After only 6 years, Kratkofil Plus became no1 cultural project in Republic of Srpska and Banja Luka, in regards to attendance, scope of the festival and the media support it receives. It became well known for its main competition venue being at the Kastel, a medieval fortress, where the Open Air Theatre is held since 2010, which holds around 1500 spectators per screening, in the prime-time evening slots. Kastel is also used by the festival for a number of different venues, such as Secret garden, a lounge area guests, partners and visitors, as well as other venues within the city such as: Staklenac the press venue in the city's downtown park Petar Kocic, the Banja Luka's Youth Home as the Festival Center, The National Theatre of Republic of Srpska, for day-time screenings and other downtown space, varying by edition.

== 2007 ==
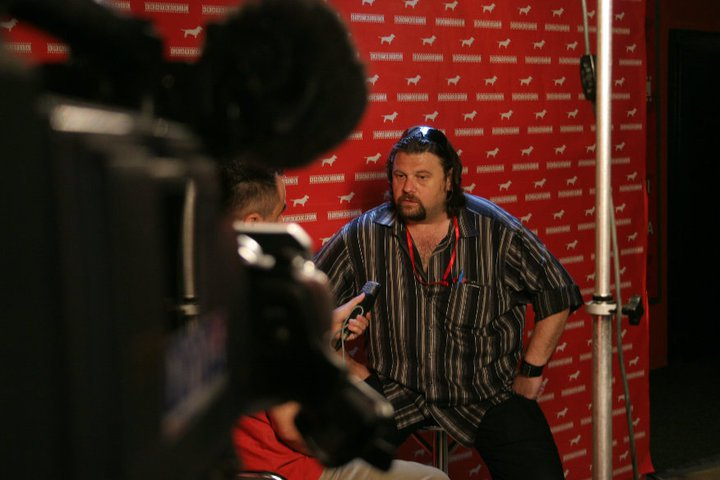
Kratkofil 2007

Kratkofil was founded in 2007 and was, at the time, the first film festival in Banja Luka and Republic of Srpska. The idea was to fill the gap in the film industry of the country, where short film form was not present at all, but was a starting point for most of the young directors of the country. It brought many significant film names to Banja Luka, for the first time, and gave young film-makers and the audience a chance to experience the international atmosphere, make contacts, educate in master class workshops and enjoy the additional entertainment and cultural programs.

For the best film in 2007, the five-member jury consisting of Gian Vittorio Baldi, producer and director, Jack Gerbes, director of the Maryland Film Office, Goran Dević, director, Pjer Žalica, director and Miroslav Momčilović, director, decided to give Grand Prix to the film "Seed," by the Polish director Wojceha Kaspersky. According to the jury, this film, in the best traditions of the Eastern conciliation film documentary, manages to show a reconciliation with a personal tragedy, a film that does not waste any time feeling for nuance and its qualities retain in what is unsaid.

Gian Vittorio Baldi, producer and director from Italy, said that he was honored by the fact he was invited to the first International Short Film Festival "Kratkofil", which was held in Banja Luka, and he pointed the quality of the films shown, and also he wished a long life to the festival. Famous Croatian director Lordan Zafranovic had a master class for young film-makers.

== 2008 ==
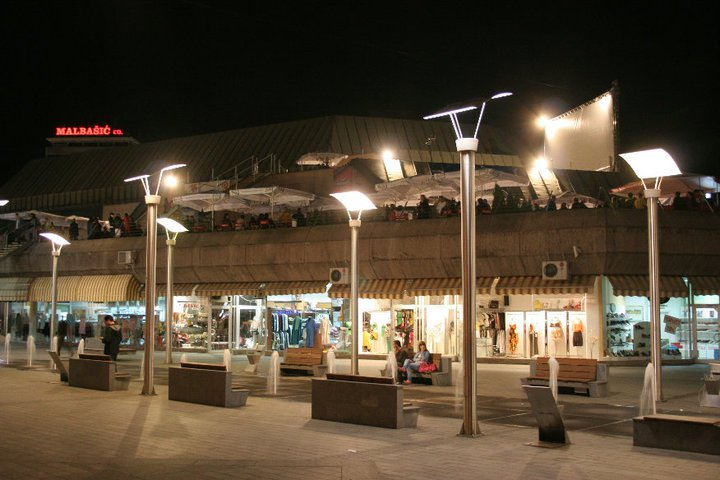
Kratkofil 2008 Open Air Theatre on Boska Shopping Center

At the second International Short Film Festival Kratkofil 2008 Grand Prix award won the film "Wrestling" from Iceland, directed by Grimur Hákonarson. The film is described as a simple, modest, perfectly formed portrait of hidden emotions in a remote part of Iceland, who told us a lot, with genuine emotions.

2008 jury of the festival were Heinz Hermanns from Interfilm festival in Berlin, Milorad Milinkovic, director, Đelo Hadžiselimović, producer, and Gaelle Jones, producer in Chateau-Rouge, Production Company in Paris and Wojcich Kasperski. Kasperski, director from Poland, was in the jury due to the new rule of the festival that the winning film director is a member of the jury in the next edition of the festival. " From Script to Screen Workshop" was held for Bosnian and international young filmmakers. Among many speakers there were Robert Nickson, producer and professor from New York, 2008, Carlo Varini, DoP and a professor at La Femis school in Paris, Alastair Thorne, writer and professor at UCLA, Todd Rohal, independent filmmaker from NYC, Kiril Dzajkovski, composer for LA and Skopje, Nikola Pejakovic, actor, writer and director from Bosnia and Herzegovina.

"All this is very nice. I think it's a good festival, especially as it brought so many filmmakers to socialize. I had the unforgettable experience while teaching and I tried to tell a lot about producing and how authors can persuade producers to open their wallets and fund projects," said Nickson.

In its 2nd edition, the festival, for the first time, introduced the Open Air Theatre, which was constructed by the festival in the very city center on the roof of the Boska mall. The festival further occupied all city center available venues, to satisfy the screenings of its growing number of program slots as well as a number of cultural side-program events and the organization.

== 2009 ==
The Finnish film director Jan Ijäs with the film "Ghosts" won the Grand Prix of Kratkofil 2009. Every day in newspapers and on television we face world full of suffering and pain, it is necessarily to create a certain emotional distance. This means that we are receiving unpleasant information, but they do not have any effect on us. The theme of this film is the sheer fact that is present everywhere in the world. In the third year the festival jury consisted of Grimur Hákonarson, Icelandic director, Jovan Todorović, director, Nikola Stojanović, director, Jukka Pekka Easier, director of Tampere Film Festival and director Evald Oterstad.

In 2009, the festival moved its Open Air theatre to the roof of the National Theatre of Republic of Srpska, with an attractive view of the city center. The third edition was promoted under the slogan Profit vs. Art, when the festival focused on industry's struggle to survive in the times of financial crisis. In accordance to this, the festival declared itself as a non-profit event, completely abolishing charging of entrance to any festival events.

== 2010 Reconstruction ==
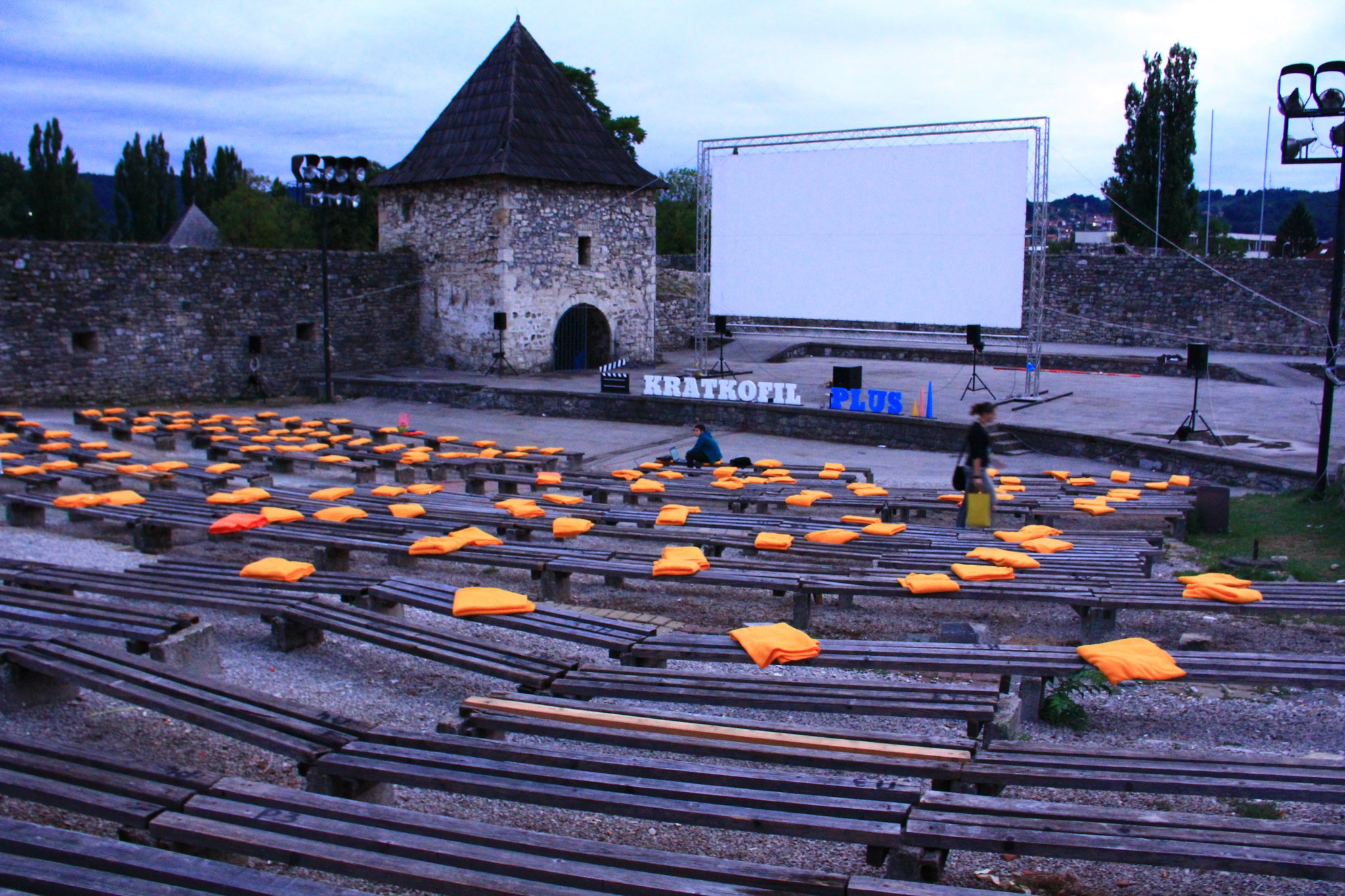
Kratkofil Plus 2011 Open Air Theatre at Kastel fortress

Through a process of "reconstruction" which was the motto of "Kratkofil" 2010. there was a change in the concept of the festival. The International Short Film Festival "Kratkofil" has changed its name to International Film Festival "Kratkofil Plus". That year's festival did not have the competition program.

Through these changes, we wanted to offer the audience in Banja Luka new facilities that will enable them to see extraordinary performances of film, while not to be saturated with a single cinematic expression. During this year we introduced the new Open Air Theatre, which is now held at the Kastel fortress where feature films are screened that the audience didn't have a chance to see in the cinema distribution. - said the festival director. Exclusivity on the festival in 2010 was "I Already Am Everything I Want to Have," from director Dane Komljen, which won third place at the Cannes Film Festival, in competition "Sinefondasion". One of the most independent film-maker Želimir Žilnik while opening Kratkofil 2010 wished that festival has many more successful years.

"The fact that the film that opens the festival, has achieved great success at Cannes, and that this is an author who is from Banja Luka says that 'Kratkofil' has a good basis to develop and improve. The enthusiasm of the team that prepared 'Kratkofil' and the audience that filled the fortress are the force upon which festival should grow and last. ", said Žilnik.

== 2011 ==
In 2011 the festival goes back to the thing which makes a festival, and that is a competitive program. It introduced a three-member jury: Iva Peer-Divjak, Belgrade producer, Ljubisa Savanović, actor from Banja Luka and Finnish filmmakers Jan Ijas awarded the film "Stardust", directed by Nicolas Provost from Belgium.

In the opinion of the jury, stated that the main prize went to the Provost "unique cinematic reflection of everyday life in the film where the characters are identified with common people and in return get a little stardust." Throughout the festival many local, regional and international filmmakers have appeared as guests and lecturers. Among others appeared: Želimir Žilnik, director, Lazar Stojanović, director, Robert Zuber, journalist and director, Boris Mitić, Iva Plemić Divjak, producer, Marko Vidojković, writer and many others.

== 2012 ==
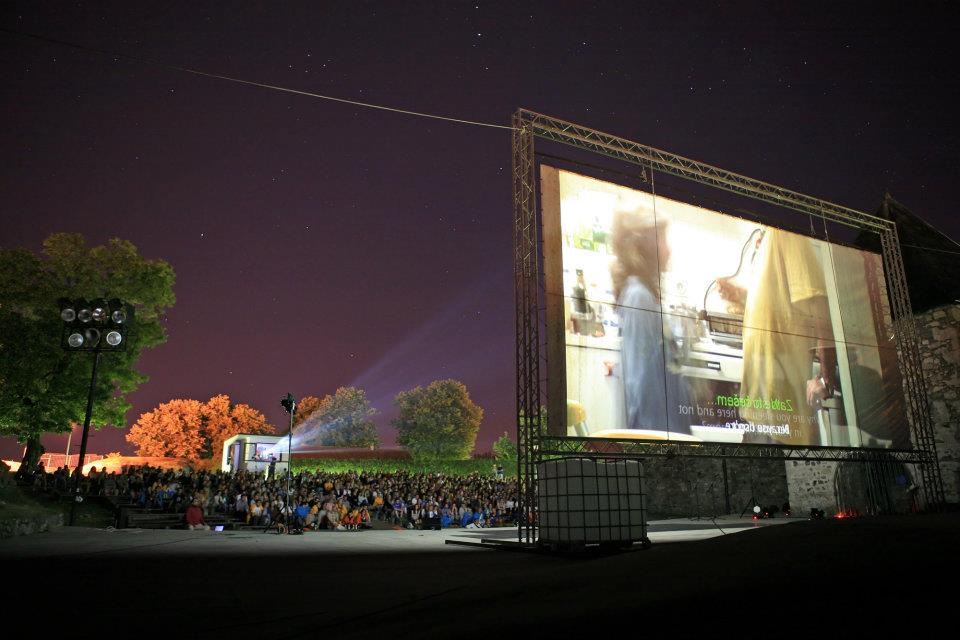
Kratkofil Plus 2012 Open Air Theatre in the prime-time evening slot

International Film Festival Kratkofil Plus was held from 18 to 22 July and the main locations in the city for movie lovers were Youth Center and fortress Kastel. This year's festival was held under the motto "Motorso", with the following explanation: Because, while trying to discover traces of all those tendencies that appear in man's head and which set in motion its controlling activity, one gets the impression that those tendencies move from downward to upward. Triggered by driving force of your heart, stomach and genitalia, the tendencies flood from torso into the head. One could say that the moving complex inside your torso gives drive to the controlling complex inside your head, like a motor, like "motorso".

More than fifty short films from around the world competed for the Grand Prix and awards for best feature, documentary, animated, experimental and regional film, with the regional category covering the former Yugoslavia. Kratkofil Plus also screened a selection of BAFTA short films, The Artist Is Present and Whore’s Glory.

== 2013 ==
The 7th edition of the festival took place from 24 to 28 July 2013 with daily projection held at the Banja Luka Youth Center and evening screenings being held at the well known fortress Kastel. 44 short film from around the world participated in the competition program, with hundreds more shown in the side programs such as: the selection of BAFTA films, Timishort, Zubroffka, a selection of student films from the Academy of Arts in Banja Luka and Friends program. During the primetime evening slots, 4 feature-length films were screened: The Act of Killing, Harry Dean Stanton: Partly Fiction, Hives and Pussy Riot: A Punk Prayer. The festival program also included, for the second time, the Kratkofil Junior project, a charter project of Kratkofil, which includes screenings of children and teen films, as well as film-making workshops which resulted in a short film entitled The Apple of Discord, which premiered at the last day of Kratkofil. Dozens of directors, producers and other industry workers were guests at the festival. Other cultural events were a part of the program as well, mostly in the evenings at lounge venues of the Kastel fortress, such as promotions, concerts and parties. The 8th edition of the festival is under preparations, and it is expected to be held between 23 and 27 July 2014. The call for submissions for the competition program were closed on 7 April 2014, and the competition list is expected to be announced in the second part of May 2014.

== 2014 ==
The festival's 8th edition was largely marked by the disastrous floods that affected Bosnia and Herzegovina in May 2014, when the festival was already in its final preparations for July. Due to the scope of the natural disaster and numerous difficulties whole country experienced, the festival announced the simplification of the 2014 edition. Eventually, the festival was held over the course of only 3 days, focusing on the competition program and several other side events. Kratkofil Junior, one of the charter projects focusing on children and youth, was the center of the festival. 3 short films shot and produced by a group of children with the supervision of the professionals, prior to the festival, had its premiere at the opening night with the young participants announcing the opening before some 1500 spectators. The Panorama Program featured Ping Pong Summer, a US festival hit by Michael Tully, as well as The Undertaker by Dragan Nikolić while several other side programs were held in day-time slots. During the festival, a cooperation with Norrköping Filmfestival Flimmer was announced, in an attempt to start the international version of Kratkofil's famous Kratkofil Punch charter project on amateur socially-oriented documentary film-making. The start of the project was scheduled for 2015.

== Grand Prix winners ==
Year	Film	Director	Jury members
2007	Seed	(Poland) Wojceha Kaspersky	Gian Vittorio Baldi, Jack Gerbes, Goran Dević, Pjer Žalica, Miroslav Momčilović
2008	Wrestling	(Iceland) Grimur Hákonarson	Heinz Hermanns, Milorad Milinković, Đelo Hadžiselimović, Gaelle Jones, Wojceha Kaspersky
2009	Ghosts	(Finland) Jan Ijäs	Grimur Hákonarson, Jovan Todorović, Nikola Stojanović, Jukka Pekka Easier, Evald Oterstad
2010	No competition	No competition	No competition
2011	Stardust	(Belgium) Nicolas Provost	Iva Peer-Divjak, Ljubisa Savanović, Jan Ijas
2012	At the Formal	(Australia) Andrew Kavanagh	Oliver Sertić, Tristan Priimagi, Juan Carleveris
2013	The Noble Stud	(Sweden) Sofia Priftis, Linus Hartin	Corina Schwingruber Ilic, Daniel Ebner, Božidar Trkulja
2014	Mont d'Or	(Belgium) Karen Vazquez Guadarrama	Eva Pa, Elin Bennett, Miloš Milošević
2015	Shipwreck	(Netherlands) Morgan Knibbe	Nikola Majdak, Karen Vazquez Guadarrama, Mark Steele

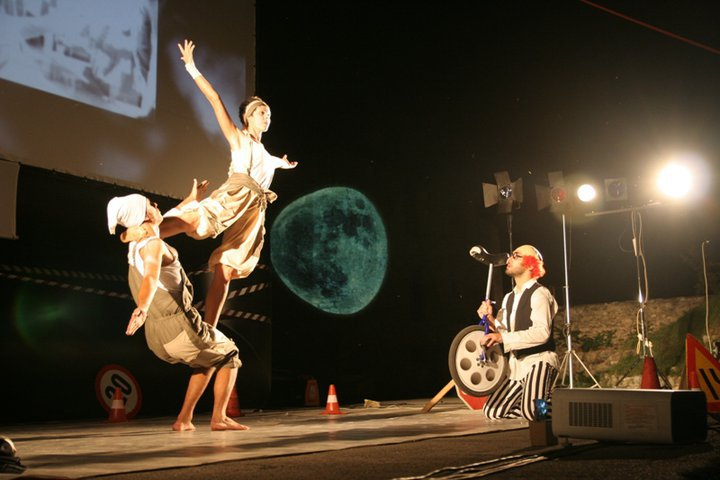

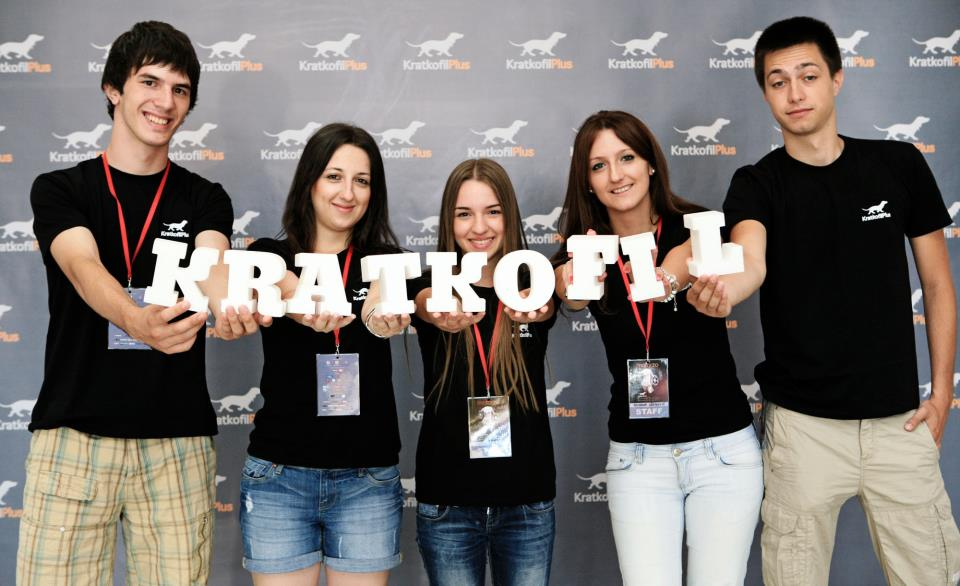

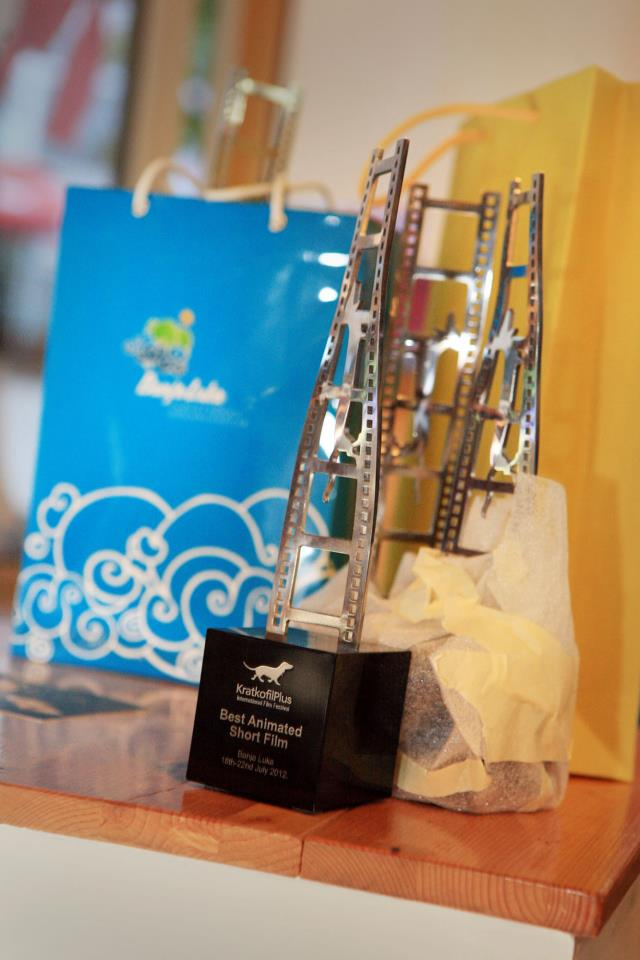

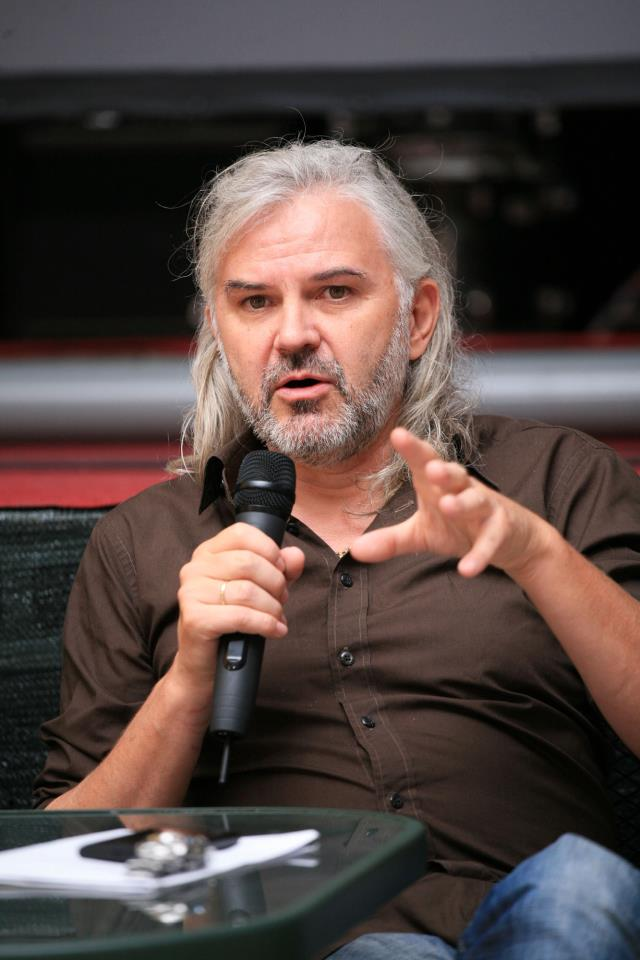

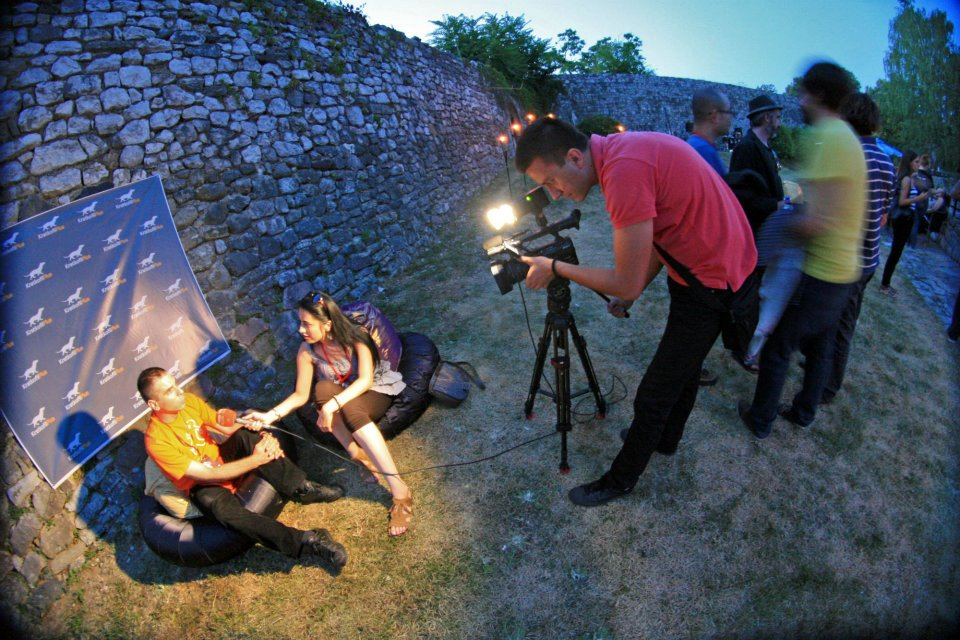

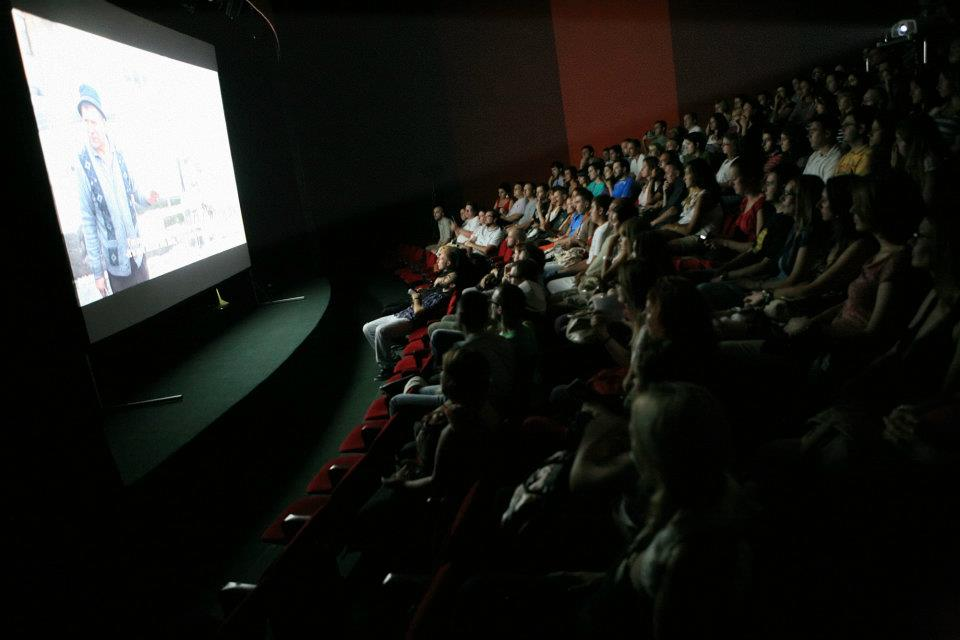
