= Stefan Lampadius =

German actor and filmmaker (born 1976)

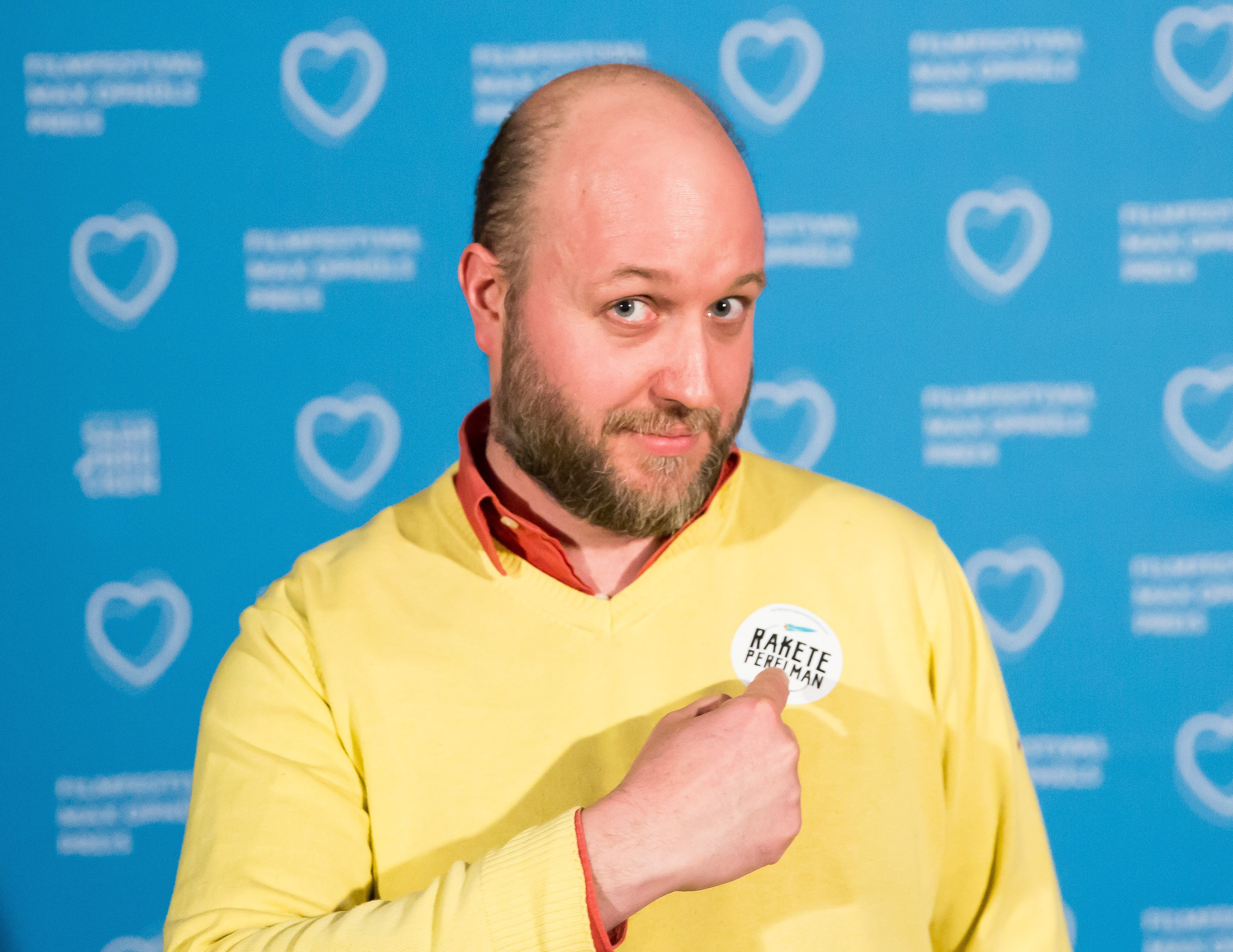
- Born: November 17, 1976 (age 49); Aurich, West Germany
- Occupations: Actor, filmmaker
- Years active: 2001–present

Stefan Lampadius (born November 17, 1976) is a German actor and filmmaker.

== Biography ==
Stefan Lampadius grew up in Emden. After graduating from high school and completing vocational training in Stuttgart, he studied Audiovisual media at the Academy of Media Arts Cologne from 2003. Lampadius also took part in acting workshops at the Film Academy Baden-Württemberg and the Academy of Media Arts Cologne from 2003 to 2007.

After graduating from the Academy of Media Arts Cologne in 2010, Lampadius began working primarily as a film and television actor. One of his first acting experiences was in the TV series Stromberg, which was based on the series The Office, and through which he became known to a wider audience in Germany. This was followed by further roles in television productions, feature films, music videos and commercials. Lampadius made his International film debut in the anthology movie Hives (2012), in which he played the engineer Ralf. The movie had its international premiere at the 60th San Sebastián International Film Festival (Spain). Lampadius also appeared in the feature film West (2013) by Christian Schwochow and the Netflix series We Are the Wave (2019), which is loosely based on the 1981 novel The Wave.

Since the end of the 1990s, Lampadius has worked in various roles in film productions and also realized his own short films. Early works include the video recordings of a Dortmund concert for the English post-punk band And Also the Trees, which appeared on their video album Live 89–98. His short film Painters at work (2017) was nominated for the German Short Film Award, among others. The experimental music video Dynamo (music: Namosh), celebrated its international festival premiere at the Lausanne Underground Film and Music Festival in 2021. In 2024, Lampadius was a member of the festival jury for the Bamberg Short Film Festival.

== Selected filmography ==
=== Film / Television ===
- 2005: Max und Moritz Reloadedy (movie)
- 2007: Blind Flight (Blindflug) (movie)
- 2007: Alles was zählt (TV series)
- 2008: In Between Days (Die Besucherin) (movie)
- 2009: The Two Lives of Daniel Shore (Die zwei Leben des Daniel Shore)
- 2010: Zeche is nich – Sieben Blicke auf das Ruhrgebiet (TV movie)
- 2011: Alive and Ticking (Ein Tick anders)
- 2011: Someone Like Him (Einer wie Bruno) (movie)
- 2012: Stromberg (TV series), (appearance in 38 episodes from 2005 to 2012)
- 2012: Idiotentest (TV movie)
- 2012: The Spectator (Der Zuschauer), (experimental film)
- 2012: Hives (Košnice)
- 2012: Keep Up the Good Work (Frohes Schaffen – Ein Film zur Senkung der Arbeitsmoral) (documentary)
- 2013: Trimbelten (short film)
- 2013: Wilsberg – Die Entführung (TV series)
- 2013: The Invention of Love (Die Erfindung der Liebe)
- 2013: 00 Schneider – Im Wendekreis der Eidechse (movie)
- 2013: West (Westen)
- 2014: Stromberg – Der Film
- 2014: The last cop (Der letzte Bulle) (TV series), (appearance in 3 episodes from 2012 to 2014)
- 2014: Danni Lowinski (TV series), (appearance in 2 episodes in 2012 and in 2014)
- 2015: Ein starkes Team (TV series)
- 2015: 3 Türken & ein Baby
- 2016: Bittersweet (Bittersüß) (movie)
- 2017: Rocket Perelman (Rakete Perelman)
- 2017: Club der roten Bänder – Die Liste, (TV series)
- 2018: Alarm für Cobra 11 – Die Autobahnpolizei – Kein Entkommen (TV series)
- 2019: We Are the Wave (TV series), (appearance in 3 episodes)
- 2020: SOKO Wismar – Der Tod fährt Pedelec (TV series)
- 2022: King of Stonks (TV series)
- 2023: The Three Detectives (Die drei !!!) – Curse of the Witch (TV series)
- 2024: Gridlocked
- 2024: Mord mit Aussicht (TV series)

=== Director / Screenwriter / Miscellaneous ===
- 1998: And Also The Trees – Live 89–98 (Video album), (camera)
- 2017: Painters at work (Die Maler kommen), (direction, screenplay, production)
- 2019: Namosh – Dynamo (music video), (direction, screenplay, editing)
- 2026: The Soloists (Die Solisten) (documentary film), (screenplay and camera)

== Awards and nominations (selection) ==
- 2011: Team-Work-Award for Thomas, Thomas at the Stuttgarter Filmwinter Festival for expanded media
- 2017: Nomination for Painters at work in the category Best Feature Film at 27th Bamberg Short Film Festival
- 2017: Nomination for Painters at work for the Jury-Award in the category German Competition at the 33rd Hamburg International Short Film Festival
- 2017: Audience award for Painters at work at the Short Film Festival Cologne (KFFK)
- 2018: Nomination for Painters at work in the category Best Short Film at the 21st Motovun Film Festival
