= Steffen Jürgens =

- Born: 27 July 1967 (age 58); Braunschweig, West Germany
- Occupations: Actor and Film director
- Years active: 1995–present

Steffen Jürgens or Steffen C. Jürgens (born 27 July 1967) is a German actor and film director.

== Life and work ==
After Jürgens studied at the German art college HBK Braunschweig, he went in 1997 to Ludwigsburg to continue his study at the Film Academy Baden-Wuerttemberg, where he focused on film direction. In 2003, Jürgens finished his study with a diploma. One year later his debut film Der Ärgermacher was released in German cinemas.

Steffen Jürgens also works as independent screenplay author. As an actor, he appeared in a few German TV movies, films and commercials. Furthermore, he took part in of the first German web series for the German Video hosting service watch berlin. The series was called Der Kulturterrorist. Steffen Jürgens played the fictitious character Jochen Antrazith, who confronted the Berlin citizens with cultural and political themes and provocative statements, comparable to figures like Borat or Horst Schlämmer.

In the late 1990s while Jürgens researched for his short feature film Stuhlberg - Der jüngste Manager Europas, he accompanied Lolo Ferrari, billed as "the woman with the largest breasts in the world", during her tour through German TV-talk shows and discos, filmed her and got to know her German manager, Martin Baldauf. Jürgens was fascinated by this charismatic and egocentric person. So, his short film Stuhlberg - Der jüngste Manager Europas was—not as planned—more a film about Martin Baldauf than Lolo Ferrari. In the movie Jürgens plays Martin Baldauf under the name Daniel Luigi Baldauf, which is the main character in the movie. Lolo Ferrari plays an underpart. When Stuhlberg - Der jüngste Manager Europas was finished, Jürgens furthermore takes an interest in Martin Baldauf. After the death of Lolo Ferrari, he, and sometimes the German film producer Rüdiger Heinze, accompanied and filmed Martin Baldauf during his business activities in Germany and the Czech Republic, where he lives and works in the meantime. With the recorded video material, Jürgens created the controversial documentary portrait Der Generalmanager oder How To Sell A Tit Wonder about Martin Baldauf. In 2008 this film was released in German cinemas.

Steffen Jürgens lives in Berlin.

== Filmography (selection) ==
- 1998: ...die man liebt...
- 2000: 8 Grad Celsius
- 2001: My Brother the Vampire (Mein Bruder, der Vampir)
- 2001: The Life of C. Brunner (Das Leben des C. Brunner)
- 2003: The Troublemaker (Der Ärgermacher) , (director, Screenplay author and actor)
- 2003: Play It Loud! (Verschwende deine Jugend)
- 2004: Baal (TV movie)
- 2004: Experiment Bootcamp (TV movie)
- 2004: Don't Look for Me (Such mich nicht)
- 2004: Off Beat (Kammerflimmern)
- 2005: Max und Moritz Reloaded
- 2006: Storm Tide (TV movie)
- 2006: A Mere Formality
- 2006: Zores (TV movie)
- 2006: Polizeiruf 110 (TV series)
- 2006: Der Generalmanager oder How to sell a Tit Wonder (director and cinematographer)
- 2007: Kahlschlag (TV movie)
- 2008: 1 May: All Belongs to You (1. Mai)
- 2008: In Between Days (Die Besucherin)
- 2008: The Clearing (Die Lichtung)
- 2009: Claudia - Das Mädchen von Kasse 1 (TV movie)
- 2009: Résiste - Aufstand der Praktikanten
- 2012: A Coffee in Berlin
- 2012: Hives (Košnice)
- 2016: Bittersweet (Bittersüß)
- 2016: Ku'damm 56
- 2017: Notruf Hafenkante - Die Abrechnung (TV series)
- 2024: Gridlocked

== Awards and nominations ==
- 2007: At the Adolf Grimme Awards the German Video hosting service watch berlin, where Steffen Jürgen appeared as Kulturterrorist was nominated for the Grimme Online Award.
- 2017: Award Best Supporting Actor at the Romanian film festival Best Film Awards for Bitterweet
