= Hives (film) =

- International film poster
- Directed by: Boaz Debby; Michael Lennox; Simon Dolensky; Tomáš Kratochvíl; Igor Seregi
- Written by: Boaz Debby; Simon Dolensky; Tomáš Kratochvíl; Igor Seregi; Regina Moriarty; Stefan Gustav Zinke
- Produced by: Ivan Kelava
- Starring: Akbar Kurtha; Stefan Lampadius; Nili Tserruya; Luboš Veselý; Ozren Grabarić
- Music by: Jered Sorkin
- Release date: 27 July 2012 (Pula Film Festival)
- Running time: 72, 70 (Pula Film Festival) minutes
- Countries: Croatia; Germany; England; Israel; Czech Republic
- Languages: Croatian, German, English, Hebrew, Czech

Hives (Croatian: Košnice) is a 2012 Croatian anthology film. It had its national premiere at the 59th Pula Film Festival (Croatia) and its international premiere at the 60th San Sebastián International Film Festival (Spain).

== Plot ==
The stories of Hives take place in five European cities: Zagreb, Jerusalem, London, Cologne and Prague. News reports, which inform about a mysterious and worldwide disappearance of bees, connect the stories of the different episodes. The five protagonists of the film listen to these news reports.

=== Jerusalem ===
Thursday morning. The schoolteacher Nira, who worries about her marriage, goes to work. One of her pupils jumps out and performs a love rap song he wrote for her. For a moment her heart faints. A moment, which changes her life.

=== London ===
Ahmad is an illegal immigrant and a very helpful and positive person, who brings also confidence to other fellows. During his bus ride Ahmad learns to know a desperate man. But he doesn't want to listen to Ahmad's well-meant advice. The fellow passenger has killed his girl friend and faces Ahmad with a hard decision.

=== Cologne ===
The engineer Ralf struggles with interpersonal relationships. He is hardly spontaneous. He loves safety and routine in his life. In the morning Cologne - traffic jam on the way to his work, Ralf is one of many, but still isolated. Impressed by the energetic woman in the red car next to him, Ralf jumps over his shadow and tries to contact the woman with the help of a radio host.

=== Prague ===
A priest dozes off on his right hand during the preparation of his ceremony. As the man awakes, his hand looks like it is narcotized. The servant of god tells no one about the nap, because he is ashamed. Instead, he struggles through the usually experienced mass. So his assistant believes that he could have a heart attack.

=== Zagreb ===
The unemployed Matija wanders around. A few months ago he lost his job, but he pretends, that he is still going to work. But by and by the pressure is unbearable.

== Cast and crew ==
Following is the cast and crew of five segments of Hives.

Segment	Director	Writer	Actors
London	Michael Lennox	Regina Moriarty	Akbar Kurtha as Ahmad; Theo Barklem-Biggs as Lee
Cologne	Simon Dolensky	Simon Dolensky & Stefan Gustav Zinke	Stefan Lampadius as Ralf; Sabrina Haus as Katja; Steffen Jürgens as Speaker (voice)
Jerusalem	Boaz Debby	Boaz Debby	Nili Tserruya as Nira; Yiftach Kaminer as Moty; Elad Peretz as Hilel
Prague	Tomáš Kratochvíl	Tomás Kratochvíl	Luboš Veselý as The priest Ján Ctvrtník as Accolite
Zagreb	Igor Seregi	Igor Seregi	Ozren Grabarić as Matija; Ksenija Marinković as Lady in the bus Ljubomir Kerekeš as Alojz; Bojan Navojec as Miran

== Background / Production ==
Hives is a co-production between five European film academies, which was funded by the Croatian Audiovisual Centre / Hrvatski audiovizualni centar (HAVC). Initiated by the Academy of Dramatic Art, University of Zagreb, the film was developed in cooperation with the Internationale Filmschule Köln in Cologne, the Sam Spiegel Film and Television School in Jerusalem, the National Film and Television School in Beaconsfield und the Film and TV School of the Academy of Performing Arts in Prague (FAMU).

== Releases and screenings ==
The film was first shown at the 59th Pula Film Festival on 27 July 2012. On 28 September 2012 the film had its international premier at the 60th San Sebastian film festival.

In 2013, Hives was presented at the European Film Market in the context of the Berlin International Film Festival.

In 2014, the world TV channel Eurochannel released Hives on the internet and aired it later.

From 2012 to 2014, Hives was shown at a lot of international film festivals like Festróia Film Festival (Portugal), Kratkofil International short film festival (Bosnia-Herzegovina), Motovun Film Festival (Croatia), FilmFestival Cottbus - Festival of the East European Cinema (Cottbus), Tel Aviv International Student Film Festival (Israel), Palm Beach International Film Festival (US) or International Film Festival of Kerala (India).

== Awards and nominations ==
- 2012: Nominated for the Golden Arena Awards in the National competition of the Pula Film Festival
- 2013: Award Best “ExYU generation Next” at the Kosovar film festival Skena Up in Priština
