= Vučedol Culture Museum =

Coordinates: 45.3363°N 19.0590°E

- Vučedol Culture Museum

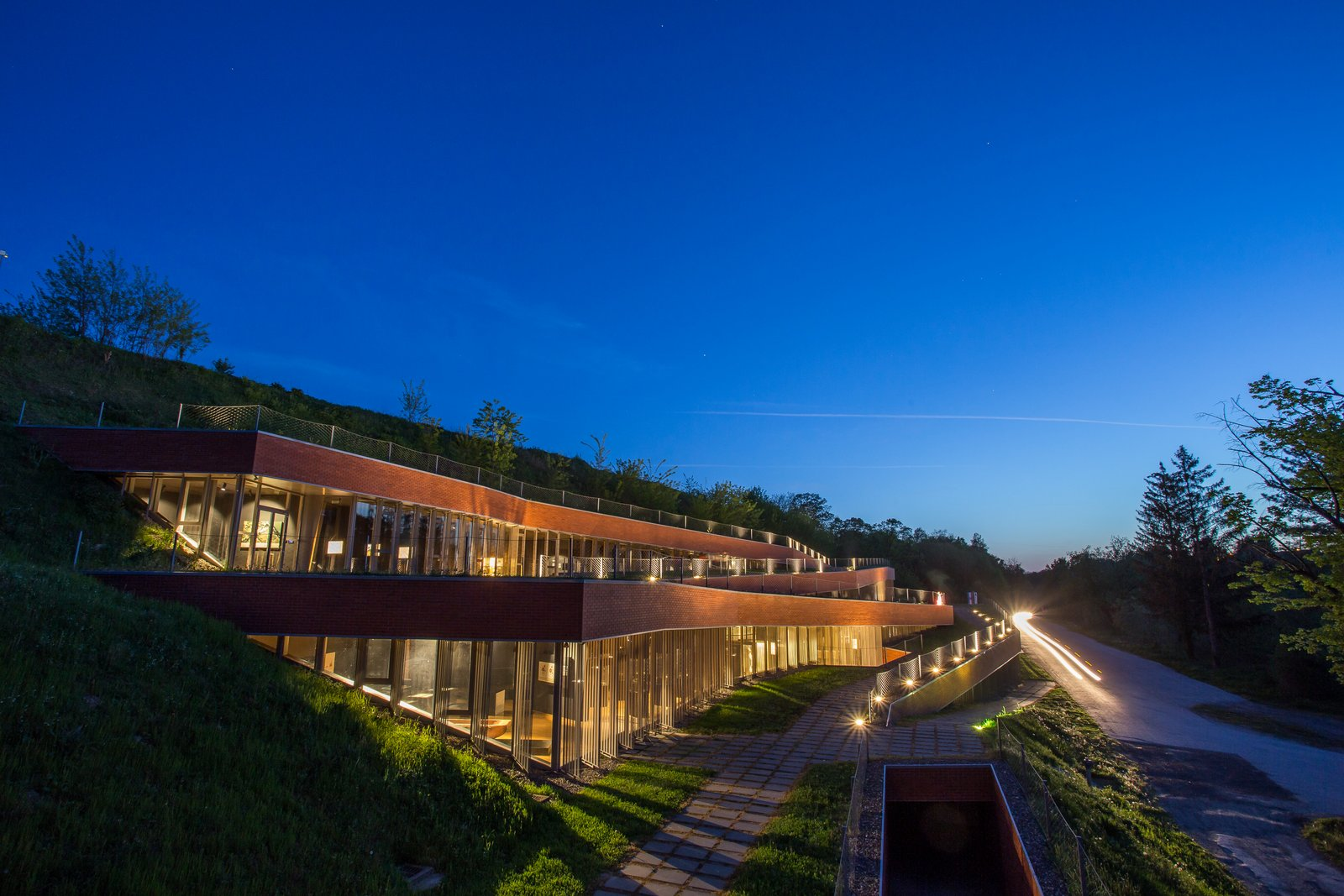
- The view of the museum during twilight
- Established: 30 June 2015
- Location: Vukovar, Croatia
- Type: Archaeological museum
- Collection size: permanent exhibition
- Visitors: 122,721
- Director: Mirela Hutinec
- Curator: Mirna Crnković
- Website: www.vucedol.hr

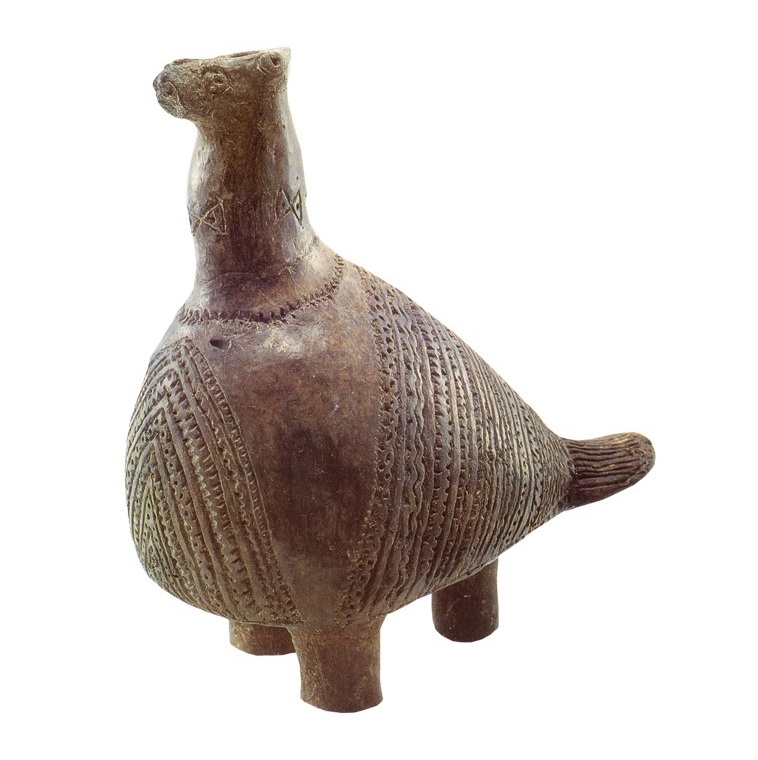
The Vučedol Dove is the most famous prehistoric ceramic vessel found at the Vučedol site near Vukovar, and it is currently housed in the Archaeological Museum in Zagreb.

Vučedol Culture Museum (Croatian: Muzej vučedolske kulture) is a museum of prehistoric culture in at Vučedol, near the city of Vukovar, Croatia.

== History ==
The museum was formally established on the 30 June 2015 by a Croatian Government Decree and was first opened in 2015.

In 2017, Vučedol Culture Museum was the most visited museum in Slavonia region, and the 7th most visited museum in Croatia.

In 2022 museum was the winner of the prestigious European "Destination of Sustainable Cultural Tourism" award

== Vučedol archaeological site ==
The Vučedol archaeological site is located on the right bank of the Danube River, four kilometres downriver from the city of Vukovar, at the spot where an intermittent watercourse in a loess Vukovar Plateau has cut a 25 metre high narrow steep valley that runs to the Danube river. Both sides along this steep pass make up the archaeological site, on the left is the Karasović Vineyard, and on the right is a large complex which includes the Streim Vineyard and the Streim Cornfield. Artificially separated from the pass, a little plateau known as Gradac, which through archeological excavations was confirmed as being the metallurgical and cultural centre of the site. It gives its name to the Vučedol culture that existed in Copper Age Europe.

The first investigations of the site dates back to 1897. The location was first inhabited around 6,000 B.C. and was inhabited intensively through the whole of prehistory. During the period between 3,350 – 2,300 B.C. it was a significant centre of human settlement in Europe. This period coincides with the early settlements of Troy (Troy I and II) and many similarities can be found between the archaeological material from Troy and Vučedol.

Archaeological excavations to date are able to precisely reconstruct the daily life and customs of four cultural phenomena which in that time swept through the sites of the Vučedol culture - Baden, Kostolac, Vučedol and Vinkovci. It was a turbulent time of the immigration of the first Indo-Europeans and their relationship with the natives, the blending of material cultures and religions. Each of the aforementioned settlements had its own characteristics, however the most detailed one able to be reconstructed is the Vučedol one, which also gave its name to this site.

== Bibliography ==
- Marić, Ivona (September 2016). "Pregled hrvatskih novih muzeja, novih stalnih postava i ostalih zanimljivih projekata iz svijeta muzeja u 2015" [Review of new Croatian museums, new permanent displays and other interesting projects from the museum world in 2015] (PDF). Informatica Museologica (in Croatian) (45–46): 24–34.
- The Vučedol archaeological site is located on the right bank of the Danube River. Both sides along the pass towards the Danube make up the archaeological site, on the left is the Karasović Vineyard.
- Vučedol Culture Museum was established in 2013 as a national museum.
