= Axel Siefer =

German actor (born 1951)

- Born: Axel Siefer; April 28, 1951 (age 74)
- Occupation: Actor
- Years active: 1971–present

Axel Siefer (born November 30, 1950) is a German actor.

== Biography ==
Axel Siefer attended the Acting School in Stuttgart, Southern Germany from 1969 to 1973. Since 1971 he has worked as stage-, TV- and film- actor and director. He became known to a wider audience in Germany thanks to his role as father of Daniela 'Danni' Lowinski in the TV series Danni Lowinski, which started in 2010.

Apart from his work as actor and director Axel Siefer was involved in the foundation and management of several theaters in Germany. Furthermore, he wrote a book with the title Als Schubert so alt war wie ich…, where he worked up his twenty-year-old stage experience in the role as contrabassist in Patrick Süskind's Der Kontrabaß.

== Filmography (selection) ==
- 1996: Gefährliche Freundin (TV movie)
- 1998: Der Fahnder (TV series, Appearance in one episode)
- 1999: The Princess and the Warrior (Der Krieger und die Kaiserin)
- 2001: Antonia – Zwischen Liebe und Macht (TV movie)
- 2002: Verbotene Liebe (TV soap opera, Appearance in four episodes from 1999 to 2002)
- 2003: The Tenth Summer (Der 10. Sommer)
- 2003: Und Tschüß, ihr Lieben (TV movie)
- 2003: SK Kölsch (TV series, Appearance in one episode)
- 2004: Stromberg (TV series, Appearance in one episode)
- 2006: Impossibly Yours (Der Liebeswunsch) (TV movie)
- 2006: Crime Scene (Tatort) (TV series)
- 2007: Stolberg (TV series, Appearance in 1 episode)
- 2008: The Invention of Curried Sausage (Die Entdeckung der Currywurst)
- 2009: Lindenstraße (TV soap opera, Appearance in five episodes in various roles)
- 2010: The Lost Father (TV movie)
- 2010: Alarm für Cobra 11 – Die Autobahnpolizei (TV series, Appearance in one episode)
- 2011: Neander-Jin: The Return of the Neanderthal Man
- 2011: Aschenputtel (TV movie)
- 2013: Trimbelten
- 2013: Danni Lowinski (TV series, Appearance in 52 episodes from 2010 to 2013)
