= Kastel Fortress =

Fortress in Banja Luka, Bosnia and Herzegovina

Coordinates: 44°46′00″N 17°11′27″E

- Banja Luka; Bosnia and Herzegovina
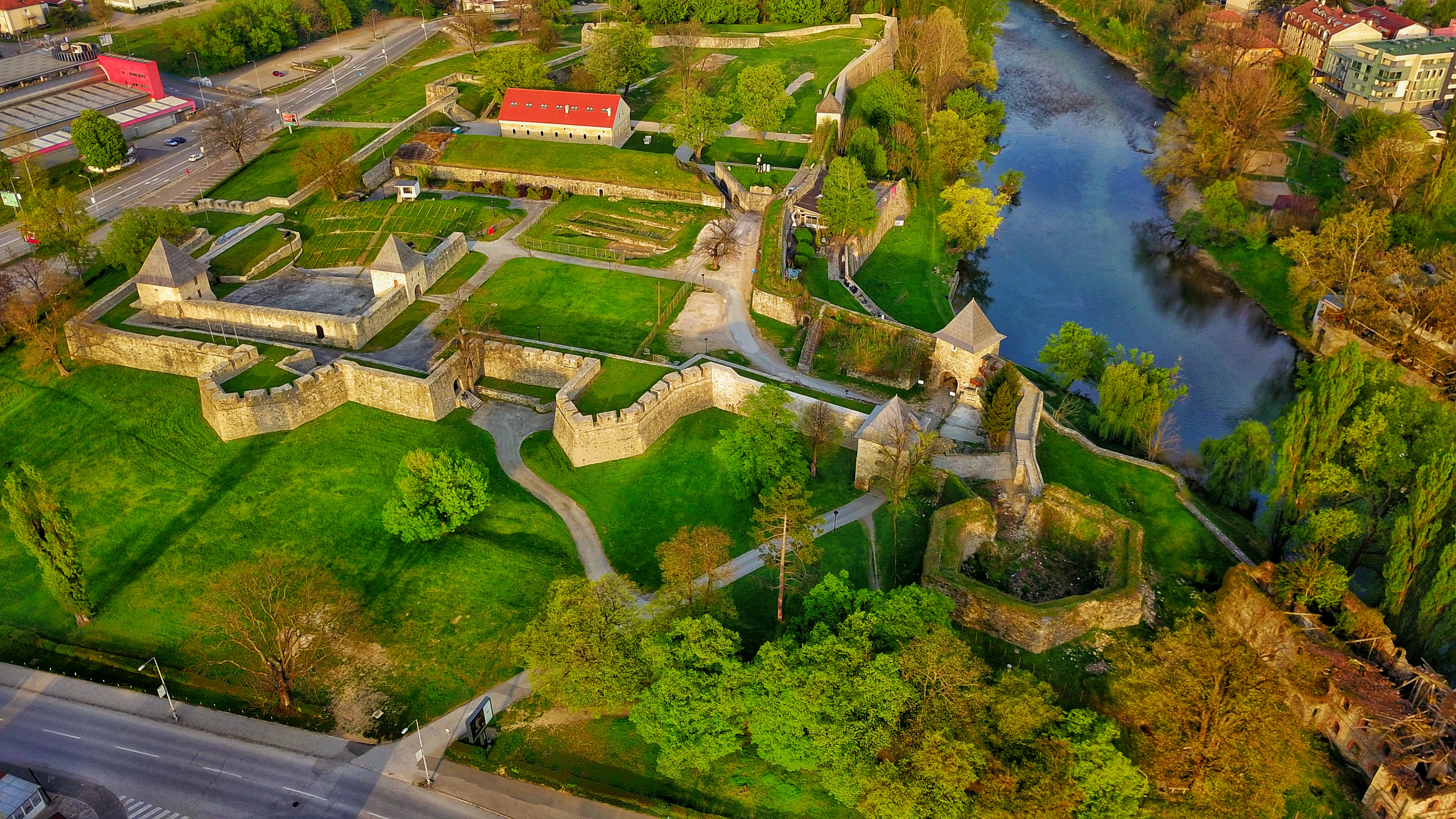

Site information
- Type: town-fortress
- Owner: The Government of Bosnia and Herzegovina
- Condition: Restored

Location

Site history
- Built: -
- Built by: (unknown)
- In use: Until -
- Materials: tufa, limestone in dry stone walling
- Battles/wars: -
- Events: -

Garrison information
- Occupants: Ottomans, Austria-Hungary
- Designations

KONS of Bosnia and Herzegovina
- Official name: Kastel fortress, the historic site
- Type: Category II monument
- Criteria: A, B, C iv.vi., D i.ii.iv, E ii.iii.v., F ii., G i.ii.iii.v.vi., H i.
- Designated: 4 Mаy 2004 (?th kons session; decision No. 05.2-02-45/04-5)
- Reference no.: 2474
- List of National Monuments of Bosnia and Herzegovina

The Kastel Fortress (Serbian Cyrillic: Тврђава Кастел, romanized: Tvrđava Kastel) is a fortress located in Banja Luka, Bosnia and Herzegovina. The fortress is medieval but is situated on the site of previous fortifications going back to Roman and even pre-Roman times. It was captured by the Ottoman Empire in 1527. The fortress is relatively well-preserved, and is one of Banja Luka's main attractions, situated on the left bank of the Vrbas river in the very center of town.

== History ==
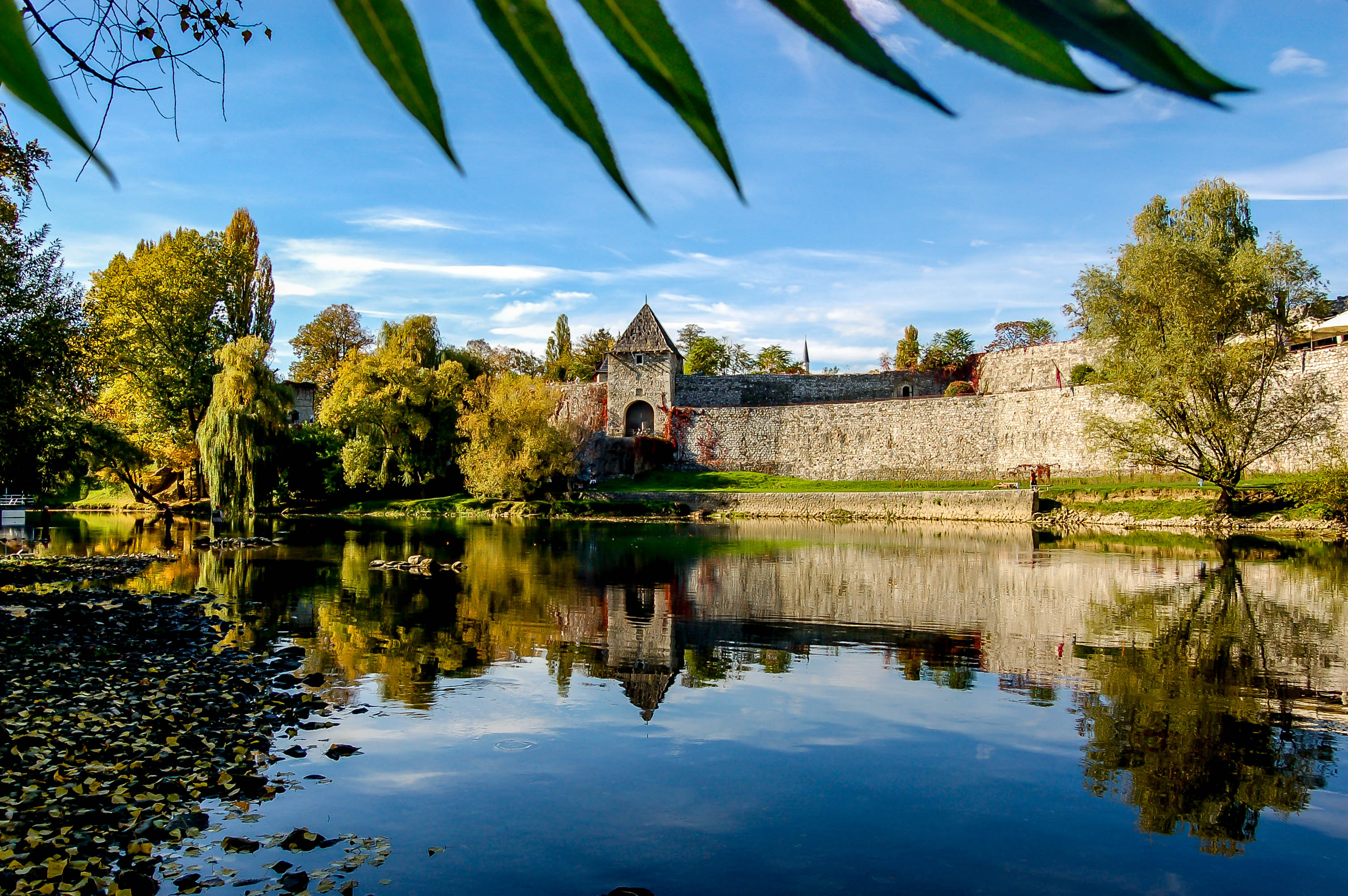
Kastel Fortress in 2013.

=== Prehistory ===
Flint tools were found on site, dating back to the Gravettian period, that is the youngest phase of Upper Paleolithic period, which lasted from XIX to the first quarter of the XII millennium BCE.

Fine, polished ceramics were found, dating back to the Neolithic period. It is made using the technique of reduction firing ceramics, giving it a burnt, black and grey finish.

It is presumed that the creation of the Neolithic settlement was a result of the pressure of the Vinča culture, more specifically the branch of the culture known as Sopotska culture.

The similarities of the Vinča and Starčevo culture display themselves in their techniques of fine polishing the outer surfaces of dishes and containers.

=== Eneolith ===
A settlement was discovered, dating back to the Eneolith period, containing ceramics of the baden culture group and a small number of ceramic fragments from the Vučedol culture. According to the analysis and the type of ornamentics, the locality of Kastel belonged to classic (deeper engravement of ornamentics) and late classic (shallow engravement of motifs) phase of the Vučedol culture. The characteristics of finer ceramics is that it is mostly decorated with white encrusting, which is a general characteristic of Vučedol ceramics, which was analyzed at Kastel. The ceramics were ornamented with the technique of deep engravement, with deep and shallow engravings, and the decorations were made with branding and a pulley wheel.

The archeologists have observed the connection between the appearance and the spread of metal and the usage of white-encrusted ornaments. That relation has a deeper meaning for Vučedol culture who spread the metallurgical production across Europe, with its own Mythical significance, both with direct and hidden meaning involved. The fact that the technique of white encrustation followed the spread of metallurgy implies the connection between the symbols of Vestal virgins as firekeepers and the ritual sacrifice of children before building melting ovens. The ritual itself was more mystical then religious, and innocent offerings of fetuses may be its most exalted symbol, meaning the sacrifice of purity and innocence. The appearance of white encrusting, in the mythical version, according to which Prometheus carried over the stolen flame to humans, has its own link with the plant by the name of Ferula Communis, which sprouts all across Mediterranean. The plant itself is filled with white and easily combustible core. According to the myth, Prometheus hid the flame into the plant and gifted it to humankind. Thus, the whiteness of encrusting may have some relation with fire and melting.

Flint knives and animal bones were found, apart from ceramics.

=== Antiquity period ===
On the basis of hodological examinations, ancient geographical maps (Tabula Peutingeriana i Itinerarium Antonini) and mostly accidental discoveries, it was established that ancient Roman settlement by the name of Castra existed here. In Castra, there was a station for travelers (mansio), military camp (castrum), and a civilian settlement next to the camp (canabae) and the beneficiary station (statio). It belonged to the territory of the province of Northern Pannonia, and it was settled by the Osseriates. Castra was situated on the line of communication which started in Salona (Solin), the political center of the Roman province of Dalmatia, all the way to the Servicius (Gradiška), and the port that existed on the river Sava in the province of Pannonia.

The excavations from 1980 to 1988 uncovered the walls, whose size and the process by which it was constructed clearly points us to late antiquity. The foundations of some other object from the period of later antiquity, whose purpose was not deduced. (Basilica, administrative building or complex of various contents are some of the guesses).

The investigations of the Locality of Hanište in 1985 and 1986, upon which the han (Ottoman multi purpose building) was built by Ferhad Pasha between 1579 and 1587 (destroyed in 1640), uncovered the remains of foundations of walls built from clay and local soft stone by the name of Lauša. Small ceramical, glass, iron and bone fragments were uncovered, along with some money and bricks. Everything was dated to a time period between III and IV century. It is presumed that Ferhad-Pasha's anglomeracy built itself upon the foundation of the building dating back to antiquity. There, between 1576 and 1587, 216 new objects were built.

=== Middle Ages ===
In the middle of the XVII century in Banja Luka, in the itinerary of Evlija Čelebija, and also some other travelers, two towns are mentioned. One in Upper Šeher, and the other in Lower Šeher (the location of Castel nowadays).

The name "Banja Luka" is first mentioned in 1494 in one document issued by the Hungarian king Ladislav II Jagelović. Banja Luka was then a part of the Jajačka banovina, but it is unclear where the Banja Luka fort was located. According to early Ottoman documents, the document speaks of a fort in Upper Šeher, mentioned by multitudes of authors by the name of Vrbaški city. In the war between the Habsburg and Ottoman Empire (1683–1699), Austrian troops, under the command of count Ludwig of Baden, shortly occupied Banja Luka on August 1688. After that event, there was no more mention of a fort in Upper Šeher.

=== Ottoman Empire ===
In 1528, the entire territory of Jajačka banovina, from Jajce to the river Sava, fell to the Ottoman rule. Banja Luka becomes the capital of Bosnian Sandžak-beg in 1554. When the Bosnian Pashaluk was founded in 1580, its capital was in Banja Luka. The first Beglerbeg (ruler) was Gazi Ferhad Pasha Sokolović, who initiated substantial building activity in the Lower Šeher, today's center of the city, where he built 216 objects. Among them, an arsenal was built, before 1587. The arsenal was turned into a fortress during the reign of Mehmed III (1595–1603), and was called the New Fort. According to tradition, a Mosque was built in the fort, and it was built in the name of the aforementioned Sultan.

During the restoration of Köprülüzade Numan Pasha in 1712–1714, the fort got its final dimensions. It was expanded according to principles of Voban's system, and it was also repaired in 1734–1738 after a battle. According to an anonymous document, presumably written in 1785, there were fifty cannons in the fort. The last restoration of the fort happened in 1868. During the occupation of Austria-Hungary, one battalion was stationed in the fort. After world war II and until 1959, the Kastel fortress was used for military purposes. During the 1960s and afterwards, Kastel was used for a wide variety of purposes.

=== Description ===
Kastel locality has the area of 26,610 m^{2} (286,400 sq ft) inside the walls of the fortress and 21,390 m^{2} (230,200 sq ft) outside the walls. The walls are barely above ground. Kastel is an artillery fort situated on the plains and it has a polygonal foundation in the shape of an extended trapezoid. In the interior of the fort there are 7 small cannon fortifications. Their walls are about 2.5 meters in width.

From the inners side of the walls, three arsenals are attached, and the walls there are 6.5 meters in width. The fort was built out of rectangular chiseled stone, set upon each other in variety of ways and tied together with mortar. Alongside the walls, there are three tucked in rectangular towers.

A sconce was a part of the defensive system of the fort. It was about 20–30 meters wide and it surrounded Kastel from all sides, except alongside Vrbas, making it almost seem like the fort was on an island. Today, the sconce is buried. Alongside the walls, there used to be secret underground passages.

The main casemate of the fort was 80 meters long and 15 meters wide.

On the sandy beach of Vrbas, two well hidden and masked wells were dug up. River water used to flow in them, filtered through layers of sand. Masked steps led to the "big well" and to get to the "small well", one would use doors in the wall.

The historical area- Kastel Fortress was declared a national monument of Bosnia and Herzegovina.

== Literature ==
- Ivo Bojanovski, Academy of arts and science of Bosnia and Herzegovina, 1988 - Bosnia and Herzegovina in antiquity
- Esad Pašalić, Posebna izdanja Zemaljskog muzeja u Sarajevu, Sarajevo, 1960. – ANTIČKA NASELJA I KOMUNIKACIJE U BOSNI I HERCEGOVINI
- Ljiljana Ševo, Opština Banja Luka, Zavod za zaštitu spomenika kulture i prirode Banja Luka, Banja Luka, 1996., 13-79 – Urban development of Banja Luka
- Hazim Šabanović, II izdanje, Svjetlost, Sarajevo, 1982. –BOSNIAN PASHALUK, CREATION AND ADMINISTRATIVE DIVIDE
- Hamdija Kreševljaković, Sarajevo: Svijetlost, 1980, -KAPETANIJE U BiH
- Hamdija Kreševljaković, Izabrana djela, II, Sarajevo 1991 -Towns in Bosnia and Herzegovina

== See also ==
- List of fortifications in Bosnia and Herzegovina
- Roman heritage in Serbia
