= Trimbelten =

- Directed by: Sebastian Kühn
- Written by: Sebastian Kühn
- Starring: Axel Siefer, Johanna Reinders, Stefan Lampadius
- Cinematography: Eugen Hecht
- Edited by: Sebastian Kuehn, Nils Schomers
- Music by: Moritz Lassmann
- Release date: February 2, 2013 (Jaipur International Film Festival)
- Running time: 15 minutes
- Country: Germany
- Language: German (with English subtitles)

Trimbelten is a 2013 German short drama / thriller film, directed by German film director Sebastian Kühn. The film participated in various international film festivals.

== Plot ==
After years in his self-imposed exile, the broken ex-cop Trimbelten hears, that Karl Münch, the person who is responsible for his daughter's death, was released from jail. Trimbelten embarks on his mission to take revenge, but on his way he bumps into the rebellious girl Stina. He picks up the hitchhiker. Trimbelten's grief and obsession with revenge is momentarily relieved by Stina's helpless vulnerability.

== Cast ==
- Axel Siefer as Trimbelten
- Johanna Reinders as Stina
- Stefan Lampadius as Karl Münch

== Awards ==
- 2013: Nominated for Festival Award in the category Best Student Film at the Crossroads Film Festival in Mississippi.
- 2013: Nominated for Best Student Film in the George Sidney independent film competition at the San Luis Obispo International Film Festival in San Luis Obispo, California.
