= Thomas, Thomas =

- Directed by: Corinna Liedtke
- Written by: Corinna Liedtke, Peter Schüttemeyer
- Produced by: Melanie Andernach
- Starring: Stefan Lampadius
- Cinematography: Peter Schüttemeyer
- Edited by: Monika Pirch
- Music by: Roland Meyer de Voltaire, Christoph Schneider
- Release dates: November 11, 2010 (Kassel Documentary Film and Video Festival)
- Running time: 14 minutes
- Country: Germany
- Language: German

Thomas, Thomas is a 2010 German short mockumentary film, directed by German film director Corinna Liedtke. The film participated in several German and European film festivals and won a few prizes.

== Plot ==
Wolfgang Weber is a bit unworldly archivist of the city of Castrop-Rauxel. He makes an astonishing discovery while receiving treatment at Thomas Vallomtharayil's Ayurvedic clinic. 150 years earlier, another Thomas was at work where the clinic stands today: the Irish mining pioneer and Ruhr legend Thomas Mulvany. This film accompanies the archivist in a documentary style through his research into the astounding parallels between the lives of the two Thomas’, which leads Wolfgang Weber to a striking conclusion: Thomas Vallomtharayil is the reincarnation of Thomas Mulvany.

== Awards ==
- 2010: Special mention at the 27th Kassel Documentary Film and Video Festival in Kassel, Germany
- 2011: Team Award at the German film festival 24th Stuttgarter Filmwinter

== Background ==
At first Thomas, Thomas was only an episode of the German TV movie Zeche is nich – Sieben Blicke auf das Ruhrgebiet 2010, which was produced in the context of Ruhr.2010. The film tells the fictional and non-fictional stories of young filmmakers of their home, the Ruhr Area. Later Thomas, Thomas and other episodes of this TV movie were released as self-contained films.

== Miscellaneous ==
- In Wolfgang Weber - Ein neuer Fall (Wolfgang Weber - A new case) the archivist examines the market place of Castrop-Rauxel, where curiously a lot of accidents happen.
- The teaser Wolfgang Weber - Neue Fälle aus Castrop-Rauxel (Wolfgang Weber - New Cases from Castrop-Rauxel) shows new cases of Wolfgang Weber.
