= Vučedol culture =

Archaeological culture

Coordinates: 45°21′N 19°00′E

- Alternative names: Vučedol-zok, Vučedol-mako
- Geographical range: North-west Balkans, Pannonian Plain
- Period: Chalcolithic, Bronze Age
- Dates: c. 3000 BCE – 2200 BCE
- Type site: Vučedol
- Major sites: Vučedol, Vinkovci, Sarvaš, Erdut, Opatovac, Vukovar-Syrmia County, Lovas, Croatia, Gomolava, Belegiš, Zók, Velika Barna, Veliko Trojstvo, Makó, Kiszombor, Szeged, Csongrád, Budapest, Üllő, Vecsés
- Preceded by: Baden culture, Hvar culture, Coțofeni culture, Yamnaya culture
- Followed by: Bell Beaker culture, Nagyrév culture, Cetina culture, Somogyvár-Vinkovci culture, Vatin culture, Encrusted Pottery culture

The Vučedol culture (Croatian: Vučedolska kultura) flourished between 3000 and 2200 BC (the Chalcolithic period of earliest copper-smithing and arsenical bronze-smithing), centered in Syrmia and eastern Slavonia on the right bank of the Danube river, but possibly spreading throughout the Pannonian plain and western Balkans and southward. It was thus contemporary with the Sumer period in Mesopotamia, the Early Dynastic period in Egypt and the earliest settlements of Troy (Troy I and II). Archaeogenetics link the culture from Yamnaya migrations directly from the steppes that mixed with Neolithic people. The need for copper resulted in the expansion of the Vučedol Culture from its homeland of Slavonia into the broader region of central and southeastern Europe. The Vučedol culture is also known as the 'Zok culture' in Hungary, with regional variants including the 'Mako culture' and 'Nyirseg culture', and as the 'Laibach-Ljubljana culture' In the eastern Alpine area.

== Location ==
Following the Baden culture, another wave of possible Indo-European speakers came to the banks of the Danube. One of the major places they occupied is present-day Vučedol, located six kilometers downstream from the town of Vukovar, Croatia. It is estimated that the site had once been home to about 3,000 inhabitants, making it one of the largest and most important European centers of its time. According to Bogdan Brukner, proto-Illyrians descended from this wave of Indo-European settlers.

The early stages of the culture occupied locations not far from mountain ranges, where copper deposits were located, because of their main invention: making tools from arsenical copper in series reusing double, two-part moulds.

The Vučedol culture at its peak completely or partially covered 14 of today's European countries – the Czech Republic, Slovakia, Austria, Hungary, Romania, Slovenia, Italy, Croatia, Bosnia and Herzegovina, Serbia, Montenegro, Kosovo, Albania and one settlement has even been registered in Eastern Greece.

== Cultural phases ==
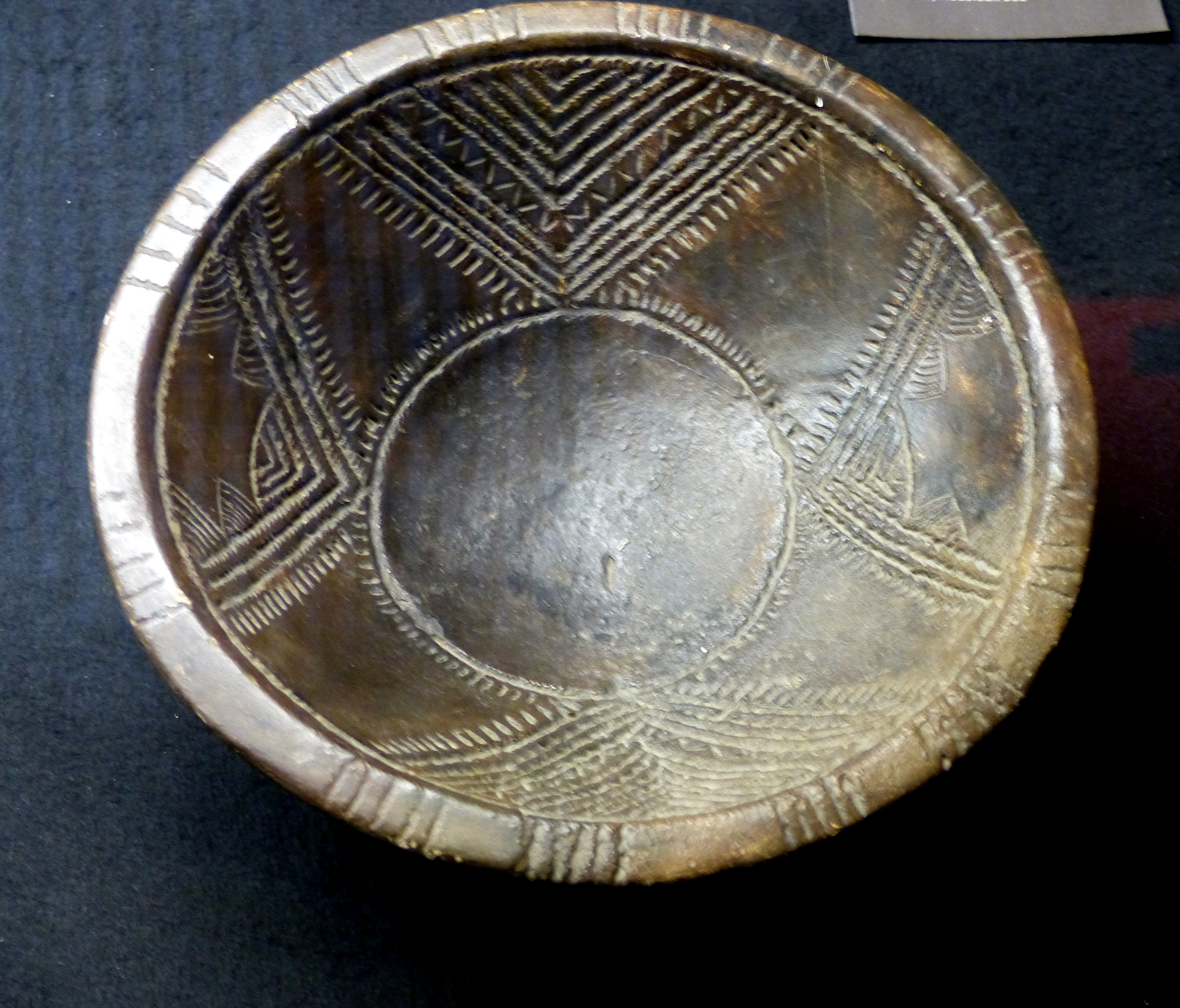
Ceramic dish from Austria

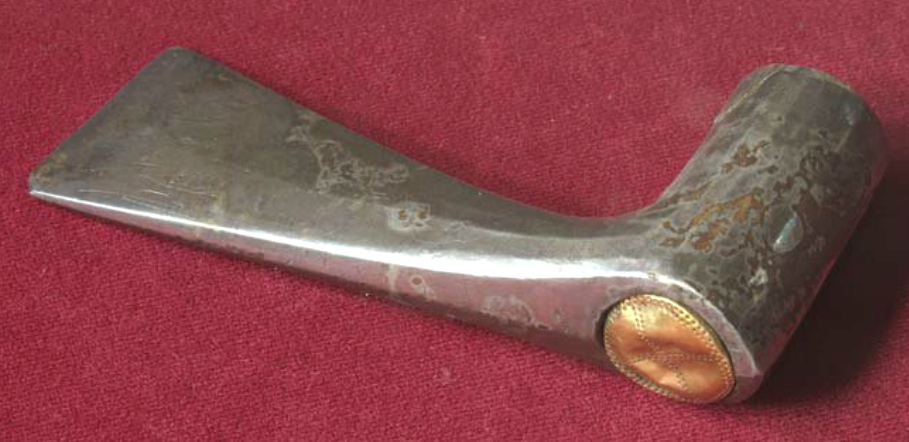
Silver and gold axe from the Mala Gruda tumulus, Montenegro, c. 2500 BC. A gold dagger and gold rings were also found in the tumulus.

The Vučedol culture developed from two older eneolithic cultures: the Baden culture, mainly in the Pannonian plain, and the Kostolac culture in northern Serbia and western Romania, so the primary region of Vučedol development is eastern Croatia and the Syrmia region.

The archaeological stratigraphy of the Vučedol culture can be divided into four phases:

- Preclassic period A
- Early classic period B1
- Classic period B2
- Period of expansion with regional types, C:
  - East Croatian (Slavonian-Syrmian type)
  - West Bosnian (Hrustovac type)
  - South Bosnian (Debelo Brdo type)
  - North Serbian (Đurđevačka Glavica type)
  - Slovenian (Ljubljana Marsh type)
  - Transdanubian (Pannonian Hungarian type)
  - East Austrian-Czech type

The Vučedol culture is the final eneolithic culture of the region, displaying characteristically common use of the war axe in its "Banniabik" form. Cult objects suggest the practice of new cults very different from the Neolithic Magna Mater conception: cult of the Deer, womb-shaped solar motives, figures of women in clothes without sexual or fertility decoration, symbols of double axe. In pottery, new forms and a new rich decoration, are characterized by the spectacular find, the Vučedol dove. The Vučedol culture exploited native copper ores on a massive scale. The settlement sites destroyed earlier eneolithic settlements, and new Vučedol settlements also developed in regions where none previously existed.

The rise of a dominant hunter-warrior class is a preview of the changes that will be characteristic for the east and middle European early Bronze Age.

== Social organization ==
Digital reconstruction of the Vučedol settlement, Croatia. Vučedol Culture Museum

Compared to earlier and contemporary cultures the Vučedol culture exploited a diversity in food sources: the Vučedol people were hunters, fishermen and agrarians, with some strong indications that they cultivated certain domesticated animals. Thus the culture was more resilient to times of want.

The community chief was the shaman-smith, possessing the arcane knowledge of avoiding poisonous arsenic gas which is connected to the technology of coppersmithing as well as understanding the year cycle. Still, the whole life of shaman-smith could not pass without biological consequences of chronic arsenic exposure: slow loss of body movement coordination, and at the same time, stronger sexual potency. "That is why", according to Aleksandar Durman, "all eneolithic, or later gods of metallurgy are identified with fertility, and also why all gods in almost all early cultures – limp".

It was a society of deep social changes and stratification that led to the birth of tribal and military aristocracy. Also, Vučedol people had enough time to express their spiritual view of the world.

== Ceramics ==
In modern times, Vučedol ceramics have become famous worldwide. A very characteristic bi-conical shape and typical ornaments evolved, in many cases with typical "handles" which were almost non-functional, but were key to understanding ornaments that had symbolic meanings, representing ideas such as "horizon", "mountains", "sky", "underworld", "sun", "constellation of Orion", "Venus", et cetera.

=== The Vučedol dove ===
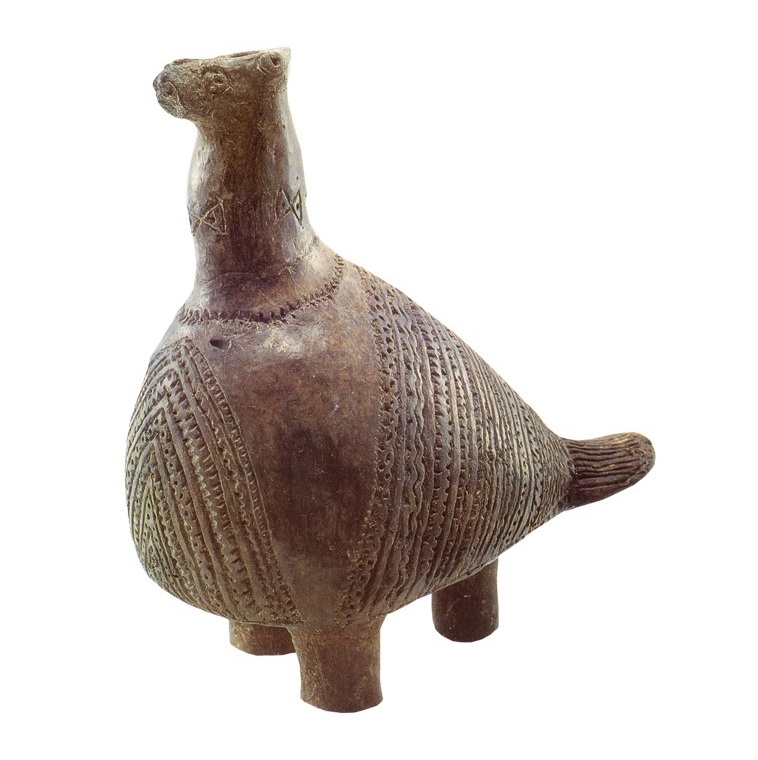
Vučedol Dove, the distinctive bird-shaped pot of the Vučedol culture, Croatia, c. 2600 BC

One of the most famous pieces of Vučedol is the ritual vessel made between 2800 and 2500 BCE, called by the speculative attribution of M. Seper, who found it in 1938, the "Vučedol Dove" (vučedolska golubica). The latest interpretation, however, is that the vessel is in the shape of the male partridge, a symbol of fertility, whose limping defensive behavior against attack by predators on a partridge nest on the ground linked it to the limping shaman-smith, according to the recent interpretation by Aleksandar Durman of Zagreb. The figure is a remarkable example of artistic creation and religious symbolism associated with a cult of the Great Mother. The "Vučedol Dove" is a 19,5 cm high ritual vessel made from baked clay. Three symbols of double axes and a necklace were incised on its neck with lines covering its wings and chest, and an unusual crest on the back of the head. If the shape of the crest and carefully delineated wings and chest, prove the figure to be the domesticated dove, then it was being raised in Europe 4,500 years ago, much earlier than we commonly think. The "Vučedol Dove" is the oldest dove figure found in Europe so far.

The ritual vessel was depicted on the reverse of the Croatian 20 kuna banknote, issued in 1993 and 2001.

=== Astral calendar ===
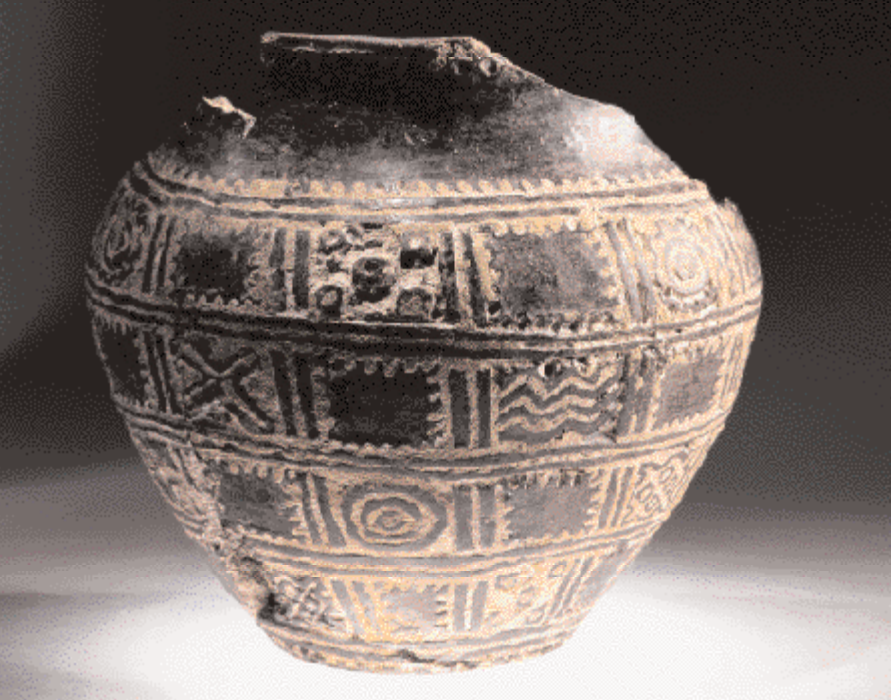
Vučedol vase with calendar signs, c. 2600 BC

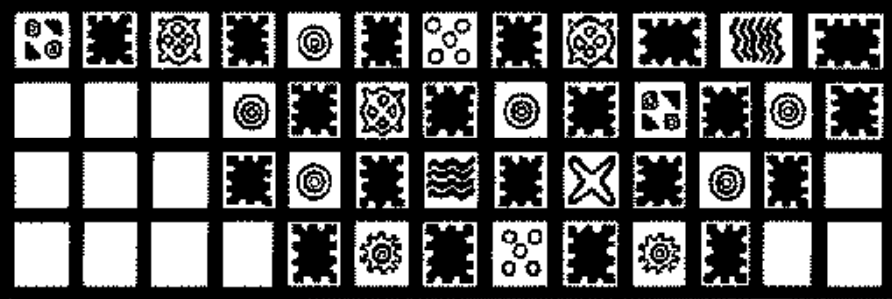
Calendar signs on the Vučedol vase

Among the most famous pieces is a piece of ceramics dated to 2600 BC with an astral calendar, the first one found in Europe that shows the year starting at the dusk of the first day of spring.

It is based on an Orion cycle, shown by precise sequence of constellations on a vessel found in an Eneolithic mound in the very center of the modern town of Vinkovci. The climatic conditions in that latitude bring about four yearly seasons. (Note: The Blytt-Sernander post-glacial climate phase in question is the Subboreal.) The simple explanation of the Vučedol Calendar is that each of the four lateral bands on the vessel represent the four seasons, starting with spring on the top. Each band is divided into twelve boxes, making up 12 "weeks" for each season. Each of the little boxes contains an ideogram of celestial objects that lie at a certain point on the horizon right after twilight. The place of reference on the horizon is the point at which (in those days) the Orion's Belt disappeared from view at the end of winter, which meant the beginning of a new year. The pictographs in the boxes represent: Orion, the Sun, Cassiopeia, Cygnus, Gemini, Pegasus, and the Pleiades. If the box is empty, it means there was nothing visible at the reference point during the corresponding time. (Note: About the archaeoastronomy in the wider area read also Kokino and Miholjanec.)

== Lifestyle and religion ==
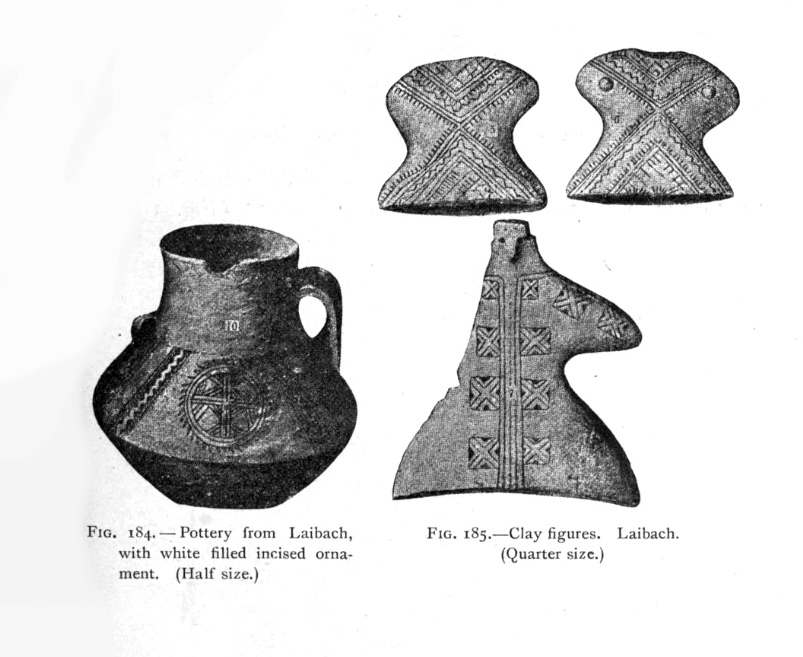
Pottery and ceramic figurines showing clothing decoration

People of the Vučedol culture lived in thatched wattle-and-daub houses. Vučedol people lived on hilltop sites surrounded with palisades. Houses were half buried, mostly square or circular in plan with floors of burned clay; the shapes were also combined in mushroom shapes; there were circular fireplaces.

The houses at the Vučedol site were also places of birth and burial. A number of human skeletons were found in the pits that once served as food storage pits. Their bodies were placed in a ritual way, with some possible indications of human sacrifice. Also, marks on the foreheads of skulls were found that could be attributed to some kind of initiation in early childhood by a drop of molten copper.

== Trade with other cultures ==
Some researchers of the Vučedol culture have claimed that there was regular trade between the territory of the Vučedol culture and the Helladic culture to the south.

Cultural elements found of the B2 phase of the Vučedol culture appear to have originated in the first phase of the middle Bronze Age of the Helladic culture of mainland Greece.

== Origin ==
The excavated settlement of Vučedol provides a base for the stratigraphic structure of the whole culture.

No final conclusions about the linguistic character of Vučedol can be made, such as the inference that its people were linguistically Indo-European, or to what extent they mixed with native European populations, in regions of the eastern Adriatic coast, Dalmatia and Herzegovina with some parts of Bosnia as well.

=== Archaeogenetics ===
A February 2018 study published in Nature included an analysis of three individuals ascribed to the Vučedol culture. One male carried haplogroup R1b-z2103 and T2e, while the other carried G2a2a1a2a and T2c2. The female carried U4a. In a three-way admixture model, first male approximately had 58% Early European Farmers, 42% Western Steppe Herders and 0% Western Hunter-Gatherer-related ancestry, second male 93% EEF, 4% WSH and 3% WHG while female 37% EEF, 54% WSH and 10% WHG. According to Lazaridis, R1b-Z2103 is linked to the Yamnaya migration from the steppes.

== Gallery ==
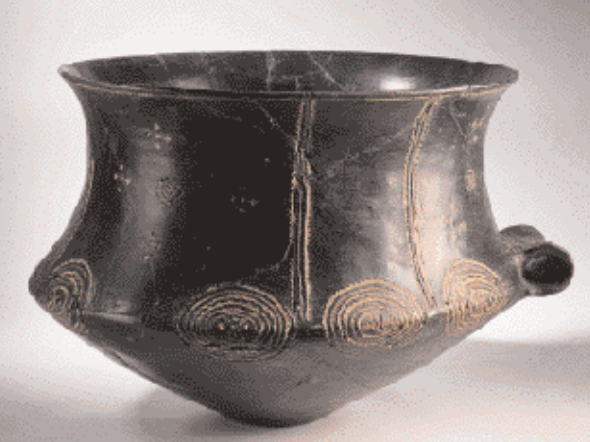

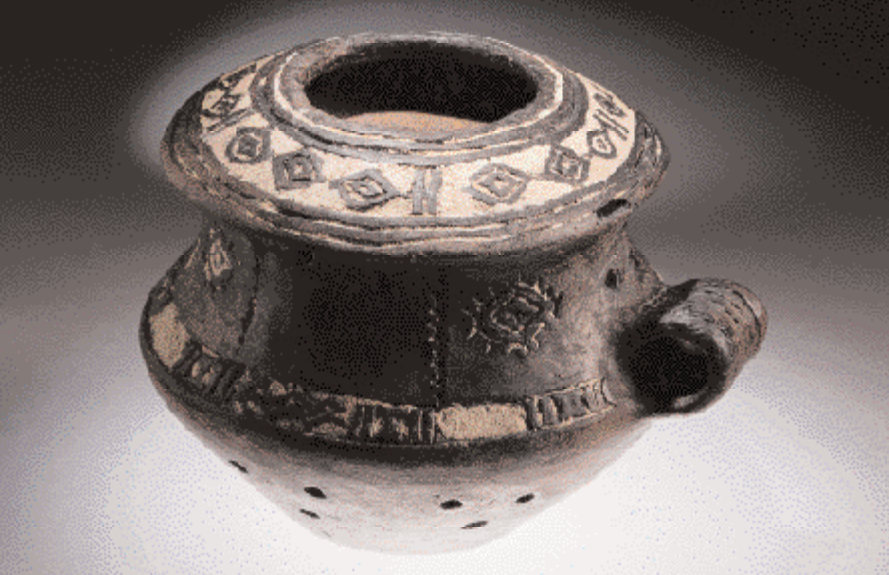

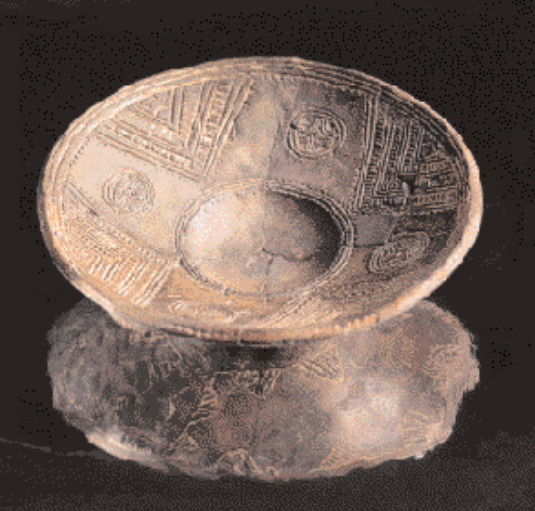

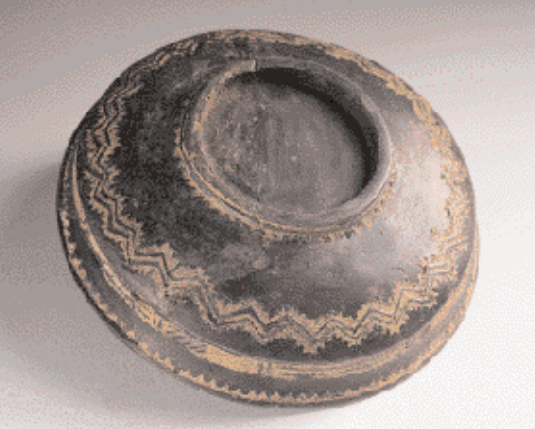

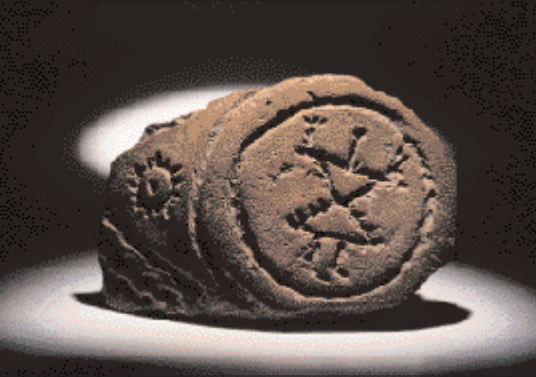

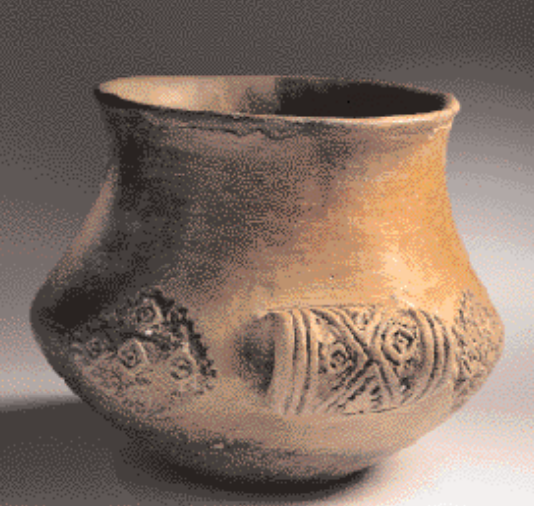

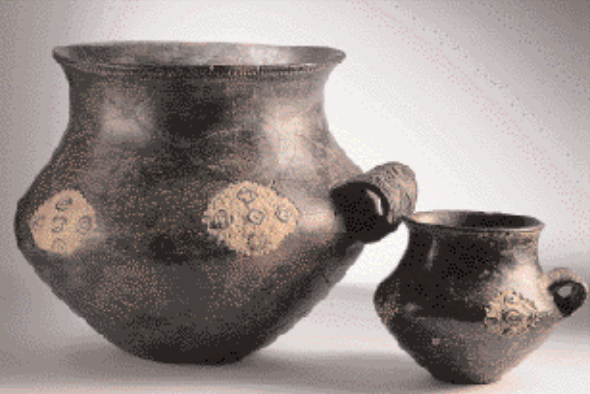

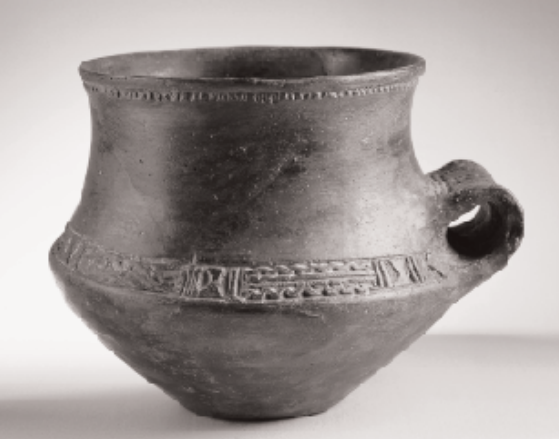

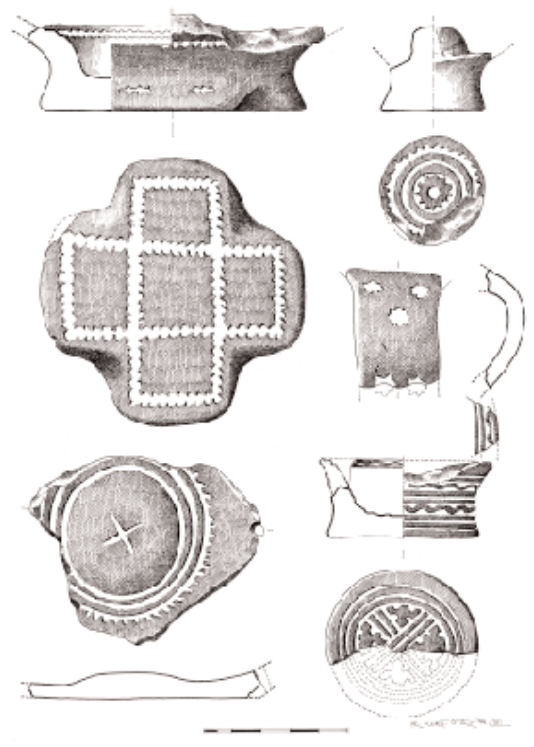

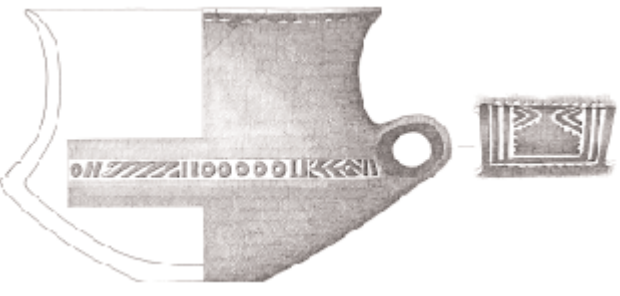

=== Finds from Montenegrin tumuli ===
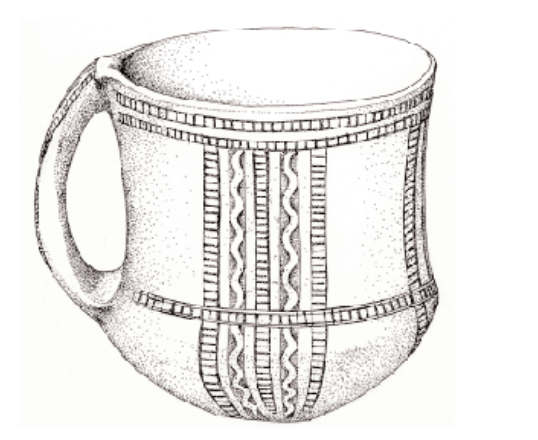
Ceramic cup from the Mala Gruda tumulus

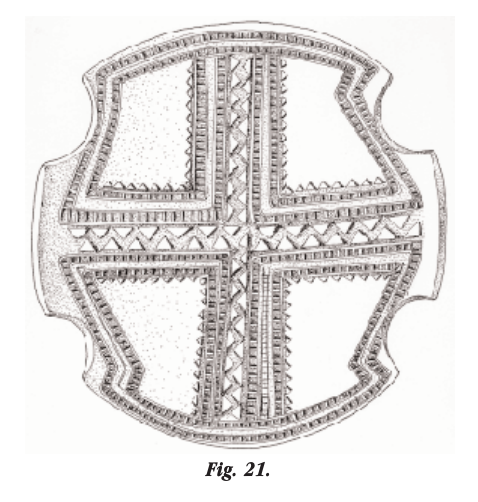
Ceramic vessel from the Mala Gruda tumulus

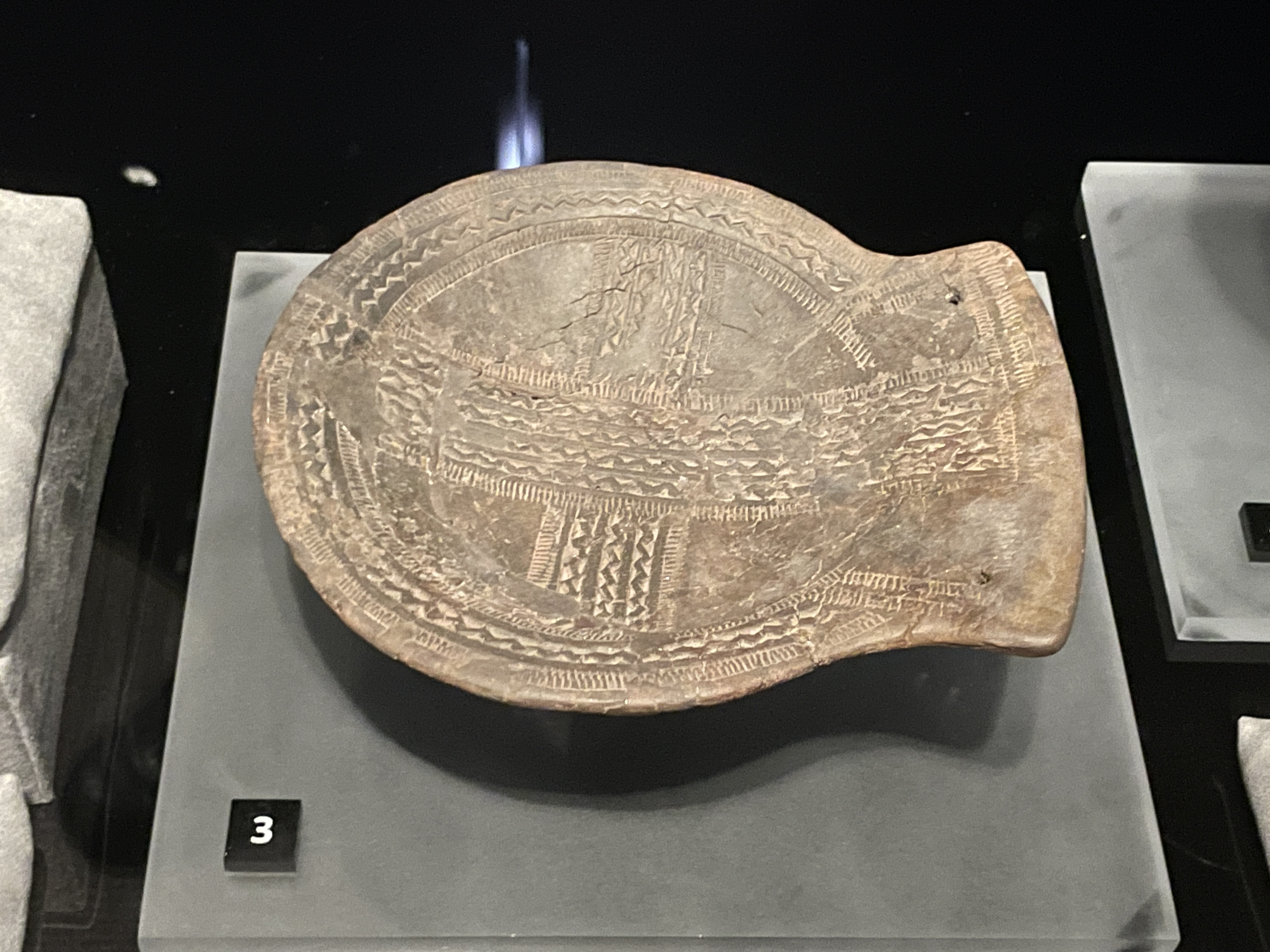
Ceramic dish from the Bojevica Gruda tumulus

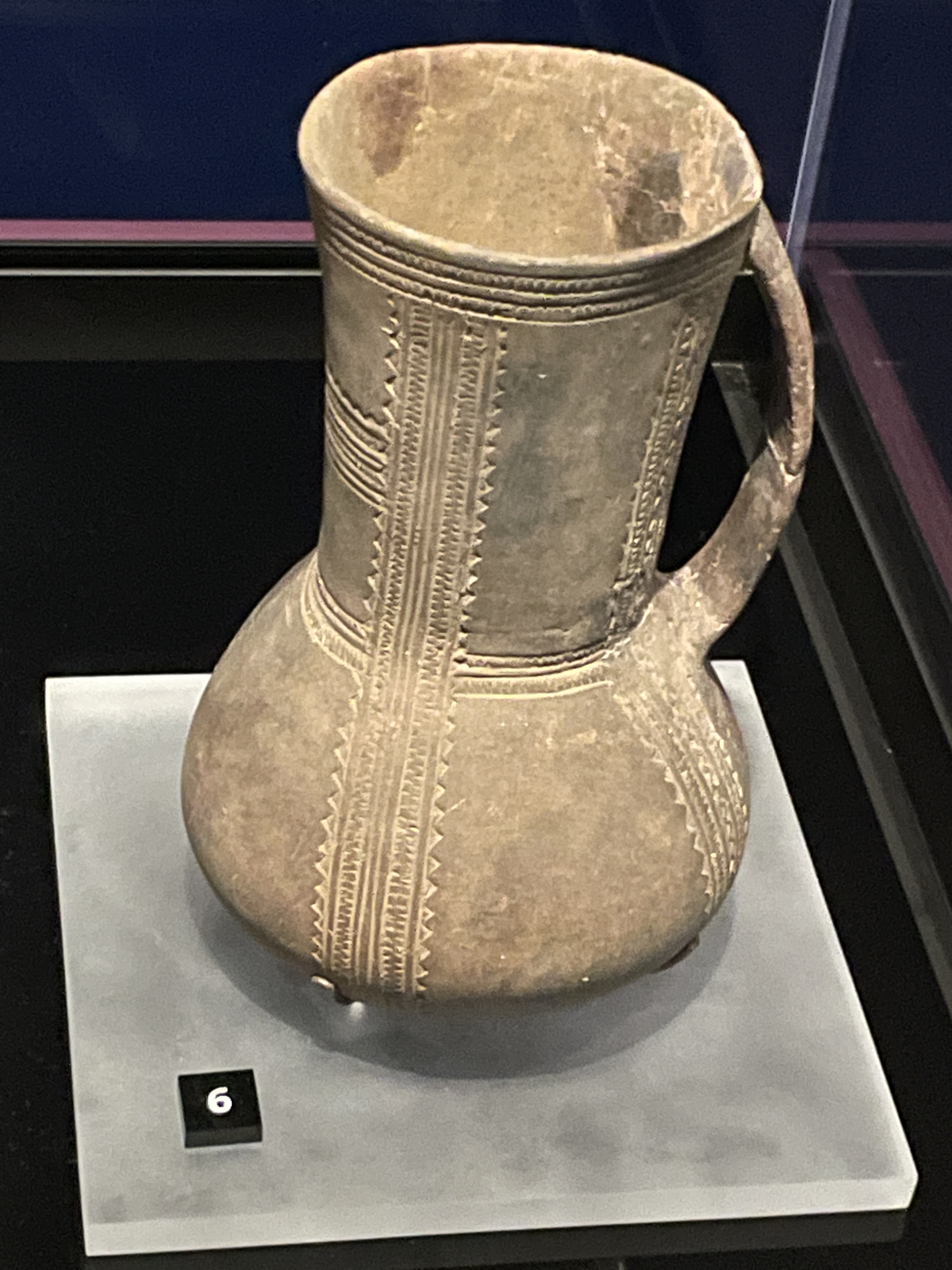
Ceramic jug from the Bojevica Gruda tumulus

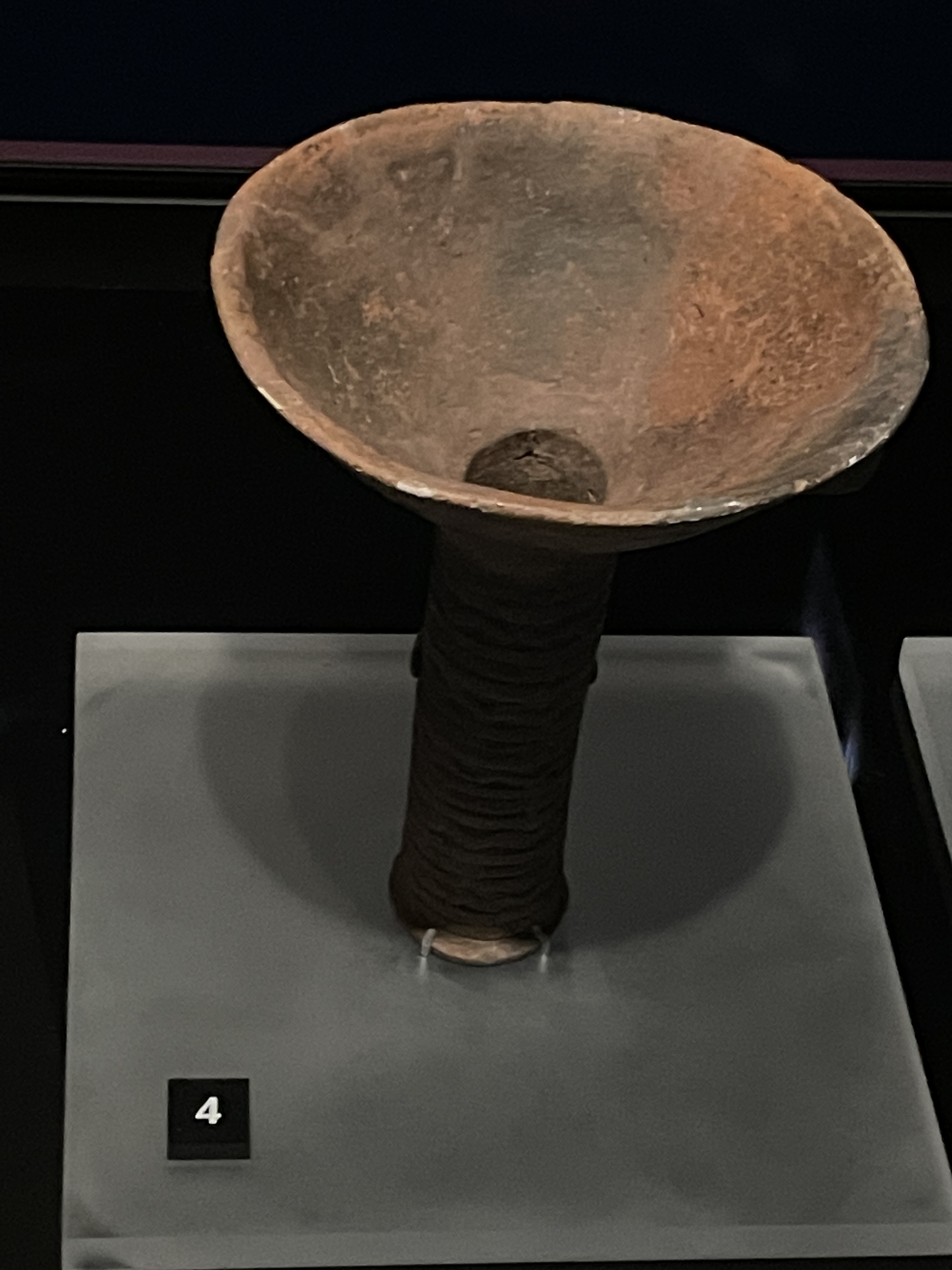
Ceramic funnel from the Bojevica Gruda tumulus

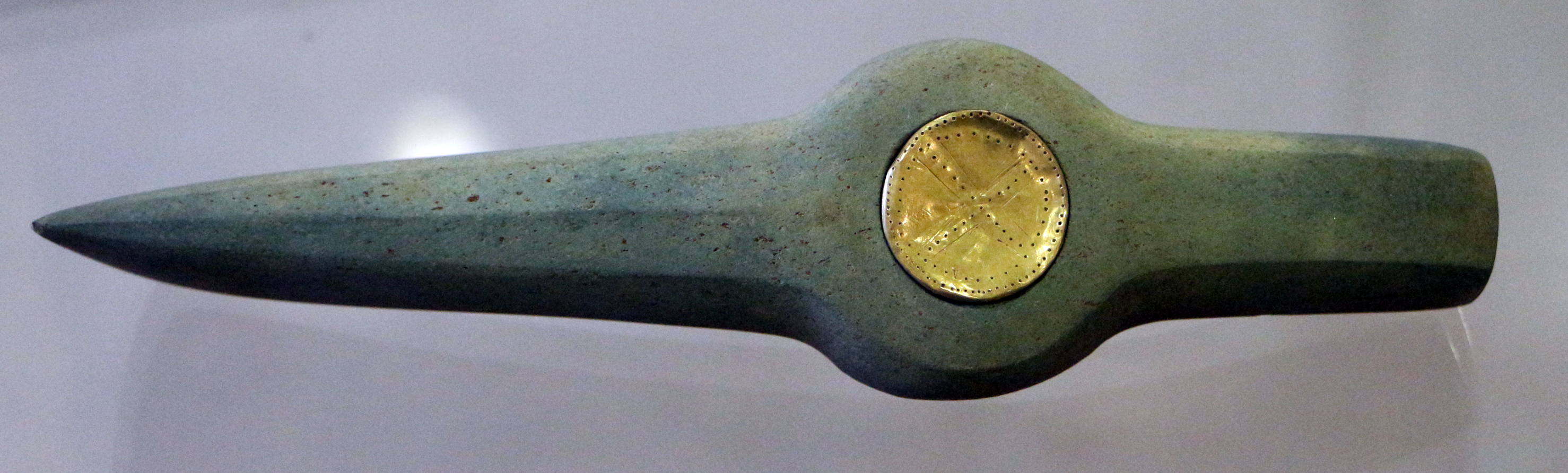
Green stone axe with gold decoration, Boljevića Gruda tumulus, Montenegro.

== See also ==
- Vučedol Culture Museum
- Apennine culture

== Sources ==
- Mathieson, Iain (21 February 2018). "The Genomic History of Southeastern Europe". Nature. 555 (7695). Nature Research: 197–203. Bibcode:2018Natur.555..197M. doi:10.1038/nature25778. PMC 6091220. PMID 29466330.
- Durman, Aleksandar; Obelić, Bogomil (1989). "Radiocarbon dating of the Vucedol culture complex". Radiocarbon. 3 (3): 1003. Bibcode:1989Radcb..31.1003D. doi:10.1017/S0033822200012649. S2CID 131669078.
