= Danni Lowinski =

German legal drama comedy series

- Genre: Legal drama Dramedy
- Created by: Marc Terjung; Benedikt Gollhardt
- Starring: Annette Frier; Nadja Becker; Elyas M’Barek; Oliver Fleischer; Jan Sosniok; Axel Siefer
- Music by: Marco Meister; Hans Hafner; Ilja Coric; Kian Djalili
- Opening theme: Kate Nash – Mouthwash
- Country of origin: Germany
- Original language: German
- No. of seasons: 5
- No. of episodes: 65

Production
- Production location: Cologne
- Running time: 45 minutes
- Production companies: Phoenix Film (2013-2013); UFA Fiction (2013-present)

Original release
- Network: Sat.1
- Release: 12 April 2010 – 15 September 2014

Related
- Der letzte Bulle; Pastewka

Danni Lowinski is a German legal dramedy that premiered on Sat.1 on April 12, 2010, featuring Annette Frier as the eponymous character. The show was created by Marc Terjung, who also created the legal dramedy Edel & Starck, and Benedikt Gollhardt. On May 19, 2010, Sat.1 renewed the show for a second season, which premiered on March 14, 2011. A third season was ordered in April 2011, set to premiere on February 6, 2012. All seasons are consisting of thirteen episodes each.

The fourth season aired from 21 January to 22 April 2013. On 9 April 2013 it was announced that Danni Lowinski was renewed for a fifth season.

== Plot ==
Daniela "Danni" Lowinski (Annette Frier) is a trained hairdresser who received her qualification for college (in Germany called Abitur) doing evening classes and then managed to major in law successfully. After graduating, she wants to work as lawyer but no lawyer's office is willing to employ her. In sheer desperation she has the idea to lease space in a mall where a simple table and two chairs form a small helpdesk. The helpdesk offers people the opportunity to have Danni deal with their legal matters for just one Euro per minute. Of course this leads to Danni attracting rather unusual clients, whose problems she solves in an equally unusual manner.

In each season she is assisted by her best friend and barista Bea Flohe (Nadja Becker) as well as people from adjacent stores in the mall. In her private life, Danni has to deal with her father Kurt (Axel Siefer), whom she lives with.

In the first season her friends from the adjacent stores are Persian locksmith Rasoul (Elyas M’Barek) and Nils (Oliver Fleischer), a massage therapist, as well as Dr. Oliver Schmidt (Jan Sosniok), a fellow attorney who works in a lawyer's office located in the mall. She starts a relationship with Oliver with whom she breaks up in the final episode about a professional problem.

In the second season Hannes Stüsser takes over the locksmith business and the mall has a new security guard Sven Nowak. She starts a relationship with Sven and she finds out that there is a homicide case against him from his former job in the police where she asks access to records at the state attorney. She has mixed feelings about Oliver and Sven and both of them press her to make a choice in the final episode.

In the third season it is revealed that Sven had quit, now being on a job in Leverkusen. He is replaced by Svenja Müller. Nils runs a junk shop now and it is later revealed that Hannes has begun law studies. One thread follows Bea's relationship - in the beginning a loose triangle with Nils and Hannes and later Dustin which however turns out to be a drug dealer facing a jail sentence. The other thread is about Oliver who initiates a formal contract sending down a couple of cases - that includes a big lawsuit against a pharmaceutical that makes for key scenes in the final episode.

== Cast ==
- Annette Frier as Danni Lowinski, attorney at law
- Nadja Becker as Bea Flohe, Danni's best friend
- Elyas M’Barek as Rasoul Abbassi, locksmith (season 1)
- Tino Mewes as Hannes Stüsser, locksmith (seasons 2-4)
- Oliver Fleischer as Nils Polgar
- Jan Sosniok as Dr. Oliver Schmidt, attorney at law
- Axel Siefer as Kurt Lowinski, Danni's father
- Sebastian Bezzel as Sven Nowak, mall security (seasons 2-3)
- Sabine Orléans as Svenja Müller, co-worker of Sven (season 3)
- Andreas Guenther as Josh, salesman and love interest of Danni (season 3)

== Production ==
Danni Lowinski is produced by Berlin-based producer Phoenix Film. The show was created by Marc Terjung and Benedikt Gollhardt, who also created Edel & Starck (2002–2005), another successful Sat.1 Dramedy.

Danni Lowinski is distributed internationally by SevenOne International.

== Reception ==
Danni Lowinski turned out to be a hit dramedy, allowing Sat.1 to achieve significant ratings with the target audience and to win the title of highest-rated show on 5 July 2010. Shortly after the first month of broadcasting, Danni Lowinski was renewed for its second season.

In August 2010 it was announced that Danni Lowinski was nominated for the Deutscher Comedypreis 2010 ("German Comedy Award 2010") alongside Pastewka and Stromberg. On 9 October 2010, Danni Lowinski won the Deutscher Fernsehpreis (German Television award) for best series.

In April 2011 Sat.1 renewed Danni Lowinski for its third season.

== Adaptations ==
In October 2010, it was announced that The CW is planning to develop an adaptation based on the original German series. This would have made it the first German TV series adapted for an American audience. A pilot starring Amanda Walsh in the lead role was filmed by director Richard Shepard, but the planned adaptation did not appear on the 2011-12 schedule.

In March 2013, SBS6 announced there would be a Dutch adaptation of the same title.
