= Vučedol =

- Location within Croatia
- 45.336°N 19.06°E

Vučedol (lit. 'Wolf's Valley') in Croatia, is an archeological site, an elevated ground on the right bank of the River Danube, which also forms the border with Serbia. Vučedol became the eponym of the eneolithic Vučedol culture.

It is estimated that the site had once been home to about 3,000 inhabitants, making it one of the largest and most important European centers of its time.

Artifacts from the Vučedol site are located in the Archaeological Museum in Zagreb, and the City museum of Vukovar. The site itself has hosted the Vučedol Culture Museum since 2015.

Due to extremely favourable strategic position, Vučedol has always been open to colonization. Some of the most important archaeological discoveries belonging to the Vučedol culture have been made at this site.

Archaeological research has confirmed finds of the Baden culture, Vučedol culture as well as Kostolac culture on the site of Vučedol.

The site is located roughly 5 kilometres (3.1 mi) downstream from the city of Vukovar. During the Battle of Vukovar in 1991, the Vučedol site was destroyed by being used as a firing base for the Serbian Yugoslav People's Army artillery and tanks in the three-month bombardment of Vukovar. The site was later restored and the Vučedol Culture Museum established on the grounds.
