= Studies of Waldorf education =

A number of national, international and topic-based studies have been made of Waldorf education. In 2005, British educational researchers Philip Woods, Martin Ashley and Glenys Woods evaluated Steiner-Waldorf schools for the United Kingdom's Department for Education and Skills. As part of their study, the authors evaluated the state of research as of 2005 and said

"The research studies reviewed give a cumulative sense of a positive relationship between Steiner schools and learning, achievement and pupils' development of academic, creative, social and other capabilities important in the holistic growth of the person. The research evidence has to be interpreted with caution, however. Studies are often small scale and conducted in different cultural and national contexts that may affect the confidence with which findings can be generalized to other settings. Overall, there is a lack of rigorous research on the impact of Steiner school education on learning and achievement and little research which systematically compares Steiner and mainstream schools."

== 2003 California State University study on science literacy of Waldorf-educated students ==
A 2003 study conducted by David Jelinek and Li-Ling Sun, both of the College of Education at CalState - Sacramento, investigated empirically the quality of science education at a series of Waldorf schools. They also examined the curriculum of the first Waldorf school as designed by Rudolf Steiner. These curricula were evaluated in comparison to the traditional criteria of Experiential learning, Developmentalism, Spiral curriculum, Triarchic intelligence, and Multiple intelligences. The authors also used a number of cognitive and academic tests to evaluate the performance of Waldorf-educated students in comparison to age-matched public school-educated peers. Attempts were made to remove the influence of researcher bias by involving analysts with no prior Waldorf background and by using multiple methods to gather quantitative and qualitative data, which was then analyzed using a variety of different statistical measures including central tendency, variability, frequency distributions, correlations, regression, t-tests and chi-square tests.

The results of Jelinek and Sun's study are complex. For one, it became clear to the study authors early on that Waldorf schools do not match the national standards for science education well. That being said, they also described that there were some benefits of a Waldorf education in terms of open-ended thinking and inquiry. Even so, there were numerous theories and ideas prevalent throughout the curricula studied that were patently pseudoscientific and steeped in magical thinking. These ideas included the evolutionary idea that animals develop from humans, that human spirits are physically incarnated into "soul qualities that manifested themselves into various animal forms," that the current geological formations on Earth have evolved through so-called "Lemurian" and "Atlantiean" epochs, or that the 4 kingdoms of nature are "mineral, plant, animal, and man." All of these are directly contradicted by mainstream scientific knowledge and have no basis in any form of conventional science. The authors contend that these notions are distinct from any factual inaccuracies found in modern public school textbooks, as the inaccuracies in the latter are of a specific and minute nature that results from the progress of science. The latter (those inaccuracies present in Waldorf textbooks), however, are the result of a mode of thinking that has no valid basis in reason or logic.

== 2012 US Study ==
A 2012 study compared the reading and math standardized test scores obtained in public Waldorf schools in the United States with scores for their districts as a whole, as well as scores in matched comparison schools. Public Waldorf school scores were lower than those of regular public schools in earlier grades (second and third), but higher in seventh and eighth grade. The authors suggested that "the Waldorf experience provided a slower academic build-up resulting in poorer test scores in the lower grades followed by higher levels of advanced performance in the 8th grade." The authors concluded that a content analysis of parents' comments about the schools supports the impression that public Waldorf schools offer a more holistic approach to education, "with greater emphasis on the arts, community and developmentally appropriate practice."

== 2012 German study ==
A 2012 study of Waldorf pupils in Germany concluded that, in comparison to state school pupils, Waldorf students are significantly more enthusiastic about learning, report having more fun and being less bored in school, more often feel individually met, and learn more from school about their personal academic strengths. 85% of the Waldorf students reported that their school environment was pleasant and supportive, compared to 60% of the state school students. More than twice as many Waldorf students report having good relationships with teachers. Waldorf pupils also have significantly less physical ailments such as headaches, stomach aches, or disrupted sleep. There was no statistically significant difference between the state and Waldorf pupils’ achievement on state examinations; this is also true when test scores are compared based on the type of high school diploma granted.

== 2009 PISA study ==
A 2009 PISA study found that, compared to state school students, European Waldorf students are significantly more capable in the sciences, slightly less capable in mathematics; and comparable in reading ability.

== 2009 study of later introduction of reading ==
A 2009 study comparing Waldorf and public school students in New Zealand found that the Waldorf students, who had no formal instruction in reading in pre-school or kindergarten, caught up in reading ability by around age 10, at which point there was "no difference in reading achievement between children who had been given early instruction in reading and those who had not".

A 2008 report by the Cambridge-based Primary Review, found that "educational alternatives, including Steiner-Waldorf schools and home schooling, produce better academic results."

== 2006 Austrian study ==
A 2006 PISA study of Austrian students found that Austrian Waldorf students are above average in science. The Waldorf students did best in understanding the questions raised by science and the ability to solve scientific problems and were also above the OECD average for their joy and interest in science. The authors concluded "The relatively high expertise in science among Waldorf students, in combination with their very high motivation and interest in these subjects, as well as the various pedagogical principles, suggest that regular schools can learn from the Waldorf schools, particularly with regard to concrete application to the sciences."

== 2006 Health study ==
Studies have found Waldorf pupils to have a lower incidence of allergies and allergic-like symptoms, an effect which correlated with the extent to which they lived an "anthroposophic lifestyle" generally - in particular with reduced use of antibiotics, and antipyretics.

== 2005 UK comparison with mainstream education ==
A UK Department for Education and Skills report noted significant differences in curriculum and pedagogical approach between Waldorf/Steiner and mainstream schools and suggested that each type of school could learn from the other type's strengths: in particular, that state schools could benefit from Waldorf education's early introduction and approach to modern foreign languages; combination of block (class) and subject teaching for younger children; development of speaking and listening through an emphasis on oral work; good pacing of lessons through an emphasis on rhythm; emphasis on child development guiding the curriculum and examinations; approach to art and creativity; attention given to teachers’ reflective activity and heightened awareness (in collective child study for example); and collegial structure of leadership and management, including collegial study.

== 1998–2008 Australian studies ==
A major quantitative and qualitative study of senior secondary students in the three largest Steiner schools in Australia was undertaken by Jennifer Gidley in the mid-1990s. It investigated the Steiner-educated students’ views and visions of the future, replicating a major study with a large cross-section of mainstream and other private school students undertaken a few years prior. The findings as summarised below contrasted markedly in some areas with the research from mainstream students at the time.

- Steiner-educated students were able to develop richer, more detailed images of their 'preferred futures' than mainstream students.
- About three-quarters were able to envision positive changes in both the environment and human development; almost two-thirds were able to imagine positive changes in the socio-economic area;
- They tended to focus on ‘social’ rather than ‘technological’ ways of solving problems;
- In envisioning futures without war, their visions primarily related to improvements in human relationships and communication through dialogue and conflict resolution rather than a 'passive peace' image;
- 75% had many ideas on what aspects of human development (including their own) needed to be changed to enable the fulfilment of their aspirations. These included more activism, value changes, spirituality, future care and better education;
- In spite of identifying many of the same concerns as other students – global-scale environmental destruction, social injustice and threats of war – most of the Steiner students seemed undaunted in terms of their own will to do something to create their 'preferred future';
- There were no gender differences found in the students’ preferred futures visions or in the richness and fluidity of their creative images.

In 2008, the Rudolf Steiner Schools Association of Australia funded a research project to investigate the relationships between Steiner pedagogy and related 21st century academic discourses. The report on the project is called "Turning Tides: Creating Dialogue between Rudolf Steiner and 21st Century Academic Discourses". A bibliography of all the studies that were identified is also available online as is the extended project data.

== Creativity and artistry ==
A study comparing the drawing ability of children in Steiner/Waldorf, Montessori and traditional schools concluded that "the approach to art education in Steiner schools is conducive not only to more highly rated imaginative drawings in terms of general drawing ability and use of color but also to more accurate and detailed observational drawings," while another study found that Waldorf pupils average higher scores on the Torrance Test of Creative Thinking Ability than state-school students.

== Comparative study of moral development ==
An American study found that Waldorf-educated students scored significantly higher on a test of moral reasoning than students in public high schools and students in a religiously affiliated high school. Waldorf students were also far more likely to volunteer opinions about the survey and research in general, suggesting possible improvements in the survey technique and offering alternative ways of resolving the moral dilemmas raised in the survey.

1999 study of Waldorf methods for at-risk students

The Thomas E. Mathews Community School in Yuba County, California serves high-risk juvenile offenders, many of whom have learning disabilities. The school switched to Waldorf methods in the 1990s. A 1999 study of the school found that students had "improved attitudes toward learning, better social interaction and excellent academic progress." This study identified the integration of the arts "into every curriculum unit and almost every classroom activity" of the school as the most effective tool to help students overcome patterns of failure. The study also found significant improvements in reading and math scores, student participation, focus, openness and enthusiasm, as well as emotional stability, civility of interaction and tenacity.

== 1995 South African Case Study ==
A Master's degree Case Study was conducted in 1995 in South Africa by Carol Knox entitled: The Rudolf Steiner approach to education: A qualitative study with particular reference to the pre-primary and primary phase of a Waldorf school in KwaZulu-Natal. Abstract of thesis: The location of this work within the holistic world view or the symbolic science paradigm indicates that the case study approach will be most likely to maximize valid findings. The theoretical and evaluative demands of this study precluded the use of more quantitative methods. The aim was to attempt a demystification of Waldorf Education by means of in-depth interpretation and reconstruction, in other words, using descriptions which have contextual validity. The pre-primary and primary phases of a school in KwaZulu Natal was studied. The perspective of Walker using condensed fieldwork was employed. Despite the limitations of this mode of study it is hoped to give the reader an expectation of what a Waldorf School is like.

== 1995 U.S. Waldorf schools survey ==
A 1995 survey of U.S. Waldorf schools found that parents overall experienced the Waldorf schools as achieving their major aims for students, and described the education as one that "integrates the aesthetic, spiritual and interpersonal development of the child with rigorous intellectual development", preserving students' enthusiasm for learning so that they develop a better sense of self-confidence and self-direction. Some parents described upper grades teachers as overextended, without sufficient time to relate to parental needs and input, and wished for more open and reciprocal parent-school support. Both parents and students sometimes described colleges of teachers as being insular and unresponsive.

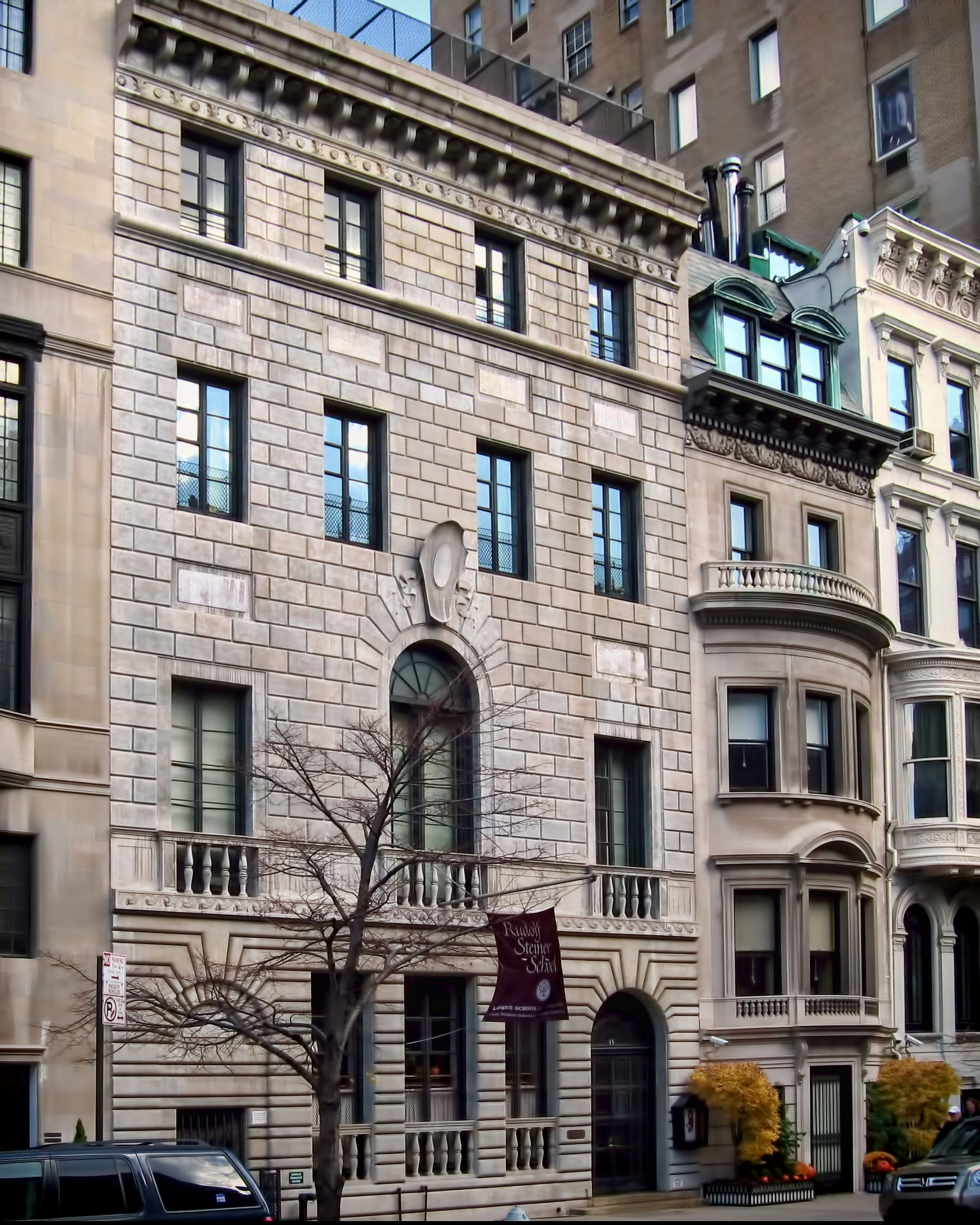
Rudolf Steiner School, New York City

The students overall were positive about the school and its differences; experienced the school as a "community of friends"; and spoke of the opportunity to grow and develop through the broad range of activities offered, to learn when they were ready to learn, to develop imagination, and to come to understand the world as well as oneself. Many students spoke of the kindness of their peers and of learning to think things through clearly for themselves, not to jump to conclusions, and to remain positive in the face of problems and independent of pressure from others to think as they do. Improvements the students suggested included more after-school sports programs, more physical education classes, more preparation for standardized testing, a class in world politics and computer classes. Faculty, parents and students were united in expressing a desire to improve the diversity of the student body, especially by increasing representation of minority groups such as African Americans and Hispanic Americans.

== Standardized testing: USA and Germany ==
Waldorf students are less exposed to standardized testing; such tests are generally absent in the elementary school years. Despite this, U.S. Waldorf pupils' SAT scores have usually come above the national average, especially on verbal measures. Studies comparing students' performance on college-entrance examinations in Germany found that as a group, Waldorf graduates passed the exam at double to triple the rate of students graduating from the state education system, and that students who had attended Waldorf schools for their entire education passed at a much higher rate (40% vs. 26%) than those who only had part of their education at a Waldorf school. Educational successes of private Waldorf schools may partially reflect the social status of their students.
