= Max Hoff =

Max Hoff may refer to:

- Max Hoff (mobster) (1892–1941), Jewish boxer and gambler
- Max Hoff (illustrator) (1903–1985), Austrian illustrator
- Max Hoff (canoeist) (born 1982), German sprint canoeist
