= Max Hoff (illustrator) =

Austrian artist

- Max Hoff in his 30s.
- Born: Maximilian J. A. Hofbauer; Vienna, Austria

Max Hoff also Max Hof or Maximilian J.A. Hofbauer (1903–1985) was an Austrian illustrator best known for his work in advertisements for the London menswear store Simpson of Piccadilly and for Astor Cigarettes. His art was highly representative of the fashion of the 1950s and 1960s in Western Europe and North America. He was born in Vienna.

== Biography ==
=== Early years ===
Hoff was born in Vienna in 1903. He studied portrait and landscape painting at the Academy of Fine Arts in Vienna, where he began to make a name for himself through his stage and costume illustrations. A number of his fashion designs were published under the alias Max Hof in the European journal International Textiles, where Alex Simpson, the owner of the largest menswear store in Britain, Simpson of Piccadilly, saw them.

Ad for Simpson, 1959

=== Simpson of Piccadilly ===
In 1936, Alex Simpson brought Hoff, then 33, to London and commissioned him to produce a series of illustrations of the kind of handsome, virile, sporting men wearing Simpson clothes that were to become the representation of Simpson style for a quarter of a century. Later, once Simpson added women's clothes to its stock, these would be joined by fashionable, elegant and charming women. Initially used in direct mail brochures, Hoff's illustrations soon became the mainstay of Simpson advertising. Bill Crawford, the advertising agent at Simpson, recognized the power of this imagery. When Hitler annexed Austria in 1938, Crawford persuaded Max Hoff to move to London, where he married Margarete Popper in December and where his two children were born.

His drawings of groups of impeccably dressed male figures, usually in a smiling and relaxed attitude, became the signature style of Simpson of Piccadilly and their DAKS brand of menswear in press advertising until the early 1960s.

FeWa ad from 1958

=== FeWa and Astor Cigarettes ===
By the end of the 1950s, Hoff had started to work with the German advertising agency Hanns W. Brose GmbH and its enigmatic owner Hanns Walter Brose in Frankfurt. In 1958 a small campaign of only eight—due to a limited budget—ads for the company Böhme Fettchemie GmbH appeared. His illustrations were for FeWa FeinWaschmittel (fine washing powder).

Work with Brose continued well and when Simpson decided to rebrand their advertising in 1961, Hoff ceased working with Simpson and became an exclusive artist for the Hanns W. Brose company.

Hanns W. Brose held an advertising contract for Reemtsma's Astor Cigarettes. In 1956 he transferred the Astor contract to his son Heinz Martin at their branch office in Hamburg. In 1961 Heinz Martin Brose decided to provide a new style for Astor. So began Hoff's most famous campaign, Rendezvous der Prominenz, (roughly translatable as meeting-places of the jet set) which ran until 1967. It was directed first at German and then at international high society, or those who wished to emulate them. Hoff provided over 200 pictures for this series.

Astor ad from 1963
