= Emil Molt =

German industrialist, social reformer and anthroposophist

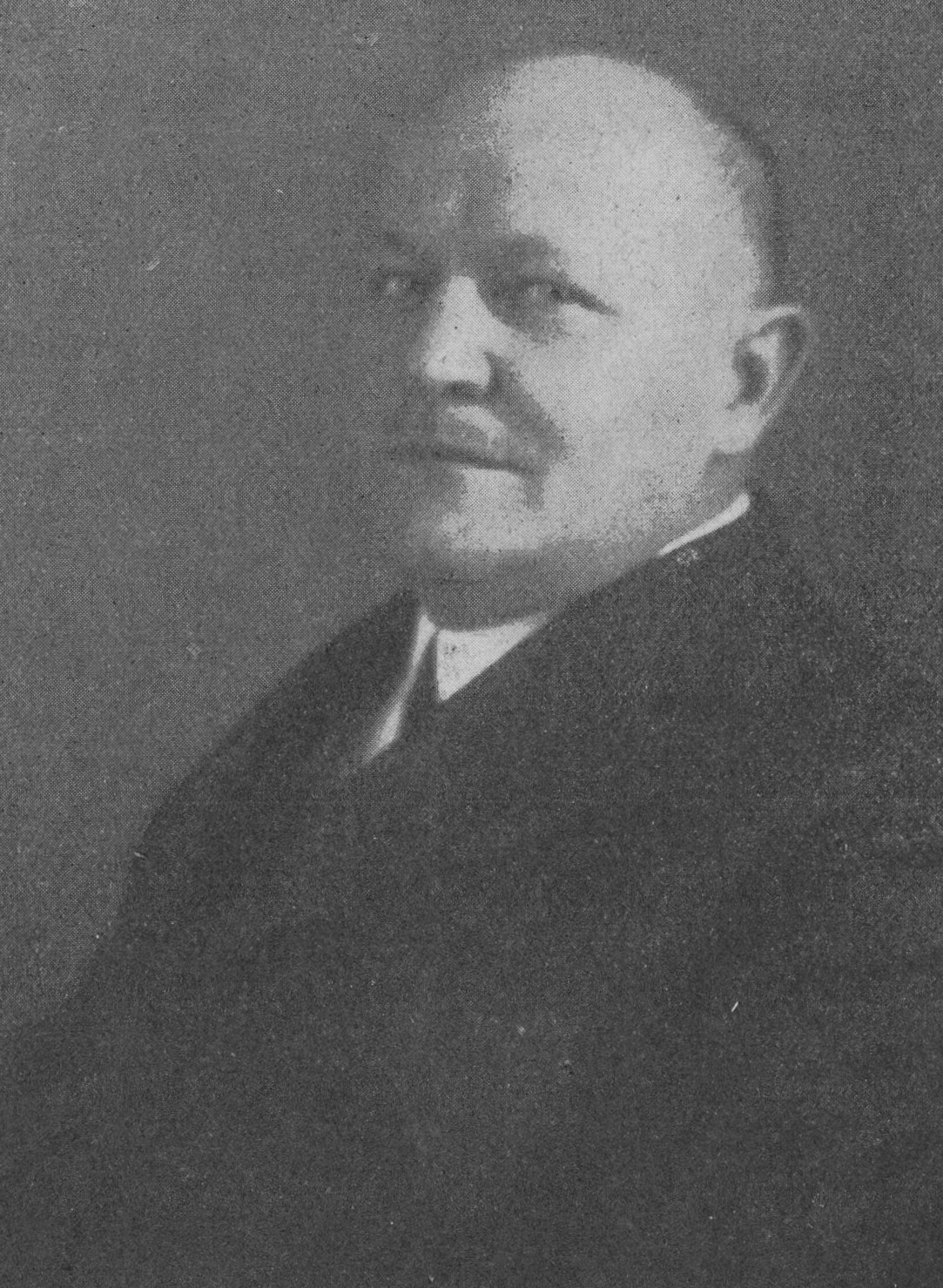
- Born: 14 April 1876
- Died: 16 June 1936 (aged 60)
- Occupation: industrialist
- Known for: Waldorf school
- Spouse: Bertha Molt

Emil Molt (14 April 1876, in Schwäbisch Gmünd, Kingdom of Württemberg – 16 June 1936, in Stuttgart) was a German industrialist, social reformer and anthroposophist. He was the director of the Waldorf-Astoria-Zigarettenfabrik, and with Rudolf Steiner co-founded the first Waldorf school. Hence, Waldorf education was named after the company.

== Background ==
Molt was born in southern Germany and was orphaned as a teenager. He enlisted in the military and worked for Emil Georgii after he was discharged. Georgii's son Emil Jr. hired Molt to work at the Waldorf-Astoria cigarette factory at Stuttgart. He later became its general manager and owner.

A biography written by Molt's daughter detailed how he purchased the Waldorf Astoria brand name from the tobacconist shop in a New York hotel owned by the Astor family.

== Waldorf school ==
Molt's association with Steiner began due to his interest in spirituality, particularly after he signed up as a member of the Theosophical Society in 1906. Steiner was regularly invited to speak in its gatherings. The industrialist also became a follower of Steiner's esoteric philosophy called anthroposophy.

After World War I people believed it was possible to initiate new social arrangements. One of them was Molt, who decided to address the educational needs of his factory workers and their children. For this initiative, he was drawn to Steiner's holistic proposition in education, which holds that teaching must attend to multiple aspects of human experience. Following a series of consultations, Molt and Steiner founded the Waldorf school after gaining the approval of the German Minister of Culture. It opened in September 1919 in Stuttgart, Germany. Molt bought the Uhlandeshohe Restaurant as the school's first building and altered it according to Steiner's specifications. The adjoining properties were later purchased as the school expanded. The Waldorf School opened with twelve teachers. Initially, there were 150 students who were chosen from proletarian families and with parents who belong to the Anthroposophical Society.

Waldorf schools became the largest independent school movement in the world.
