= Associação Comunitária Monte Azul =

Brazilian NGO

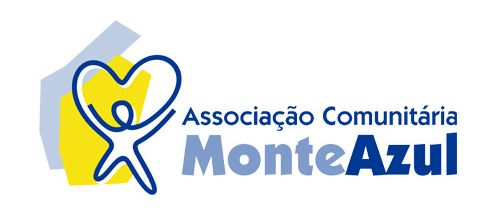
Monte Azul logo

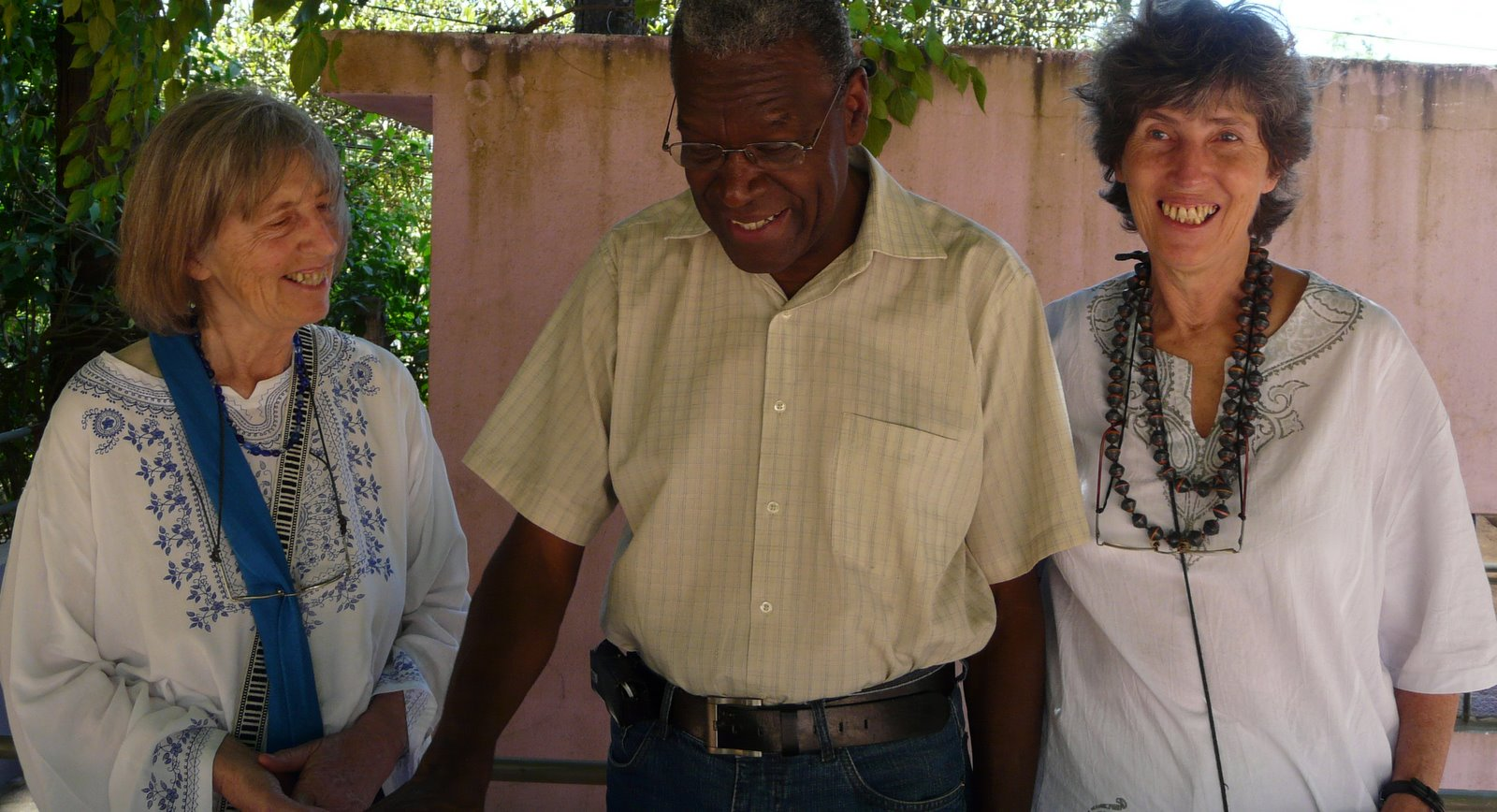
Ute Craemer, Paulo lgnacio and Renate Keller-Ignacio, the initiators of the Associação Comunitária Monte Azul in São Paulo, Brazil

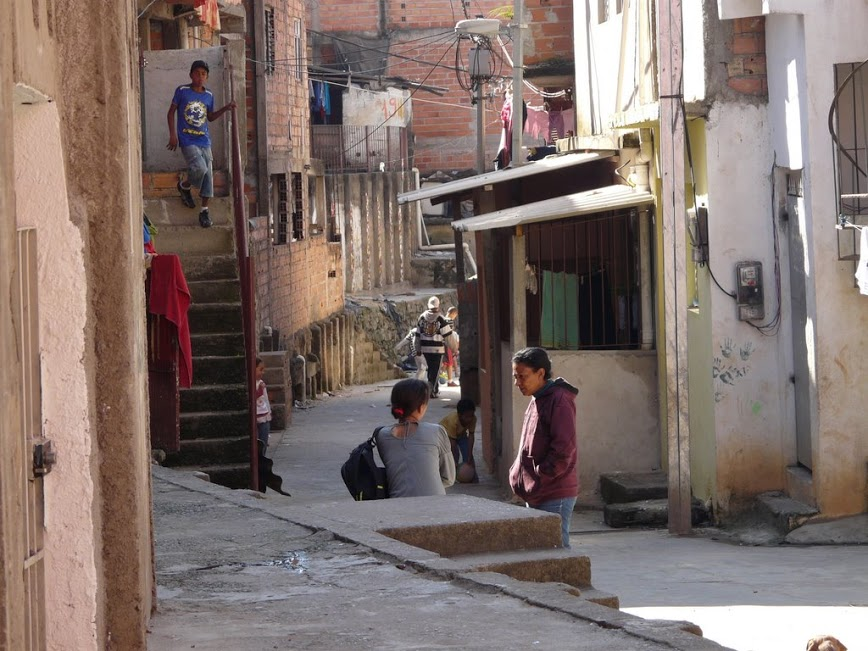
Monte Azul

The Associação Comunitária Monte Azul is a Brazilian NGO that is active in three Favelas in the southern part of São Paulo, M'Boi Mirim / Campo Limpo. The organisation was founded in 1979 by the German Waldorf teacher Ute Craemer together with the residents of the Favela Monte Azul. In the 1980s the work spread to the Favela Peinha nearby and to Horizonte Azul on the southern edge of the city. The project is a successful example in sustainable Development cooperation between equal partners.

The organisation's main areas of work are slum renovation, Education and further education for children and young people, culture, health care and environmental conservation. The Associação Comunitária Monte Azul today has more than 260 employees and receives around 70 overseas volunteers per year, 20 of these from other countries, in particular Germany.

== History ==
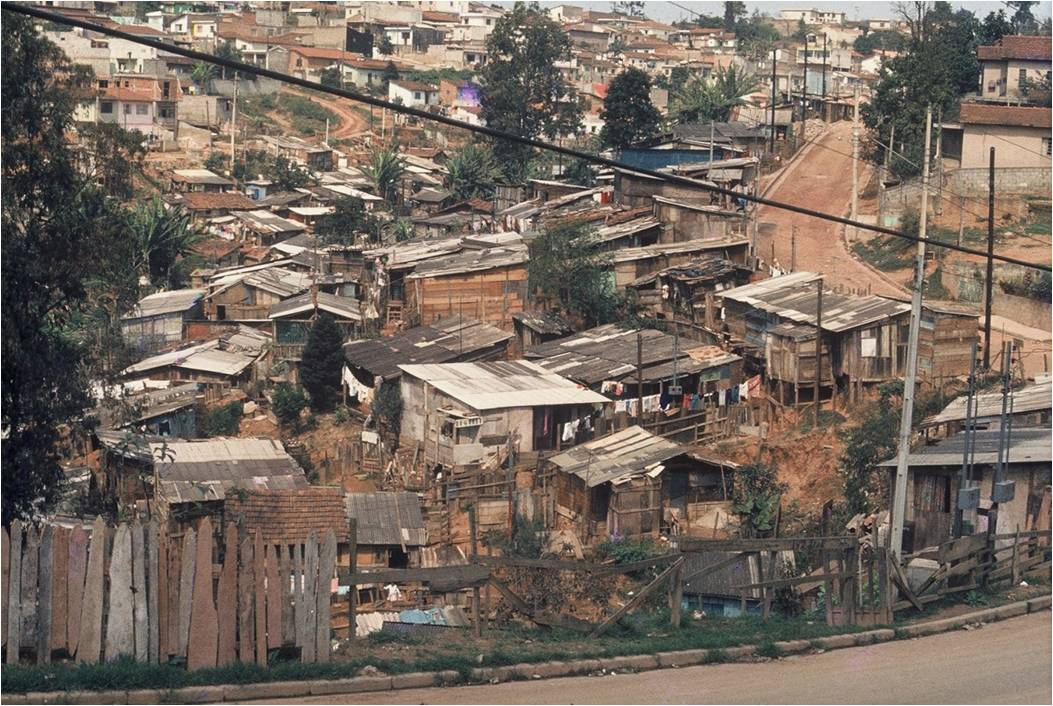
Favela Monte Azul in 1981

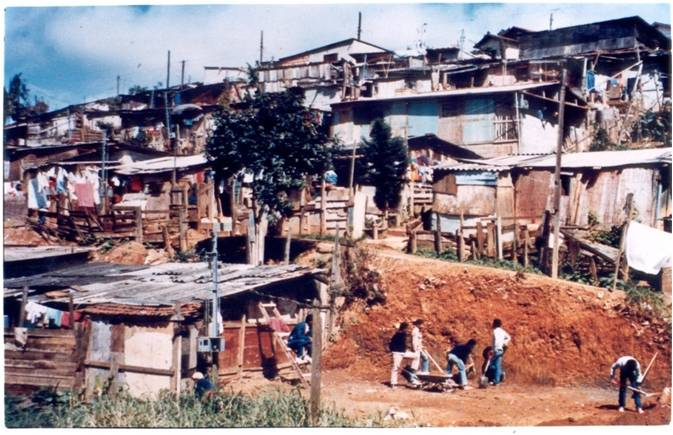
Renovation through community work of the residents.

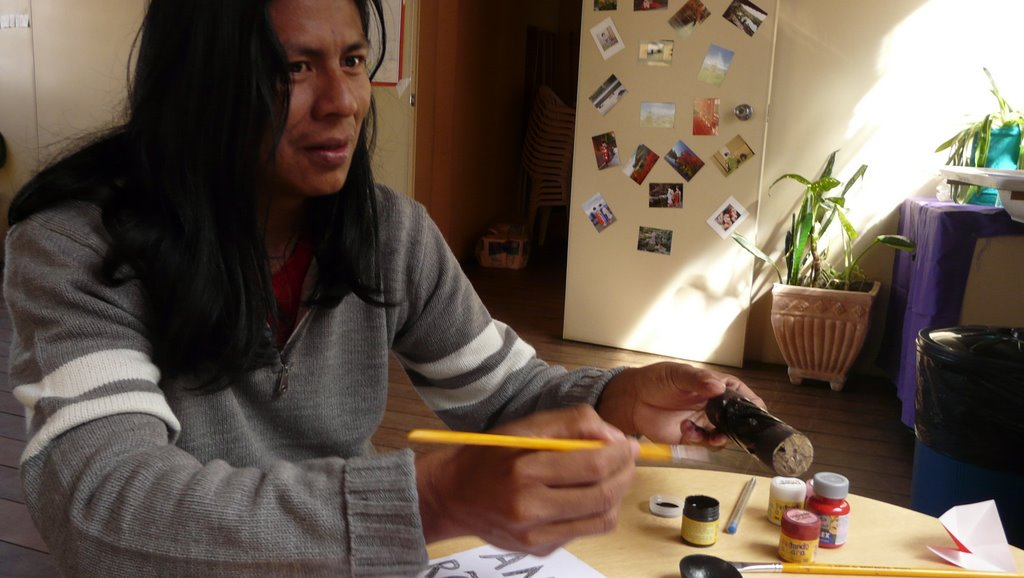
Art education, including traditional indigenous artwork, is an integral part of the organization

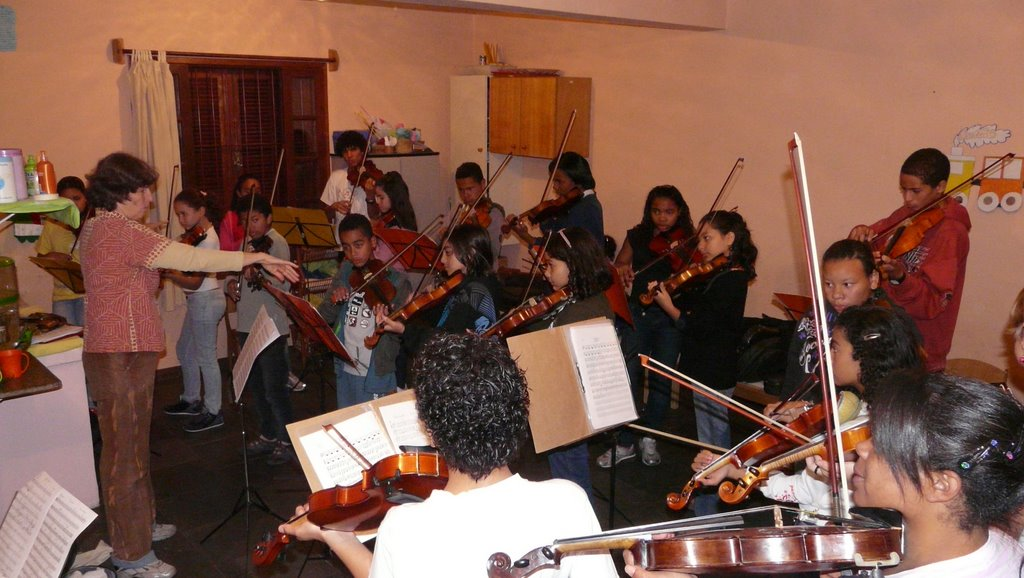
An orchestra with children and youths of the Favela. The instruments originate mainly from German donors

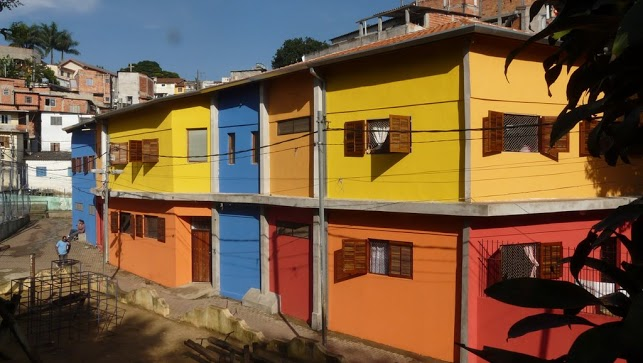
One of the nursery schools houses ten Kindergarten groups and an organic kitchen.

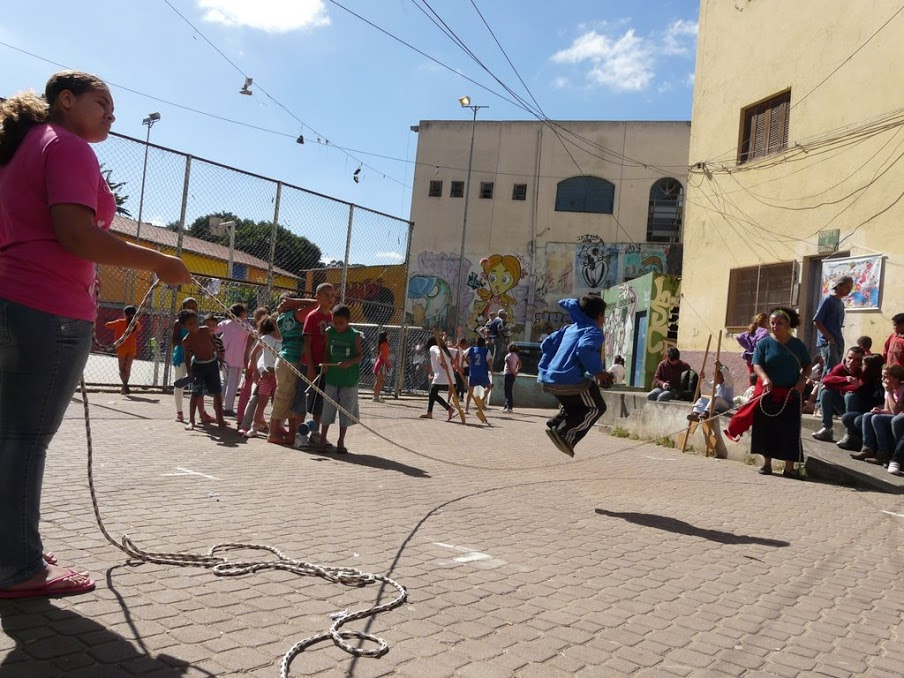
The organisation aims to foster children, no matter what situation they come from. This includes the fine motor control of Kindern in Favelas

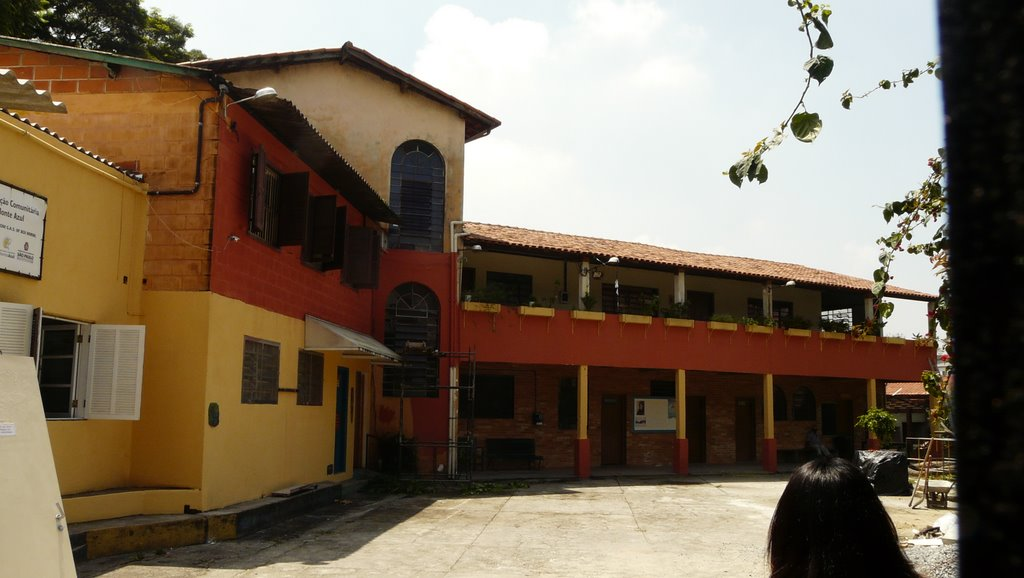
Cultural centre of the community organisation Monte Azul in São Paulo

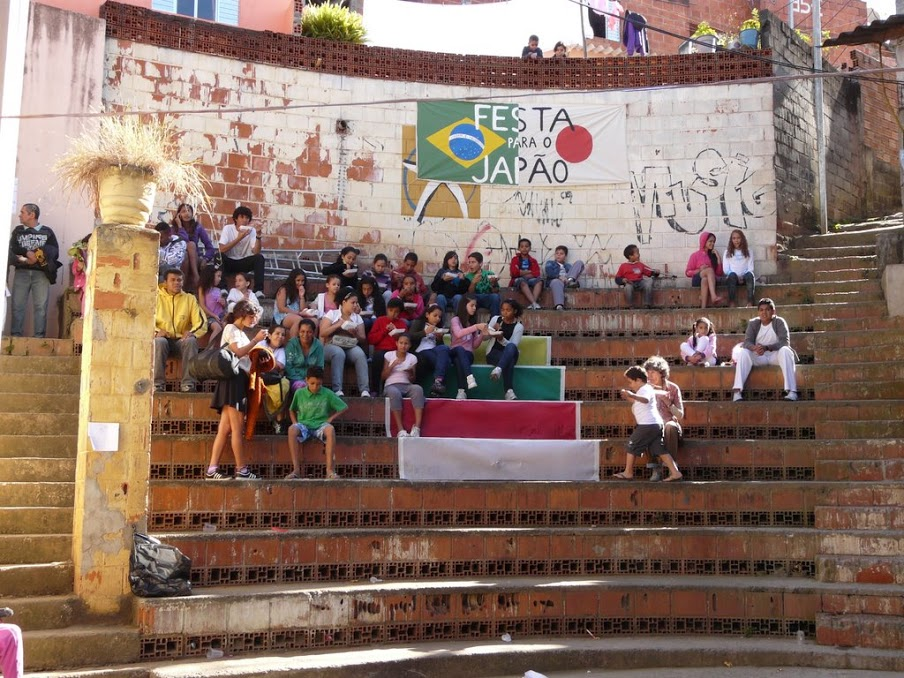
The theatre in the Favela Peinha near Monte Azul.

The Favela Monte Azul, which has around 3000 residents, was established in the 1970s during the period of rapid urbanisation due to the rural depopulation from North-eastern Brazil and the provinces Minas Gerais and Paraná. Through the project, by means of which Ute Craemer wished to awaken some social awareness amongst her students at the Waldorf school, she came into contact with the children of the Favela. It began with afternoon care in Ms Craemer's own home. Out of this impulse to build a bridge between the different classes of Society, a project began that is still growing and continually incorporates new aspects. At present there are an estimated 32,000 people benefitting from the work of Monte Azul.

Monte Azul has become an example for Development Aid and a model for many similar social projects that have come about in Brazil, such as the street theatre group Paidéia, the cultural and social centre Aramitán in São Paulo oder the NGO Associação Comunitária de Barra de Lama. Northern Brazil.

== Education ==
There are some 1350 children and young people between the ages of four months and 21 years being cared for by the créches, nursery schools, training workshops and a local Waldorf school, the work being based on the principles of Waldorf education and Anthroposophy. A further 80 people with Special Needs are cared for in another training workshop. One of the principles of the Associação Comunitária Monte Azul is to not just communicate knowledge but rather to facilitate a comprehensive education for their children and young people that enables them to take their lives into their own hands, encouraging them to change the harsh realities that surround them.

== Culture ==
Through re-enlivening and cultivating local cultural traditions the feeling of self-worth and confidence of the people is strengthened. Through meeting with foreign cultures their horizon is broadened, their consciousness stimulated and they nurture a culture based on peace. In all of its three centres, Monte Azul has theatre and conference rooms as well as libraries so as to give people access to cultural content. A variety of courses, further education, theatrical and musical events take place there, with around 600 people a month participating.

Besides this, they run a music school where children and young people from the Favela are able to learn string instruments, to play in an orchestra and to sing in the choir.

== Teacher enrichment ==
From the start it was essential to further educate and train the co-workers, for they themselves had grown up in the Favela. In this way a culture of study and further education developed that has become a hallmark of Monte Azul.

There is a three-year in-service training programme in Waldorf education that they call by the Indian name for the hummingbird: “Mainumby”. In this way the co-workers of public organisations can train as Waldorf teachers for the accreditation of which they are currently in negotiation with the Brazilian government. In this way the Associação Comunitaria Monte Azul has become a gathering point for socially engaged people and educators. Basic training, internships, research and publication of didactic material and books, couselling in organisational, financial and professional issues for social workers, mentoring of university theses and other areas are increasingly a part of their professional involvement. A project in environmental education was implemented in collaboration with UNESCO as well as a pilot project in establishing women's co-operatives. Besides this, each co-worker, also those with a university degree, does an apprenticeship in social work with the principle of lifelong learning in mind.

== Health ==
In Monte Azul's Ambulatório or clinic, the residents of the Favela as well as those of the neighbouring communities receive treatment free of charge. General practitioners, pediatricians, orthopaedic surgeons, dentists, psychologists and psychiatrists are available for consultation. Treatment takes place on a holistic basis extended through anthroposophical medicine.

In the Casa Angela, a maternity home and centre for mother-and-child health care, women and their families receive medical care and guidance through pregnancy, birth and pre and ante-natal issues throughout the first year of the child. The Casa Angela is the first officially licensed birthing centre in Brazil. It aims to improve the poor level of obstetrics care for low-income families and resist the extremely high rate of caesarians in Brazil.

The Casa da Trilha treats people with addiction and psychiatric problems. Besides this, Monte Azul is a partner of the city of São Paulo in the programme Estratégia Saúde da Família, being responsible for the municipality of São Luís in which live some 320,000 people. The aim of the programme is to try to improve the general medical care of the population.

== Environmental education ==
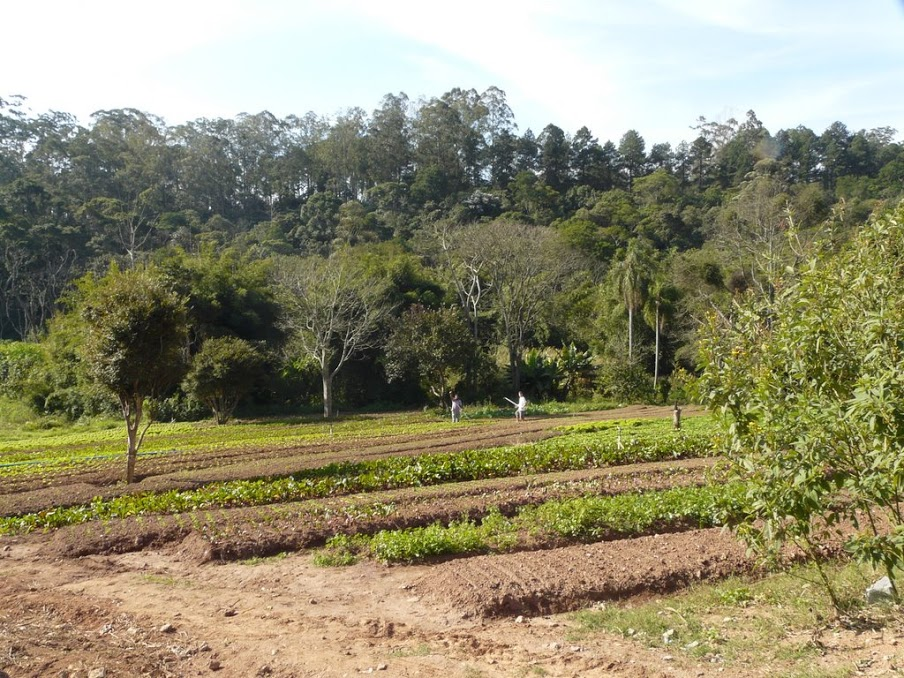
Bio-dynamic garden in Horizonte Azul that provides the Associação Comunitária Monte Azul with its fruit and vegetables.

From the beginning, environmental awareness played a central role. Fruit and vegetables are grown in Horizonte Azul without the use of pesticides and are delivered to the kitchens at Monte Azul, ensuring a balanced and healthy diet for the children.

By organising community projects the residents of Monte Azul cleared the area of garbage, introduced re-cycling and built a sewerage system. In spite of there being no municipal re-cycling the Favela independently runs a centre where garbage collectors (Catadores) can deliver their waste. They have entered into a collaboration on waste research with Technische Universität Berlin.

== Cultural centre ==
In all three areas of activity of the Associação there are stage and dance performances, musical and other artistic presentations. In the Centro Cultural Monte Azul the residents of the Favela and neighbouring suburbs direct their own productions. They can attend concerts, plays and shows of well-known Brazilian and international artists, usually about eight to ten per month.

Besides the productions, courses in dance and sport are offered. Associação hires drama teachers and actors who stage professional productions in theatre workshops with the Favela residents that they normally perform twice a year.

== Concept and co-worker guidance ==
Once a month, approximately 260 staff members, excluding those employed at primary healthcare centres, meet in one of the three favelas, usually at the Monte Azul Cultural Centre. The meetings include professional development, arts courses and cultural exchange activities, often incorporating elements of Waldorf education. The gatherings also provide an opportunity to welcome new staff members and international volunteers and acknowledge those completing their service.

Through these regular meetings a feeling of community and the vision of its activities is cultivated and through creative activities new solutions are found for existing problems. Every second week the co-workers of each Favela meet internally for an afternoon of activities.

To a large extent the organisation has been structured without a hierarchy and is led by a process of consensus. This means that all co-workers can be a party to decisions and take responsibility for the whole. Within this structure aspects of Joseph Beuys's “Social Sculpture" and the ideas on Social threefolding of Rudolf Steiner are realised. In this sense each co-worker is free within his or her own sphere of work and can shape it in the manner he or she feels comfortable with. In addition, further work on Waldorf education is studied.

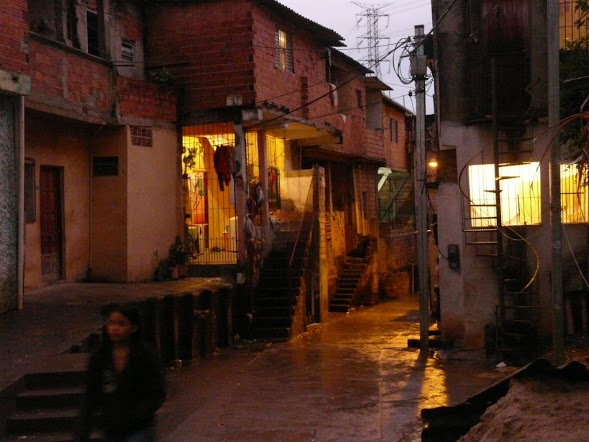
Monte Azul at night: The roads have all been paved and the rain no longer causes avalanches of mud

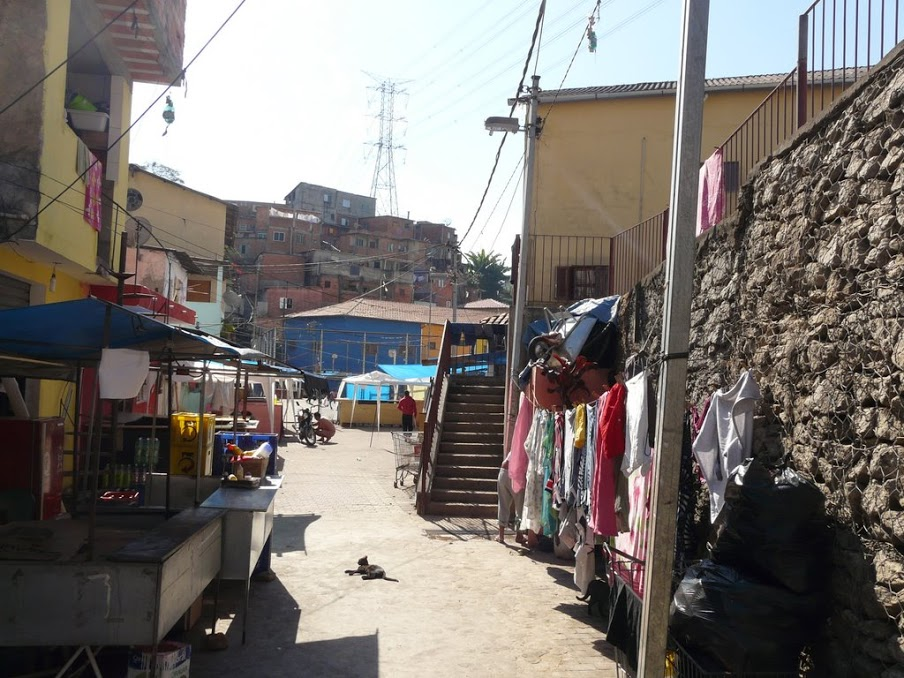
The path covering the effluent canal in the Favela that used to be an evil-smelling river.

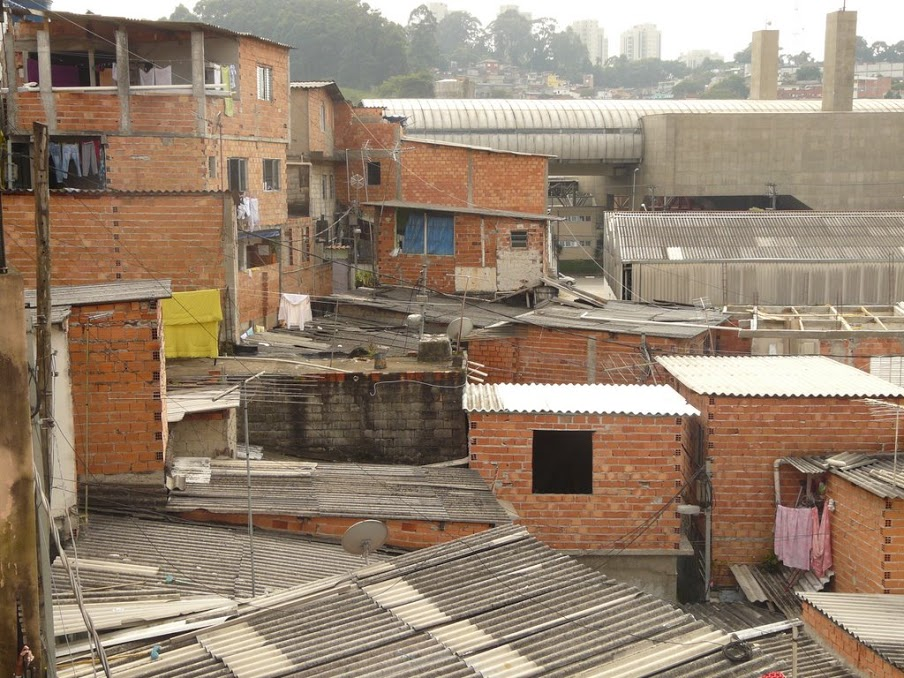
The roofs have in the meantime all been sealed, the houses have foundations and solid walls.

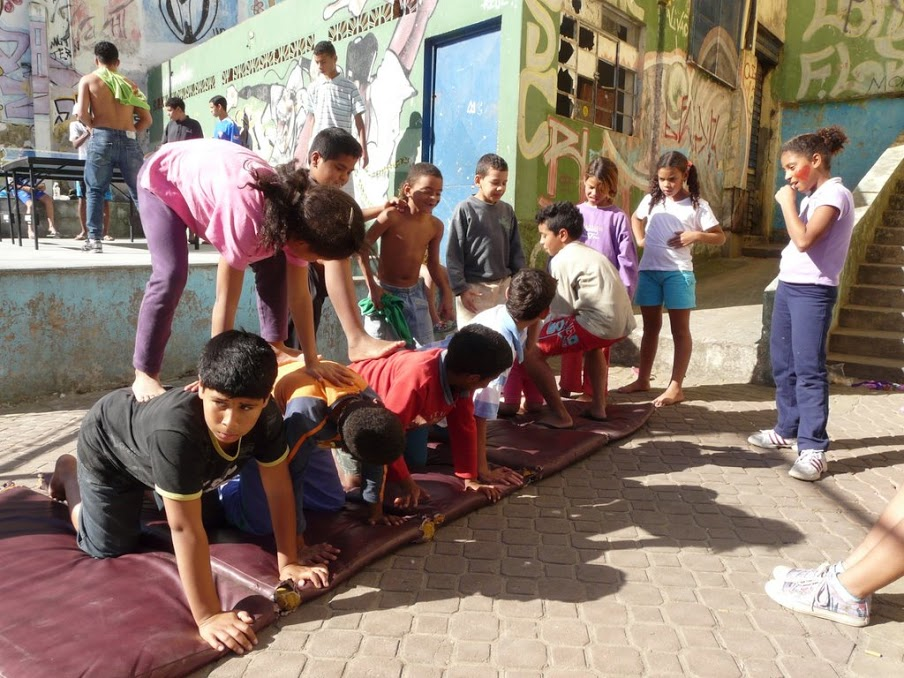
Circus and Games are educational tools in Monte Azul.

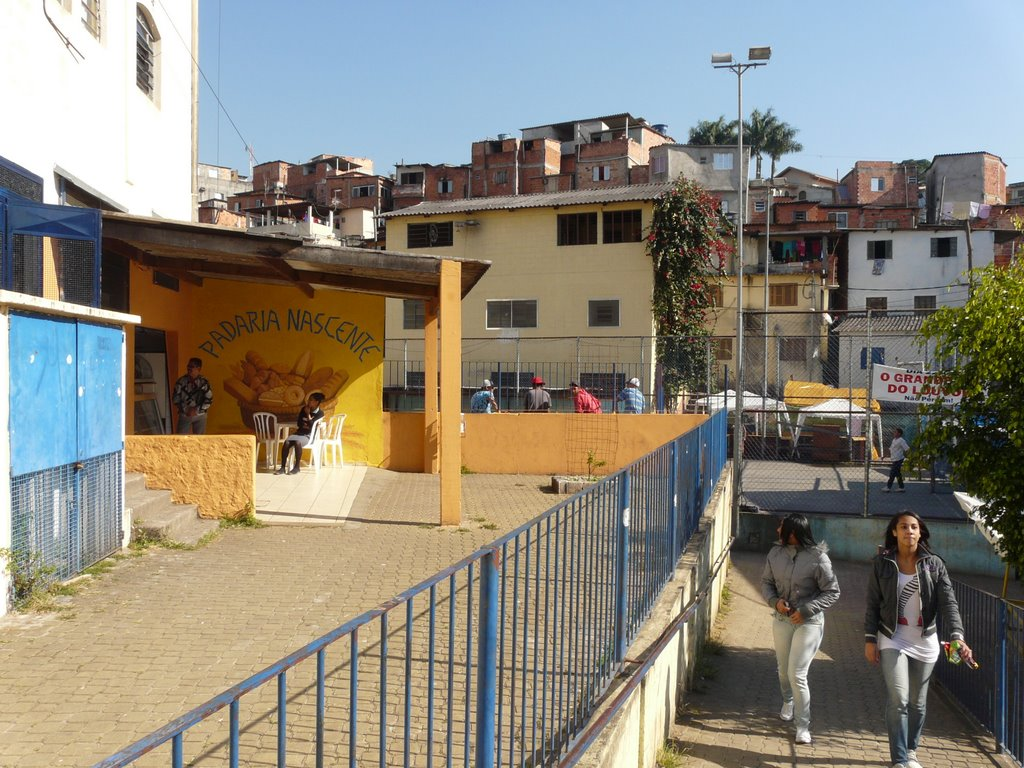
Organic bakery in the Favela Monte Azul.

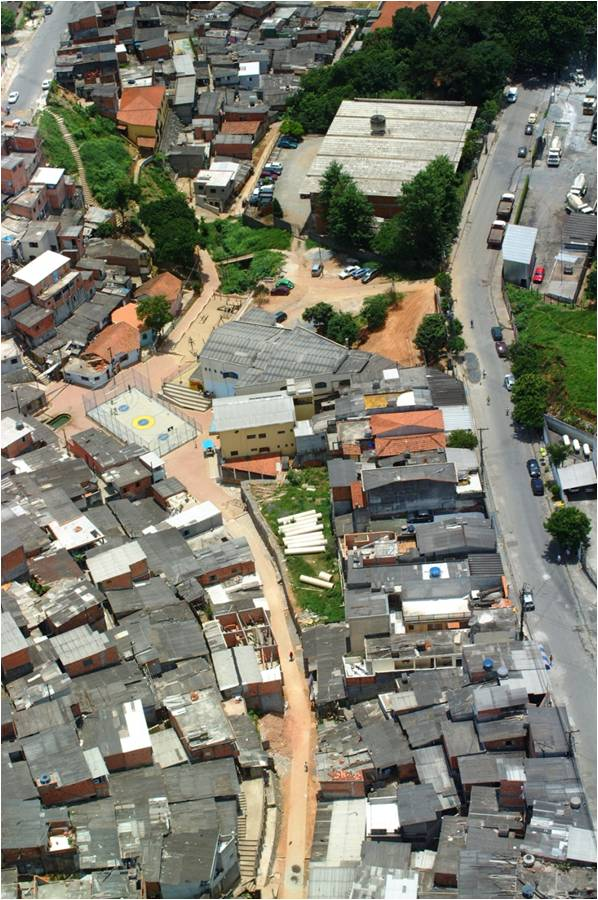
The Favela Monte Azul seen from above.

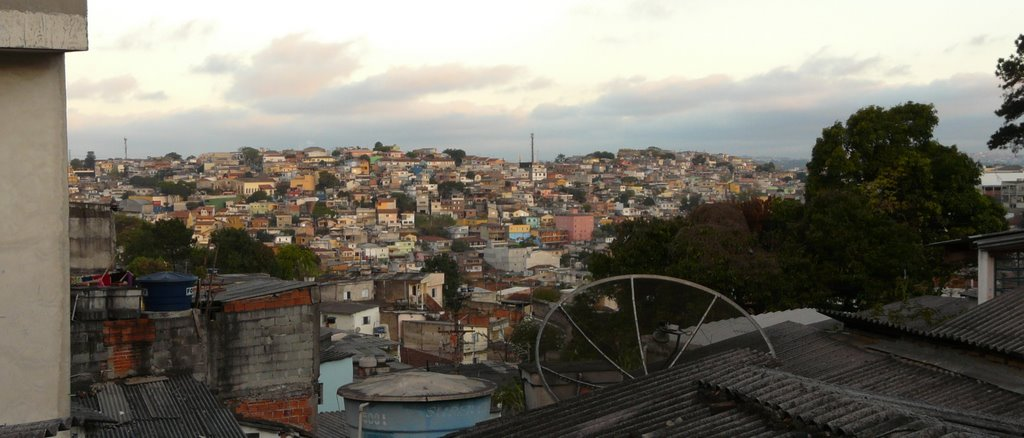
The suburb Monte Azul in São Paulo

== Awards ==
- ITAU-UNICEF-Prize 1995.
- Culture prize of the city of São Paulo 1995.
- Brotherhood Award of the Goodwill-Legion, Brasilia 1996.
- Efficiency Prize (Kanitz Foundation, Brazil 1997)
- Preis der deutschen Pestalozzistiftung, 1997.
- Criança-Cidadã-Prize of the Brazilian Government 1998.
- Ashoka Prize for Innovative Ideas, Brazil 1998.
- Prêmio Criança da Abrinq, 1998.
- Paul-Harris-Fellow Prize (Rotary Club)

== Literature ==
- Ute Craemer: Favela Children SouthernCrossReview.org 2013 ASIN B00B908MMS.
- Dunja Batarilo: Die Brückenbauerin. Wie Ute Craemer die Favela Monte Azul verwandelte, ISBN 978-3-942073-28-8. (An authorised biography)
- Ute Craemer, Renate Ignacio Keller: Transformar e possível. Editora Peirópolis, 2010, ISBN 978-85-7596-135-3.
- Ute Craemer: Favela Monte Azul: Hoffnungen, Ziele, Erfahrungen. Sozialarbeit in São Paulo. Verlag Freies Geistesleben, 1987, ISBN 3-7725-0896-0.
- Angela Gehrke da Silva: Als Hebamme in Brazil. Urachhaus, 2003, ISBN 3-8251-7418-2.
