= Thomas E. Mathews Community School =

School in California, United States

Coordinates: 39°8′52″N 121°35′29″W

Information
- Grades: 7-12
- Enrollment: 22 (2023-2024)

The Thomas E. Mathews Community School is a Waldorf-inspired public school serving at-risk students in grades 7 through 12 with the goal of their returning to district public schools. T.E. Mathews Community School is located in Marysville, California and is overseen by the Yuba County Office of Education. The school's mission is "To provide an educational program which reinforces the physical, emotional and intellectual growth of all students, as well as nurturing love of learning that produces positive and productive members of society."

== Program ==
The T. E. Mathews Community School uses group and individual assignments, storytelling, oral recitation, and thematic lessons infused with the arts to help mitigate existing learning problems and help students to work towards earning the credits they need for high school graduation. Special education services are delivered by the classroom teacher who works in conjunction with a resource teacher. Several festivals and assemblies featuring student work are held throughout the year and parents are encouraged to visit the school often. Total enrollment in the 2009-2010 school year was 30 students, 96.7% of whom were classified by the state as being "socioeconomically disadvantaged."

== Student progress ==
The T. E. Mathews School met the federal criteria for Adequate Yearly Progress for the 2009-2010 school year. Preliminary research conducted at Stanford University in 1999 suggested that length of enrollment at T. E. Mathews Community School predicted academic achievement in mathematics and language arts. The author of the study, educational psychologist Ryan Babineaux, felt the students' overall "excellent" academic progress, improved social skills and positive attitude toward school could be attributed to the school's nurturing atmosphere and the dedication of its teachers.

The school's approach to working with at-risk students has received scholarly attention and teacher and student experiences at the T.E. Mathews School are also described in the book The Flickering Mind: Saving Education from the False Promise of Technology by Todd Oppenheimer.
