= Waldorf education =

Educational philosophy

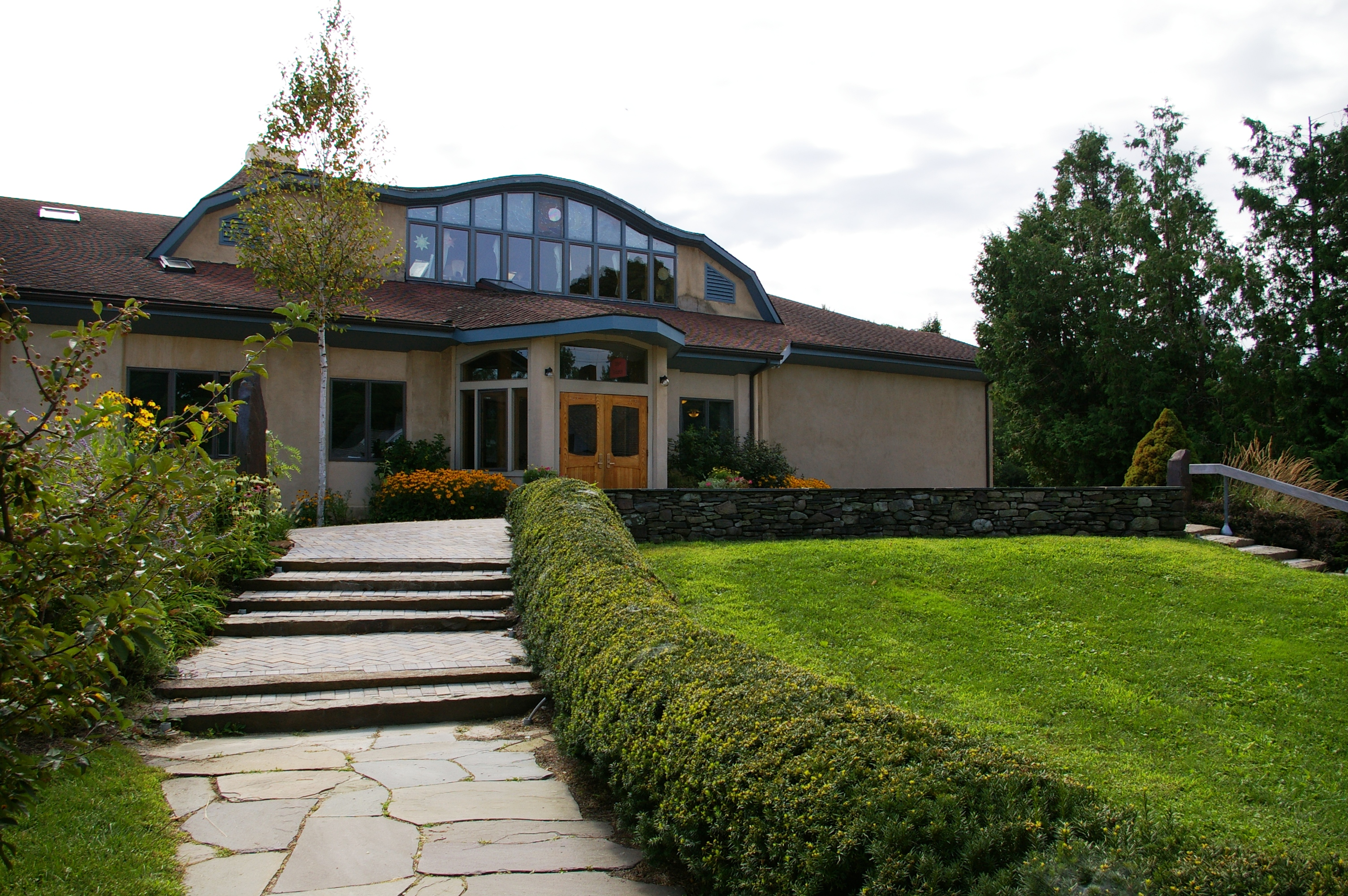
Hawthorne Valley Waldorf School, Ghent, New York

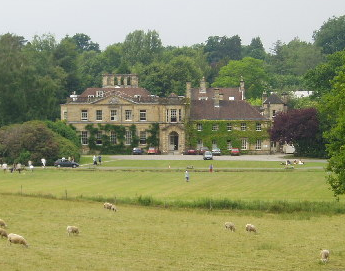
Michael Hall School, Forest Row, Sussex, UK

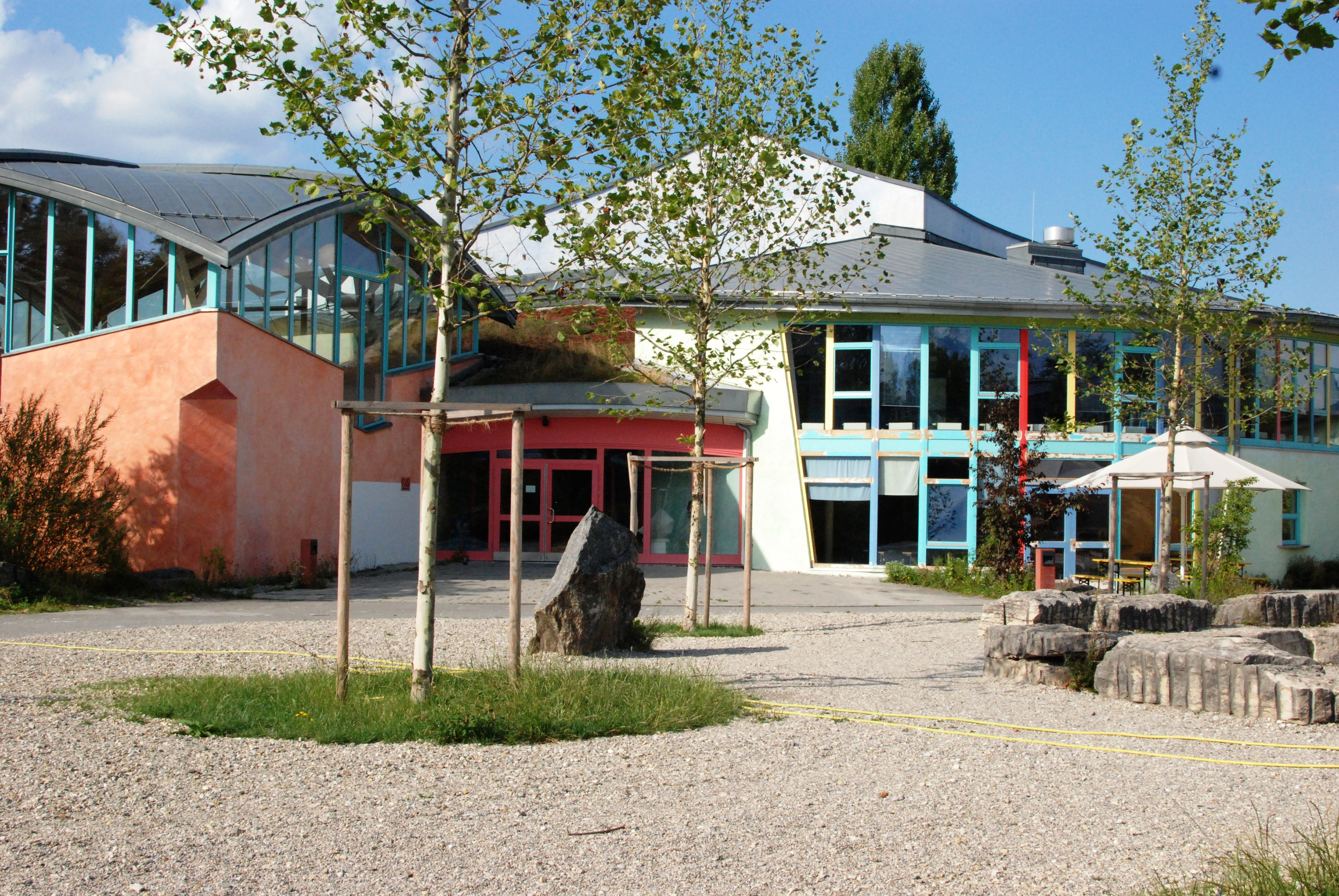
Waldorf school in Ismaning, Bavaria

Waldorf education, also known as Steiner education, is based on the educational philosophy of Rudolf Steiner, the founder of anthroposophy. Its educational style is holistic, intended to develop pupils' intellectual, artistic, and practical skills, with a focus on imagination and creativity. Individual teachers have a great deal of autonomy in curriculum content, teaching methods, and governance. Qualitative assessments of student work are integrated into the daily life of the classroom, with standardized testing limited to what is required to enter post-secondary education.

The first Waldorf school opened in 1919 in Stuttgart, Germany. A century later, it has become the largest independent school movement in the world, with more than 1,200 independent schools and nearly 2,000 kindergartens in 75 countries, as well as more than 500 centers for special education in more than 40 countries. There are also numerous Waldorf-based public schools, charter schools, and academies, as well as a homeschooling movement. Germany, the United States, and the Netherlands have the most Waldorf schools.

Many Waldorf schools have faced controversy due to Steiner's connections to racist ideology and magical thinking. Others have faced regulatory audits and closure due to concerns over substandard treatment of children with special educational needs. Critics of Waldorf education point out the mystical nature of anthroposophy and the incorporation of Steiner's esoteric ideas into the curriculum. Waldorf schools have also been linked to the outbreak of infectious diseases due to the vaccine hesitancy of many Waldorf parents.

== Origins and history ==
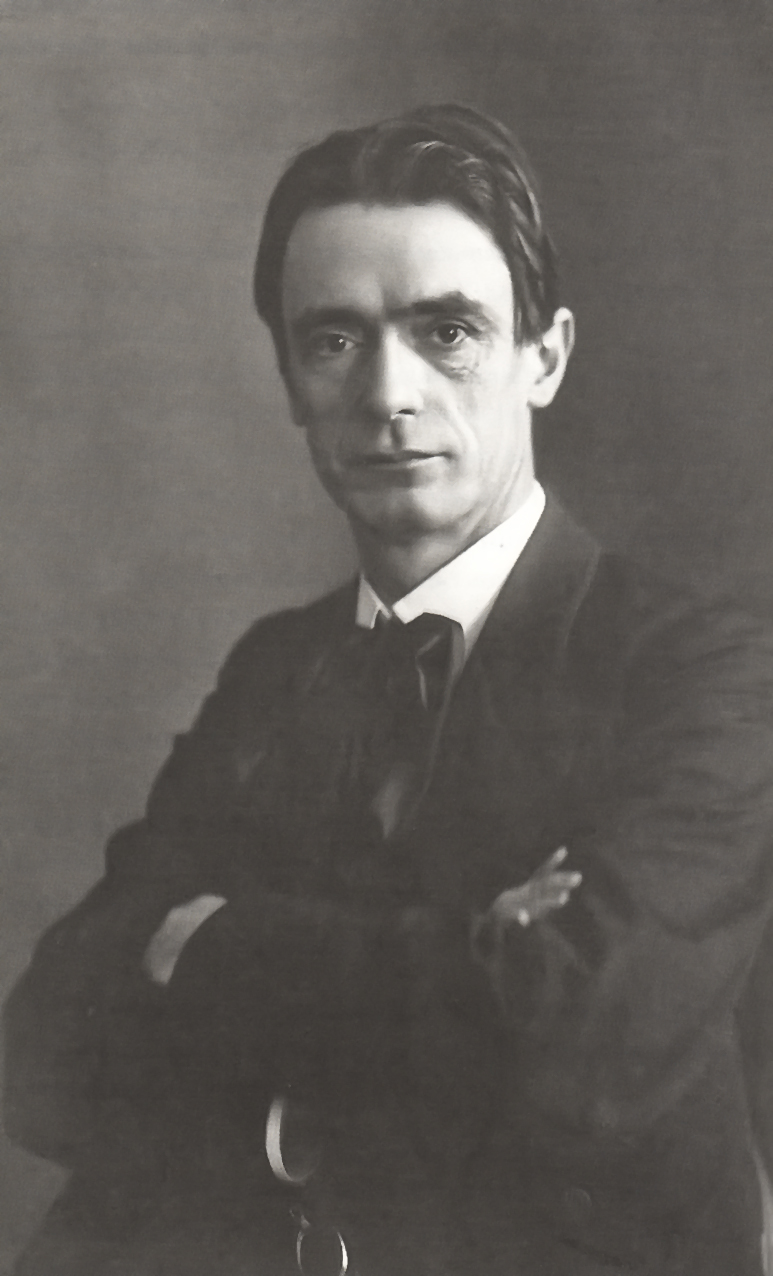
Rudolf Steiner

The first school based upon the ideas of Rudolf Steiner was opened in 1919 in response to a request from Emil Molt, owner and managing director of the Waldorf-Astoria Cigarette Company in Stuttgart, Germany. This is the source of the name Waldorf, which is now trademarked in the United States when used in connection with the educational method. Molt's proposed school would educate the children of employees of the factory. Molt was a follower of Rudolf Steiner, and his movement, anthroposophy, an esoteric spiritual movement based on the notion that an objectively comprehensible spiritual realm exists and can be observed by humans. Many of Steiner's ideas influenced the pedagogy of the original Waldorf school and still play a central role in modern Waldorf classrooms, including reincarnation, karma, the existence of spiritual beings, the idea that children are themselves spiritual beings, and eurythmy.

The co-educational school also served children from outside the factory, including children from across the social spectrum. It was also the first comprehensive school in Germany, serving children of all genders, abilities, and social classes. (Note: Sources for diverse children) At Steiner's behest, the early Waldorf schools were "open to all students, regardless of income. If the parents were unable to pay the full tuition, the remaining amount would be subsidized."

Waldorf education became more widely known in 1922 through lectures Steiner gave at a conference at Oxford University. Two years later, on his final trip to Britain at Torquay in 1924, Steiner delivered a Waldorf teacher training course. The first school in England (Michael Hall) was founded in 1925; the first in the United States (the Rudolf Steiner School in New York City) in 1928. By the 1930s, numerous schools inspired by Steiner's pedagogical principles had opened in Germany, Switzerland, the Netherlands, Norway, Austria, Hungary, the United States, and England.

From 1933 to 1945, political interference from the Nazi regime limited and ultimately closed most Waldorf schools in Europe, with the exception of some British, Swiss, and Dutch schools; the United Kingdom and Switzerland were not occupied by Nazi Germany. A few schools elsewhere in Europe (e.g. in Norway) survived by going underground.

In general, Nazis did not like private schools; however, Rudolf Hess, the adjunct Führer, was a patron of Waldorf schools. According to Karen Priestman, "Although the Anthroposophy Society was prohibited in November 1935 and Reich Education Minister Bernhard Rust forbade all private schools from accepting new students in March 1936, the last Waldorf school was not closed until 1941." This was shortly after Hess flew to England to negotiate peace. The affected schools reopened after the Second World War ended. Some schools in East Germany were re-closed a few years later by the Communist government.

In North America in 1967, there were nine schools in the United States and one in Canada. As of 2021, that number had increased to more than 200 in the United States and over 20 in Canada. (Note: Waldorf schools in US and Canada) There are currently 29 Steiner schools in the United Kingdom and three in the Republic of Ireland.

After the dissolution of the Soviet Union, Waldorf schools again began to proliferate in Central and Eastern Europe. More recently, many have opened in Asia, especially China. There are currently over 1,200 independent Waldorf schools worldwide.

== Developmental approach ==
The structure of Waldorf education follows a theory of childhood development devised by Rudolf Steiner, utilizing distinct learning strategies for each of three developmental stages or "epochs": early childhood, elementary, and secondary education. Steiner believed each stage lasted approximately seven years. (Note: Years per stage) Setting aside their spiritual underpinnings, Steiner's seven-year stages are broadly similar to earlier theories by Comenius and Pestalozzi and later work by Jean Piaget. The stated purpose of this approach is to awaken the "physical, behavioral, emotional, cognitive, social, and spiritual" aspects of each pupil.

=== Early childhood ===
In Waldorf pedagogy, young children learn best through immersion in unselfconscious imitation of practical activities. The early childhood curriculum focuses on experiential education and imaginative play. (Note: Experiential and imaginative) The overall goal of the curriculum is to "imbue the child with a sense that the world is good".

Waldorf preschools employ a regular daily routine that includes free play, artistic work (e.g. drawing, painting or modeling), circle time (songs, games, and stories), outdoor recess, and practical tasks (e.g. cooking, cleaning, and gardening), with rhythmic variations. Rhythm and repetitive patterns are considered important in anthroposophy and are believed to hold spiritual significance. The classroom is intended to resemble a home, with tools and toys usually sourced from simple, natural materials that lend themselves to imaginative play. The use of natural materials has been praised as fulfilling children's aesthetic needs and reinforcing connections to nature, (Note: Aesthetics and nature) though some scholars have questioned whether the preference for natural, non-manufactured materials is truly a "reasoned assessment of twenty-first century children's needs", rather than "a reaction against the dehumanizing aspects of nineteenth-century industrialization".

Pre-school and kindergarten programs generally include seasonal festivals drawn from a variety of traditions, with attention placed on traditions brought forth from the surrounding community. Waldorf schools in the Western Hemisphere have traditionally celebrated Christian festivals, though some North American Waldorf schools also include Jewish holidays.

Waldorf kindergarten and lower grades generally discourage pupils' use of electronic media such as television and computers. There are a variety of reasons for this: Waldorf educators believe that use of these conflicts with young children's developmental needs, media users may be physically inactive, and media may be seen to contain inappropriate or undesirable content and to hamper the imagination.

=== Elementary education ===
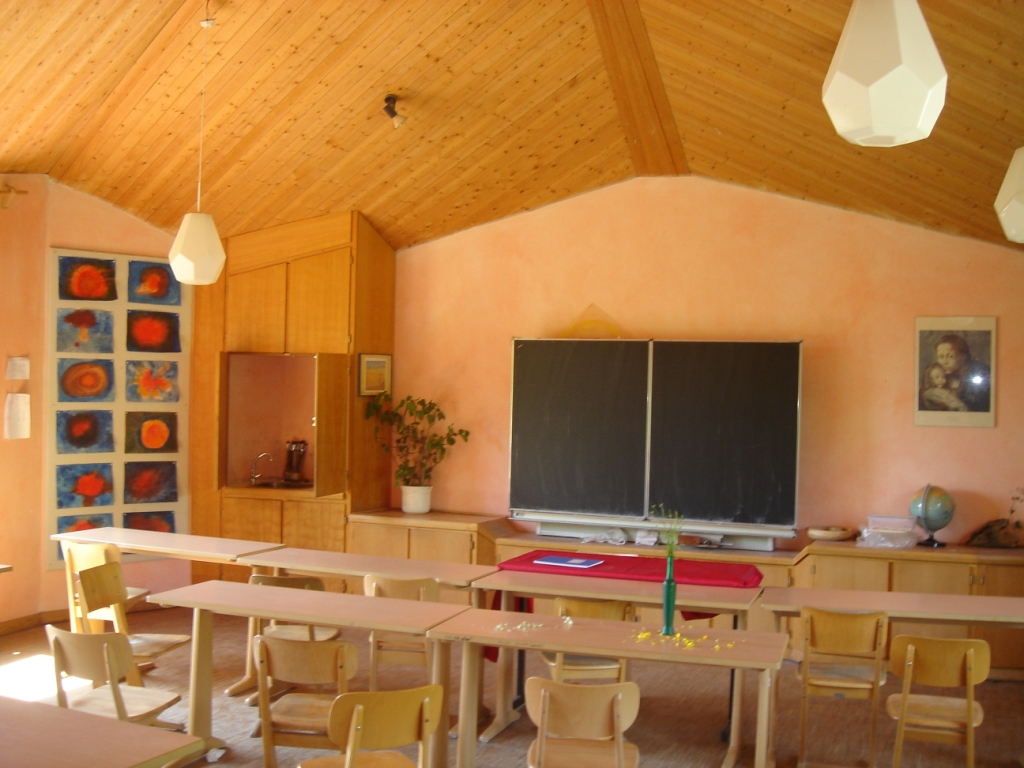
Waldorf elementary school classroom

Waldorf pedagogues consider that readiness for learning to read depends upon increased independence of character, temperament, habits, and memory, one of the markers of which is the loss of the baby teeth. Formal instruction in reading, writing, and other academic disciplines are therefore not introduced until students enter the elementary school, when pupils are around seven years of age. Steiner believed that engaging young children in abstract intellectual activity too early would adversely affect their growth and development.

Waldorf elementary schools (ages 7–14) emphasize cultivating children's emotional life and imagination. In order that students can connect more deeply with the subject matter, academic instruction is presented through artistic work that includes story-telling, visual arts, drama, movement, music, and crafts. The core curriculum includes language arts, mythology, history, geography, geology, algebra, geometry, mineralogy, biology, astronomy, physics, chemistry, and nutrition. The school day generally begins with a one-and-a-half to two-hour, cognitively oriented academic lesson, or "Main lesson", that focuses on a single theme over one month's time. This typically begins with introductory activities that may include singing, instrumental music, and recitations of poetry, generally including a verse written by Rudolf Steiner for the start of a school day. There is little reliance on standardized textbooks.

Waldorf elementary education allows for individual variations in the pace of learning, based upon the expectation that a child will grasp a concept or achieve a skill when he or she is ready. Cooperation takes priority over competition. This approach also extends to physical education; competitive team sports are not introduced until upper grades.

Each class remains together as a cohort throughout all elementary, developing as a quasi-familial social group. In elementary years, a core teacher teaches primary academic subjects. A central role of this teacher is to provide a supportive role model both through personal example and through stories drawn from a variety of cultures, educating by exercising "creative, loving authority". Class teachers are normally expected to teach a cohort for several years, a practice known as looping. Starting in first grade, specialized teachers teach many subjects, including music, crafts, movement, and two foreign languages from complementary language families (in English-speaking countries these are typically German and either Spanish or French).

While class teachers serve a valuable role as personal mentors, establishing "lasting relationships with pupils", Ullrich documented problems when the same teacher continues into middle school. Noting that there is a danger of any authority figure limiting students enthusiasm for inquiry and autonomy, he cited a number of schools where the class teacher accompanies the class for six years only, after which specialist teachers play a greater role.

==== Four temperaments ====
Steiner considered children's cognitive, emotional, and behavioral development to be interlinked. When students in a Waldorf school are grouped, it is generally not by a focus on academic abilities. Instead, Steiner adapted the proto-psychological concept of the classic four temperaments – melancholic, sanguine, phlegmatic, and choleric. Steiner indicated that teaching should be differentiated to accommodate the different needs that these "types" represent. For example, Anthroposophists believe "cholerics are risk takers, phlegmatics take things calmly, melancholics are sensitive or introverted, and sanguines take things lightly". Steiner also believed that teachers must consider their own temperament and be prepared to work with it positively in the classroom, that temperament is emergent in children, and that most people express a combination of temperaments rather than a pure single type. No evidence exists for such "personality types" to be consistent in an individual across time or context, nor that such "types" are useful in providing more effective education.

Today, Waldorf teachers may work with these pseudoscientific "temperaments" to design instruction for each student. Seating arrangements and class activities may take into account the supposed temperaments of students but this is often not described to parents, students, or observers.

=== Secondary education ===
In most Waldorf schools, pupils enter secondary education when they are fourteen years old. Secondary education is provided by specialist teachers for each subject. The curriculum is purported to foster pupils' intellectual understanding, independent judgment, and ethics.

In the third developmental stage (14 years old and up), children are supposed to learn through their own thinking and judgment. Students are asked to understand abstract material and expected to have sufficient foundation and maturity to form conclusions using their own judgment.

The overarching goals are to provide young people the basis on which to develop into free, morally responsible, and creative beings. No independent studies have been published as to whether or not Waldorf education achieves these aims more than any other approach.

== Educational theory and practice ==
The philosophical foundation of the Waldorf approach, anthroposophy, underpins its primary pedagogical goals: to provide an education that enables children to become free human beings, and to help children to incarnate their "unfolding spiritual identity", carried from the preceding spiritual existence, as beings of body, soul, and spirit in this lifetime. Educational researcher Martin Ashley suggests that the latter role would be problematic for secular teachers and parents in state schools, and the commitment to a spiritual background both of the child and the education has been problematic for some committed to a secular perspective.

While anthroposophy underpins the curriculum design, pedagogical approach, and organizational structure, it is explicitly not taught within the school curriculum and studies have shown that Waldorf pupils have little awareness of it. Tensions may arise within the Waldorf community between the commitment to Steiner's original intentions and openness to new directions in education, such as the incorporation of new technologies or modern methods of accountability and assessment. Prominent critics (Note: Such as Klaus Prange, Ehrenhard Skiera, and Heiner Ullrich.) of Waldorf education commonly focus their criticism on its links to anthroposophy. While scholars with more favorable views of Waldorf education point out that Steiner never wanted Waldorf schools to be schools based on anthroposophy as a worldview. Jost Schieren argues that legal frameworks in countries such as Germany, which force Waldorf education to conform to non-anthroposophical standards, and social factors which only allow it to be evaluated according to the standards of empirical education science lead to an environment in which these tensions grow ever larger. Waldorf education can—according to this perspective—only use anthroposophy as a methodical tool, but not as one to derive the contents of its teaching materials; a situation which in essence means a continual and ever-expanding relinquishment of anthroposophy by the field of Waldorf education.

Waldorf schools frequently have striking architecture, employing walls meeting at varied angles (not only perpendicularly). The walls are often painted in subtle colors, often with a lazure technique, and include textured surfaces.

=== Assessment ===
The schools primarily assess students through reports on individual academic progress and personal development. The emphasis is on characterization through qualitative description. Pupils' progress is evaluated through portfolio work in academic blocks and discussion of pupils in teacher conferences. Standardized tests are rare, with the exception of examinations necessary for college entry taken during secondary school years. Letter grades are generally not given until students enter high school. Pupils are not typically asked to repeat years of elementary or secondary education.

=== Curriculum ===
Though Waldorf schools are autonomous institutions not required to follow a prescribed curriculum (beyond what is required by law in a given jurisdiction) there are widely agreed upon guidelines for the Waldorf curriculum.

Main academic subjects are introduced through two-hour morning lesson blocks that last for several weeks. These blocks are horizontally integrated at each grade level in that the topic of the block will be infused into many classroom activities and vertically integrated in that each subject will be revisited with increasing complexity as students develop their skills, reasoning capacities and individual sense of self. This has been described as a spiral curriculum.

Many subjects and skills not considered core parts of mainstream schools, such as art, music, gardening, and mythology, are central to Waldorf education. Students learn a variety of fine and practical arts. Elementary students paint, draw, sculpt, knit, weave, and crochet. Older students build on these experiences and learn new skills such as pattern-making and sewing, wood and stone carving, metal work, book-binding, and doll or puppet making.

Music instruction begins with singing in early childhood and continuing through high school. Pupils also usually learn to play pentatonic flutes, recorders and/or lyres in early elementary grades. Around age 9, diatonic recorders and orchestral instruments are introduced.

Certain subjects are largely unique to the Waldorf schools. Foremost among these is eurythmy, a movement art usually accompanying spoken texts or music which includes elements of drama and dance. Although found in other educational contexts, cooking, farming, and environmental and outdoor education are centrally incorporated into Waldorf curriculum. Other differences include: non-competitive games and free play in younger years as opposed to athletics instruction; instruction in two foreign languages from the beginning of elementary school; and an experiential-phenomenological approach to science. In this method, students observe and depict scientific concepts in their own words and drawings rather than encountering the ideas first through a textbook.

==== Science ====
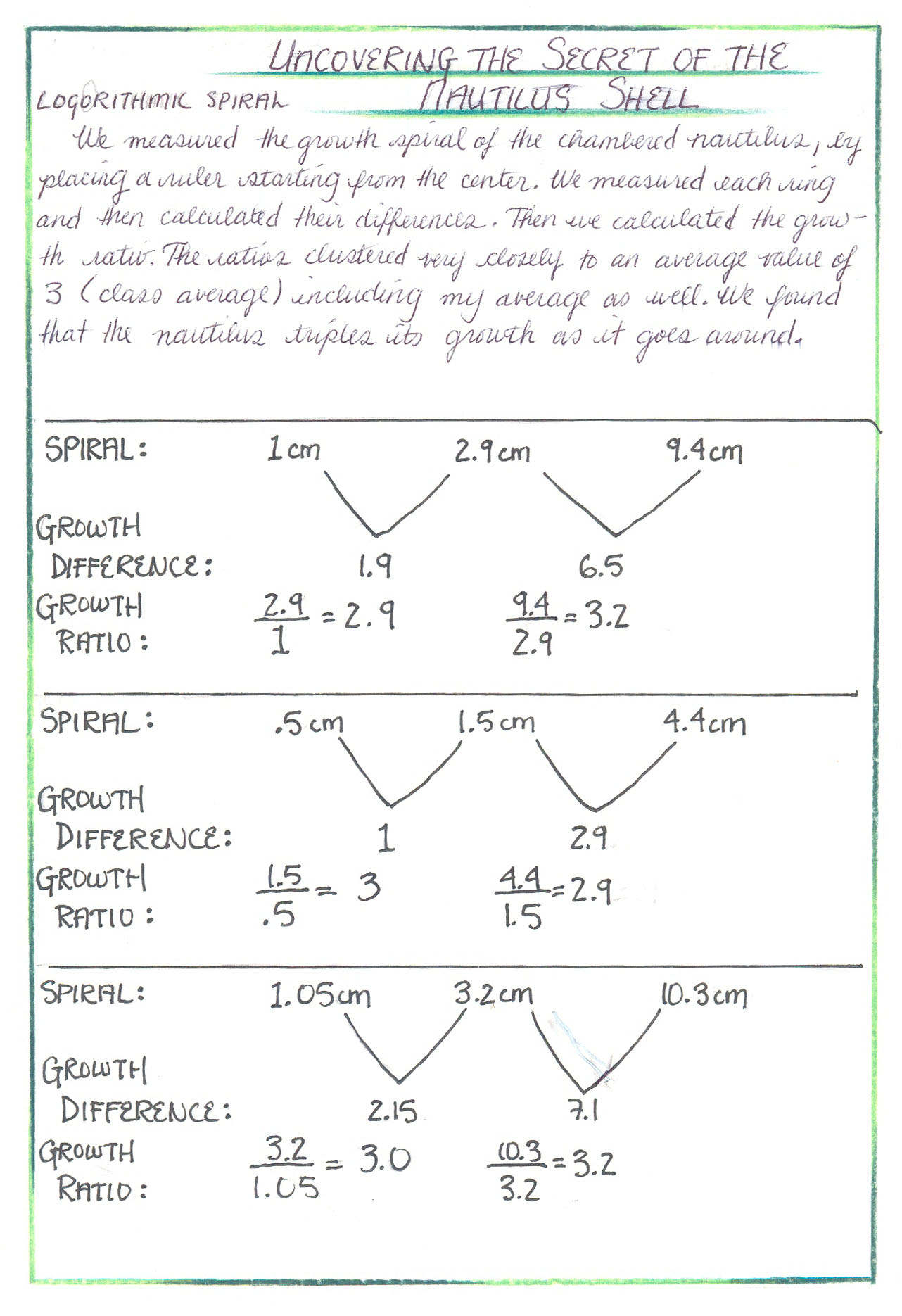
Geometric growth of the nautilus shell – student work

The scientific methodology of modern Waldorf schools utilizes a so-called "phenomenological approach" to science education employing a methodology of inquiry-based learning aiming to "strengthen the interest and ability to observe" in pupils.

Experts have called into question the quality of this phenomenological approach if it fails to educate Waldorf students on basic tenets of scientific fact. The Waldorf approach is said to cultivate students with "high motivation" but "average achievement" in the sciences. One study conducted by California State University at Sacramento researchers outlined numerous theories and ideas prevalent throughout Waldorf curricula that were patently pseudoscientific and steeped in magical thinking. These included the idea that animals evolved from humans, that human spirits are physically incarnated into "soul qualities that manifested themselves into various animal forms", that the current geological formations on Earth have evolved through so-called "Lemurian" and "Atlantean" epochs, and that the four kingdoms of nature are "mineral, plant, animal, and man". All of these are directly contradicted by mainstream scientific knowledge and have no basis in any form of conventional scientific study. Contradictory notions found in Waldorf textbooks are distinct from factual inaccuracies occasionally found in modern public school textbooks, as the inaccuracies in the latter are of a specific and minute nature that results from the progress of science. The inaccuracies present in Waldorf textbooks, however, are the result of a mode of thinking that has no valid basis in reason or logic. This unscientific foundation has been blamed for the scarcity of systematic empirical research on Waldorf education as academic researchers hesitate in getting involved in studies of Waldorf schools lest it hamper their future career.

A Swedish parent wrote a book in 1990 stating that Waldorf schools do not allow questioning the historical accuracy of the Old Testament. Dan Dugan reiterated such criticism in an interview from 2016, accusing Waldorf schools of teaching pseudohistory.

One study of science curriculum compared a group of American Waldorf school students to American public school students on three different test variables. Two tests measured verbal and non-verbal logical reasoning and the third was an international TIMSS test. The TIMSS test covered scientific understanding of magnetism. The researchers found that Waldorf school students scored higher than both the public school students and the national average on the TIMSS test while scoring the same as public school students on the logical reasoning tests. When the logical reasoning tests measured students' understanding of part-to-whole relations, the Waldorf students also outperformed the public school students. The authors of the study noted the Waldorf students' enthusiasm for science, but viewed the science curriculum as "somewhat old-fashioned and out of date, as well as including some doubtful scientific material".

In 2008, Stockholm University terminated its Waldorf teacher training courses. In a statement, the university said "the courses did not encompass sufficient subject theory and a large part of the subject theory that is included is not founded on any scientific base". The dean, Stefan Nordlund, stated "the syllabus contains literature which conveys scientific inaccuracies that are worse than woolly; they are downright dangerous".

==== Information technology ====
Because they view human interaction as the essential basis for younger children's learning and growth, Waldorf schools view computers as being first useful to children in the early teen years, after they have mastered "fundamental, time-honoured ways of discovering information and learning, such as practical experiments and books".

In the United Kingdom, Waldorf schools are granted an exemption by the Department for Education (DfE) from the requirement to teach ICT as part of Foundation Stage education (ages 3–5).

Waldorf schools have been popular with some parents working in the technology sector in the United States, including those from some of the most advanced technology firms. A number of technologically oriented parents from one school expressed their conviction that younger students do not need the exposure to computers and technology, but benefit from creative aspects of the education; one Google executive was quoted as saying "I fundamentally reject the notion you need technology aids in grammar school."

=== Spirituality ===
Waldorf education aims to educate children about a wide range of religious traditions without favoring any single tradition. One of Steiner's primary aims was to establish a spiritual yet nondenominational setting for children from all backgrounds that recognized the value of role models drawn from a wide range of literary and historical traditions in developing children's fantasy and moral imaginations. For Steiner, education was an activity which fosters the human being's connection to the divine and is thus inherently religious.

Waldorf schools were historically "Christian based and theistically oriented", as they expand into different cultural settings they are adapting to "a truly pluralistic spirituality". Waldorf theories and practices are often modified from their European and Christian roots to meet the historical and cultural traditions of the local community. Examples include Waldorf schools in Israel and Japan, which celebrate festivals drawn from these cultures, and classes in the Milwaukee Urban Waldorf school, which have adopted African American and Native American traditions.

Religion classes are typically absent from United States Waldorf schools, but are mandatory in some German federal states, which require teachers who identify with each offered religion to teach such classes in addition to a nondenominational offering. In the United Kingdom, public Waldorf schools are not categorized as "Faith schools". Julian Rivers stated that is by no means easy to tell whether the Steiner schools are religious schools.

Anthony Mellors criticized Waldorf education for presenting itself as supportive of Christian principles, while hiding what he describes as an heretical interpretation of the Bible.

=== Teacher education ===
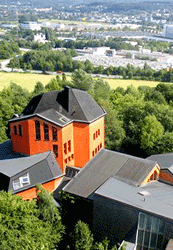
Waldorf teacher training centre in Witten, Germany

Waldorf teacher education programs offer courses in child development, the methodology of Waldorf teaching, academic subjects appropriate to the future teachers' chosen specialty, and the study of pedagogical texts and other works by Steiner. For early childhood and elementary school teachers, the training includes considerable artistic work in storytelling, movement, painting, music, and handwork.

Waldorf teacher education includes social–emotional development as "an integral and central element", which is unusual for teacher trainings. A 2010 study found that students in advanced years of Waldorf teacher training courses scored significantly higher than students in non-Waldorf teacher trainings on three measures of empathy: perspective taking, empathic concern, and fantasy.

== Governance ==
=== Independent schools ===
One of Waldorf education's central premises is that all educational and cultural institutions should be self-governing and should grant teachers a high degree of creative autonomy within the school; this is based upon the conviction that a holistic approach to education aiming at the development of free individuals can only be successful when based on a school form that expresses these same principles. Most Waldorf schools are not directed by a principal or head teacher, but rather by a number of groups, including:

- The college of teachers, who decide on pedagogical issues, normally on the basis of consensus. This group is usually open to full-time teachers who have been with the school for a prescribed period of time. Each school is accordingly unique in its approach, as it may act solely on the basis of the decisions of the college of teachers to set policy or other actions pertaining to the school and its students.
- The board of trustees, who decide on governance issues, especially those relating to school finances and legal issues, including formulating strategic plans and central policies.

There are coordinating bodies for Waldorf education at both the national (e.g. the Association of Waldorf Schools of North America and the Steiner Waldorf Schools Fellowship in the UK and Ireland) and international level (e.g. International Association for Waldorf Education and The European Council for Steiner Waldorf Education (ECSWE)). These organizations certify the use of the registered names "Waldorf" and "Steiner school" and offer accreditations, often in conjunction with regional independent school associations.

=== State-funded schools ===
Independent schools receive complete or partial funding in much of Europe, particularly in Northern and Eastern Europe. Sweden, Finland, Holland, and Slovakia provide over 90% of independent schools' funding, while Slovenia, Germany, Belgium, Luxembourg, Hungary, Estonia, the Czech Republic, Denmark, Spain, and Portugal provide the majority of independent schools' funding. Ireland funds Waldorf schools on the condition that they follow the state curriculum. In countries outside of this region, funding for independent schools varies widely.

=== Homeschooling ===
Waldorf-inspired home schools typically obtain their program information through informal parent groups, online, or by purchasing a curriculum. Waldorf homeschooling groups are not affiliated with the Association of Waldorf Schools of North America (AWSNA), which represents independent schools and it is unknown how many home schools use a Waldorf-inspired curriculum.

Educationalist Sandra Chistolini suggests that parents offer their children Waldorf-inspired homeschooling because "the frustration and boredom some children feel in school are eliminated and replaced with constant attention to the needs of childhood [and] connections between content and the real world".

== Regional differences ==
Some Waldorf schools in English-speaking countries have met opposition due to vaccine hesitancy among parents. In a 2011 article, Waldorf schools were identified as a risk factor for noncompliance with measles vaccination programmes.

Other controversies have centered on Waldorf schools' educational standards and the mystical and antiquated nature of some of Steiner's theories. (Note: Mystical or antiquated)

=== United States ===
The first US Waldorf-inspired public school, the Yuba River Charter School in California, opened in 1994. The Waldorf public school movement is currently expanding rapidly; while in 2010, there were twelve Waldorf-inspired public schools in the United States, by 2018 there were 53 such schools.

Most Waldorf-inspired schools in the United States are elementary schools established as either magnet or charter schools. The first public high school started in 2008 in Sacramento. While these schools follow a similar developmental approach as the independent schools, Waldorf-inspired schools must demonstrate achievement on standardized tests in order to continue receiving public funding. Studies of standardized test scores suggest that students at Waldorf-inspired schools tend to score below their peers in the earliest grades and catch up or surpass their peers by middle school. One study found that students at Waldorf-inspired schools watch less television and spend more time engaging in creative activities or spending time with friends. Public Waldorf schools' need to demonstrate achievement through standardized test scores has encouraged increased use of textbooks and expanded instructional time for academic subjects.

High Mowing School was the first Waldorf high school in the U.S., launched in 1942 in Wilton, New Hampshire. It is the only Waldorf boarding school in the country.

As early as 1959, the International Bureau of Education had stated that anthroposophy is a religion. A legal challenge alleging that California school districts' Waldorf-inspired schools violated the First and Fourteenth Amendments of the United States Constitution and Article IX of the California Constitution was dismissed on its merits in 2005 and on appeal in 2007 and 2012. A 2012 paper in legal science reports this verdict as being provisional, and disagrees with its result, i.e. anthroposophy was declared "not a religion" due to an outdated legal framework. Another author disagrees with the point of that paper. Yet another author agrees with the point of that paper.

=== United Kingdom ===
The first state-funded Steiner-Waldorf school, the Steiner Academy Hereford opened in 2008. Since then, Steiner academies have opened in Frome, Exeter, and Bristol as part of the government-funded free schools programme. The British Humanist Association criticized a reference book used to train teachers in Steiner academies for suggesting that the heart is sensitive to emotions and also promoting homeopathy, while claiming that Darwinism is "rooted in reductionist thinking and Victorian ethics". Edzard Ernst, emeritus professor of complementary medicine at the University of Exeter, said that Waldorf schools "seem to have an anti-science agenda". A United Kingdom Department for Education spokeswoman said "no state school is allowed to teach homeopathy as scientific fact" and that free schools "must demonstrate that they will provide a broad and balanced curriculum".

==== Bristol ====
Bristol Waldorf School

Location
- Redland Hill House, Redland Hill, Bristol, BS6 6UX; England

Information
- Former name: Bristol Steiner School
- Motto: education is a journey not a race
- Established: 1973
- Local authority: City of Bristol
- Department for Education URN: 109345 Tables
- Ofsted: Reports
- Headteacher: Angela Cogan
- Gender: Coeducational
- Age: 3 to 11
- Enrolment: 91
- Website: www.bristolwaldorfschool.org

Bristol Waldorf School is a co-educational Independent primary School located in the town of Redland in Bristol, England. The school was founded as Bristol Steiner School in 1973. In 1999 two pupils at Bristol Waldorf School won top prizes at an art competition held by Amnesty International. In late 2023 it was announced that Bristol Waldorf School was planned to close in early 2024, this did not happen due to a "global fundraising effort". Bristol Waldorf School marked its fiftieth anniversary in 2023.

The 2025 Ofsted report for Bristol Waldorf School rated the school as "Inadequate". In late 2025 it was announced that the board of trustees of Bristol Waldorf School had taken the decision to close in December 2025.

==== Exeter ====
In December 2018, The Office for Standards in Education (Ofsted) judged the Steiner Academy Exeter as inadequate and ordered it to be transferred to a multi-academy trust; it was temporarily closed in October 2018 because of concerns, including significant lapses in safeguarding of students' wellbeing, mistreatment of children with special educational needs and other disabilities, and misspending of funds. In July 2018, two 6-year-old children were found by police having walked out of the Exeter school unnoticed. Their parents were not informed until the end of the day. Subsequently, the Steiner Academies in Bristol and Frome have also been judged inadequate by Ofsted, because of concerns over safeguarding and bullying. A number of private Steiner schools have additionally been judged inadequate in the ensuing investigation. Overall, several Waldorf schools in the UK have closed in the last decade due to their administrations' failure to adhere to state-mandated standards of education (e.g. required levels of literacy, safety standards for child welfare, and mistreatment of children with special educational needs).

==== Frome ====
In November 2012, BBC News broadcast a segment about accusations that the establishment of a state-funded Waldorf School in Frome was a misguided use of public money. The broadcast reported that concerns were being raised about Rudolf Steiner's beliefs, stating he "believed in reincarnation and said it was related to race, with black (schwarz) people being the least spiritually developed, and white (weiß) people the most". In 2007, the European Council for Steiner Waldorf Education (ECSWE) issued a statement, "Waldorf schools against discrimination", which said in part, "Waldorf schools do not select, stratify or discriminate amongst their pupils, but consider all human beings to be free and equal in dignity and rights, independent of ethnicity, national or social origin, gender, language, religion, and political or other convictions. Anthroposophy, upon which Waldorf education is founded, stands firmly against all forms of racism and nationalism."

=== Australia ===
Australia has "Steiner streams" incorporated into a small number of existing government schools in some states; in addition, independent Steiner-Waldorf schools receive partial government funding.

=== New Zealand ===
The majority of Steiner-Waldorf schools in New Zealand are Integrated Private Schools under The Private Schools Integration Act 1975, thus receiving full state funding.

=== Canada ===
In the Canadian provinces of British Columbia, Quebec and Alberta, all private schools receive partial state funding.

=== Russia ===
The first Steiner school in Russia was established in 1992 in Moscow. That school is now an award-winning government-funded school with over 650 students offering classes for kindergarten and years 1 to 11 (the Russian education system is an eleven-year system). There are 18 Waldorf schools in Russia and 30 kindergartens. Some are government funded (with no fees) and some are privately funded (with fees for students). As well as five Waldorf schools in Moscow, there are also Waldorf schools in Saint Petersburg, Irkutsk, Yaroslavl, Kaluga, Samara, Zhukovskiy, Smolensk, Tomsk, Ufa, Vladimir, Voronezh, and Zelenograd. The Association of Russian Waldorf Schools was founded in 1995 and now has 21 members.

=== India ===
The first Waldorf school in India, Sloka, was founded in Hyderabad in 1997, followed by Tridha in Mumbai in 2000. Hyderabad became an early centre for the movement because of its receptive teacher community and openness to alternative education. During the 2000s Waldorf education spread to other cities including Bengaluru, Pune, Nagpur, Delhi–NCR, Coimbatore and Jaipur.

Over time the curriculum has been dovetailed and the approach has been contextualised to Indian languages, festivals and crafts. There are around 28 Waldorf kindergartens in the country and about ten full-fledged Waldorf schools. These include Sloka Waldorf School, Abhaya Steiner School and Prerana Waldorf School in Hyderabad; Tridha School, Inodai Waldorf School and the Golden Spiral Waldorf School in Mumbai; Bangalore Waldorf School in Bengaluru; Yellow Train School in Coimbatore; and Swadhaa Waldorf School in Pune. (Note: Indian Waldorf schools)

The movement's growth led to the formation of organisations and forums that represent and coordinate Waldorf activity in the country. The Anthroposophical Society in India was founded on 21 October 2011 by representatives of Waldorf education, biodynamic farming, curative education, anthroposophical medicine and eurythmy. Sadhana, the Indian Waldorf kindergarten association, was created in 2014 as the national representative of the International Association for Steiner/Waldorf Early Childhood Education (IASWECE).

The Indian Waldorf Education Forum (IWEF) was established in 2017 to connect Indian schools with international bodies such as Friends of Waldorf Education and the Hague Circle, which publish the worldwide lists of Waldorf schools. Since 2005 the Asian Waldorf Teachers' Conference has been held every two years; the 2011 conference in Hyderabad marked a milestone for Indian participation in the regional network.

Today Waldorf and Waldorf-inspired initiatives exist in many Indian states. In Delhi–NCR there are Banyan Earth School and Aarambh Waldorf School; in Gujarat, Shining Spiral Kindergarten; in Bengaluru, Kingdom of Childhood, InBloom, Prakriti, Chiguru, Bangalore Steiner School and Tulasi Kindergarten; (Note: Waldorf initiatives) in Mumbai, Kalpavruksha and Bodhi Vidyalaya; in Nagpur, Nagpur Waldorf-Inspired School; in Pune, Swadhaa learning centre; in Tamil Nadu, The Vels Academy, Pearls Kindergarten, Vedavyas, Indra Dhanu, Lokhaa, Agastya Academy and OHAA School; in Andhra Pradesh, Swechha Waldorf-Inspired School; and in Telangana, Thraya Waldorf-Inspired School. Together these institutions reflect the continuing expansion of Waldorf education in India and its adaptation to diverse cultural settings.

== Social engagement ==
Steiner's belief that all people are imbued with a spiritual core has fuelled Waldorf schools' social mission. The schools have always been coeducational and open to children of all social classes. They were designed from the beginning to be comprehensive, 12-year schools under the direction of their own teachers, rather than the state or other external authorities, all radical principles when Steiner first articulated them.

Social renewal and transformation remain primary goals for Waldorf schools, which seek to cultivate pupils' sense of social responsibility. (Note: Sources about social responsibility) Studies suggest that this is successful; Waldorf pupils have been found to be more interested in and engaged with social and moral questions and to have more positive attitudes than students from mainstream schools, demonstrating activism and self-confidence and feeling empowered to forge their own futures.

Waldorf schools build close learning communities, founded on the shared values of its members, in ways that can lead to transformative learning experiences that allow all participants, including parents, to become more aware of their own individual path, but which at times also risk becoming exclusive. Reports from small-scale studies suggest that there are lower levels of harassment and bullying in Waldorf schools and that European Waldorf students have much lower rates of xenophobia and gender stereotypes than students in any other type of schools. Betty Reardon, a professor and peace researcher, gives Waldorf schools as an example of schools that follow a philosophy based on peace and tolerance.

Many private Waldorf schools experience a tension between these social goals and the way tuition fees act as a barrier to access to the education by less well-off families. Schools have attempted to improve access for a wider range of income groups by charging lower fees than comparable independent schools, by offering a sliding scale of fees, and/or by seeking state support.

=== Intercultural links in socially polarized communities ===
Waldorf schools have linked polarized communities in a variety of settings.

- Under the apartheid regime in South Africa, the Waldorf school was one of the few schools in which children of all apartheid racial classifications attended the same classes. A Waldorf training college in Cape Town, the Novalis Institute, was referenced during UNESCO's Year of Tolerance for being an organization that was working towards reconciliation in South Africa.
- The first Waldorf school in West Africa was founded in Sierra Leone to educate boys and girls orphaned by the country's civil war. The school building is a passive solar building built by the local community, including the students.
- In Israel, the Harduf Kibbutz Waldorf school includes both Jewish and Arab faculty and students and has extensive contact with the surrounding Arab communities. It also runs an Arab-language Waldorf teacher training. A joint Arab-Jewish Waldorf kindergarten (Ein Bustan) was founded in Hilf (near Haifa) in 2005. An Arabic language multi-cultural Druze/Christian/Muslim Waldorf school has operated in Shefa-'Amr since 2003. In Lod, a teacher training program brings together Israeli Arabs and Jews on an equal basis, with the goals of improving Arab education in Israel and offering new career paths to Arab women.

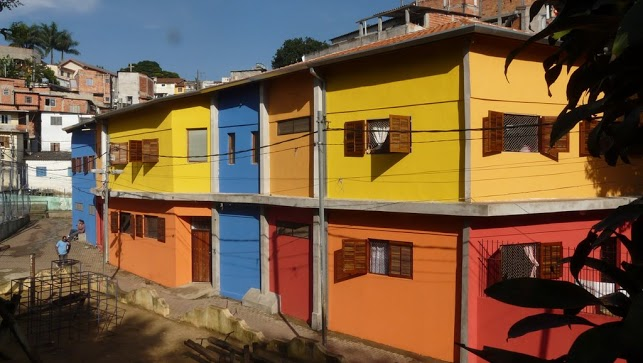
A ten kindergarten complex in Associação Comunitária Monte Azul

- In Brazil, a Waldorf teacher, Ute Craemer, founded Associação Comunitária Monte Azul, a community service organization providing childcare, vocational training and work, social services including health care, and Waldorf education to more than 1,000 residents of poverty-stricken areas (Favelas) of São Paulo.
- In Nepal, the Tashi Waldorf School in the outskirts of Kathmandu teaches mainly disadvantaged children from a wide variety of cultural backgrounds. It was founded in 1999 and is run by Nepalese staff. In addition, in the southwest Kathmandu Valley a foundation provides underprivileged, disabled and poor adults with work on a biodynamic farm and provides a Waldorf school for their children.
- The T.E. Mathews Community School in Yuba County, California, serves high-risk juvenile offenders, many of whom have learning disabilities. The school switched to Waldorf methods in the 1990s. A 1999 study of the school found that students had "improved attitudes toward learning, better social interaction and excellent academic progress". This study identified the integration of the arts "into every curriculum unit and almost every classroom activity" as the most effective tool to help students overcome patterns of failure. The study also found significant improvements in reading and math scores, student participation, focus, openness and enthusiasm, as well as emotional stability, civility of interaction and tenacity.

In 2008, 24 Waldorf schools in 15 countries were members of the UNESCO Associated Schools Project Network. The Friends of Waldorf Education is an organization whose purpose is to support, finance and advise the Waldorf movement worldwide, particularly in disadvantaged settings.

== Reception ==
=== Anti-cult ===
The French government anti-cult agency MIVILUDES reported in 2021 that it remains vigilant about anthroposophy, particularly because of its deviant medical applications and its work with minors (Waldorf pedagogy).

A French author defined it accordingly as a "mystical pedagogy belonging to the New Age".

Waldorf schools consider critical thinking unsuitable for children, while Steiner considered it unsuitable for spiritual people.

=== Evaluations of students' progress ===
Although studies about Waldorf education tend to be small-scale and vary in national context, a 2005 independent comprehensive review of the literature concluded there was evidence that Waldorf education encourages academic achievement as well as "creative, social and other capabilities important to the holistic growth of a person".

In comparison to state school pupils, European Waldorf students are significantly more enthusiastic about learning, report having more fun and being less bored in school, view their school environments as pleasant and supportive places where they are able to discover their personal academic strengths, and have more positive views of the future. Twice as many European Waldorf students as state school pupils report having good relationships with teachers; they also report significantly fewer ailments such as headaches, stomach aches, and disrupted sleep.

A 2007 German study found that an above-average number of Waldorf students become teachers, doctors, engineers, scholars of the humanities, and scientists. Studies of Waldorf students' artistic capacities found that they averaged higher scores on the Torrance Test of Creative Thinking Ability, drew more accurate, detailed, and imaginative drawings, and were able to develop richer images than comparison groups.

Some observers have noted that Waldorf educators tend to be more concerned to address the needs of weaker students who need support than they are to meet the needs of talented students who could benefit from advanced work.

=== Educational scholars ===
Professor of educational psychology Clifford Mayes said "Waldorf students learn in sequences and paces that are developmentally appropriate, aesthetically stimulating, emotionally supportive, and ecologically sensitive." Professors of education Timothy Leonard and Peter Willis stated that Waldorf education "cultivates the imagination of the young to provide them a firm emotional foundation upon which to build a sound intellectual life".

Professor of education Bruce Uhrmacher considers Steiner's view on education worthy of investigation for those seeking to improve public schooling, saying the approach serves as a reminder that "holistic education is rooted in a cosmology that posits a fundamental unity to the universe and as such ought to take into account interconnections among the purpose of schooling, the nature of the growing child, and the relationships between the human being and the universe at large", and that a curriculum need not be technocratic, but may equally well be arts-based.

Thomas Nielsen, assistant professor at the University of Canberra's education department, said that imaginative teaching approaches used in Waldorf education (drama, exploration, storytelling, routine, arts, discussion and empathy) are effective stimulators of spiritual-aesthetic, intellectual and physical development, expanding "the concept of holistic and imaginative education" and recommends these to mainstream educators.

Andreas Schleicher, international coordinator of the PISA studies, commented on what he saw as the "high degree of congruence between what the world demands of people, and what Waldorf schools develop in their pupils", placing a high value on creatively and productively applying knowledge to new realms. This enables "deep learning" that goes beyond studying for the next test. Deborah Meier, principal of Mission Hill School and MacArthur grant recipient, while having some "quibbles" about the Waldorf schools, stated: "The adults I know who have come out of Waldorf schools are extraordinary people. That education leaves a strong mark of thoroughness, carefulness, and thoughtfulness."

Robert Peterkin, director of the Urban Superintendents Program at Harvard's Graduate School of Education and former Superintendent of Milwaukee Public Schools during a period when Milwaukee funded a public Waldorf school, considers Waldorf education a "healing education" whose underlying principles are appropriate for educating all children.

Waldorf education has also been studied as an example of educational neuroscience ideas in practice.

Heiner Ullrich remarked about Waldorf pedagogy: "fruitful practice based on a dubious theory". He also stated that if Waldorf pedagogy succeeded, that is because it is in many ways lacking originality. Deep inside it is based upon pedagogical theories of others, which were already popular in Steiner's era. Ullrich later made clear that Steiner's pedagogy is based upon Austrian Herbartianism. Zander agrees.

==== Germany ====
In 2000, educational scholar Heiner Ullrich wrote that intensive study of Steiner's pedagogy had been in progress in educational circles in Germany since about 1990 and that positions were "highly controversial: they range from enthusiastic support to destructive criticism". In 2008, the same scholar wrote that Waldorf schools have "not stirred comparable discussion or controversy... those interested in the Waldorf School today... generally tend to view this school form first and foremost as a representative of internationally recognized models of applied classic reform pedagogy" and that critics tend to focus on what they see as Steiner's "occult neo-mythology of education" and to fear the risks of indoctrination in a worldview school, but lose an "unprejudiced view of the varied practice of the Steiner schools". Ullrich himself considers that the schools successfully foster dedication, openness, and a love for other human beings, for nature, and for the inanimate world.

Professor of Comparative Education Hermann Röhrs describes Waldorf education as embodying original pedagogical ideas and presenting exemplary organizational capabilities.

=== Relationship with mainstream education ===
A UK Department for Education and Skills report suggested that Waldorf and state schools could learn from each other's strengths: in particular, that state schools could benefit from Waldorf education's early introduction and approach to modern foreign languages; combination of block (class) and subject teaching for younger children; development of speaking and listening through an emphasis on oral work; good pacing of lessons through an emphasis on rhythm; emphasis on child development guiding the curriculum and examinations; approach to art and creativity; attention given to teachers' reflective activity and heightened awareness (in collective child study for example); and collegial structure of leadership and management, including collegial study. Aspects of mainstream practice which could inform good practice in Waldorf schools included: management skills and ways of improving organizational and administrative efficiency; classroom management; work with secondary-school age children; and assessment and record keeping.

American state and private schools are drawing on Waldorf education – "less in whole than in part" – in expanding numbers. Professor of Education Elliot Eisner sees Waldorf education exemplifying embodied learning and fostering a more balanced educational approach than American public schools achieve. Ernest Boyer, former president of the Carnegie Foundation for the Advancement of Teaching commended the significant role the arts play throughout Waldorf education as a model for other schools to follow. Waldorf schools have been described as establishing "genuine community" and contrasted to mainstream schools, which have been described as "residential areas partitioned by bureaucratic authorities for educational purposes".

Many elements of Waldorf pedagogy have been used in all Finnish schools for many years.

Ashley described seven principal ways Waldorf education differed from mainstream approaches: its method of working from the whole to the parts, its attentiveness to child development, its goal of freedom, the deep relationships of teachers to students, the emphasis on experiencing oral traditions, the role of ritual and routine (e.g. welcoming students with a handshake, the use of opening and closing verses, and yearly festivals), the role arts and creativity play, and the Goetheanistic approach to science.

Benjamin Lazier calls Steiner a "maverick educator".

=== Public health ===
Steiner is also known for bizarre statements such as "knitting produces strong teeth" or "overstimulating intelligence produces dwarfism". That is why Waldorf schoolchildren are knitting and crocheting.

==== Vaccine beliefs ====
In US states where nonmedical vaccine exemption is legal, 2015 reports showed Waldorf schools as having a high rate of vaccine exemption within their student populations, however, recent research has shown that in US state schools, child immunization rates often fall below the 95-percent threshold that the Centers for Disease Control say is necessary to provide herd immunity for a community. (Note: Herd immunity) A 2010 report by the UK Government said that Steiner schools should be considered "high risk populations" and "unvaccinated communities" with respect to children's risks of catching measles and contributing to outbreaks. On 19 November 2018, the BBC reported there was an outbreak of chickenpox affecting 36 students at the Asheville Waldorf School located in North Carolina. Out of 152 students at the school, 110 had not received the Varicella vaccine that protects against chickenpox. The United States Advisory Committee on Immunization, the Centers for Disease Control, and the North Carolina Department of Health and Human Services all recommend that all healthy children 12 months of age and older get vaccinated against Varicella. The Guardian reported that several Waldorf schools in California had some of the lowest vaccination rates among kindergarten pupils in the 2017–18 school year, with only 7% of pupils having been vaccinated in one school. In the same article, however, The Guardian also reported that, in a 2019 statement, the International Center for Anthroposophic Medicine and the International Federation of Anthroposophic Medical Associations stressed that anthroposophic medicine, the form of medicine Steiner founded, "fully appreciates the contributions of vaccines to global health and firmly supports vaccinations as an important measure to prevent life threatening diseases".

Rudolf Steiner founded the first Waldorf school several years before vaccinations for tetanus, diphtheria, and whooping cough were invented. After such vaccinations became widespread in Europe, Steiner opposed their use in several contexts, writing that vaccination could "impede spiritual development" and lead to a loss of "any urge for a spiritual life". Steiner also thought that these effects would carry over into subsequent reincarnations of the vaccinated person.

The Association of Waldorf Schools of North America released the following in a statement in 2019:

The Association of Waldorf Schools of North America wishes to state unequivocally that our educational objectives do not include avoidance of, or resistance to, childhood immunization. The health, safety, and wellbeing of children are our forefront concerns.

- All members of our association are schools or institutions that are free to make independent school policy decisions in accordance with AWSNA's membership and accreditation criteria. Our membership and accreditation criteria require schools to be compliant with national, state, provincial, and local laws. While policy decisions regarding immunizations may vary from school to school, such decisions are made in accordance with legal requirements set by local, state, provincial or federal government.
- The Association encourages parents to consider their civic responsibility in regards to the decision of whether or not to immunize against any communicable disease, but ultimately, the decision to immunize or not is one made by parents in consultation with their family physician.

In 2021, Waldorf schools in Germany were associated with outbreaks of COVID-19 during a pandemic of the disease, as well as reticence to incorporate public health measures relating to disease outbreak.

=== Race ===
The Association of Waldorf Schools of North America (AWSNA) and European Council for Steiner Waldorf Education have put out statements stating that "racist or discriminatory tendencies are not tolerated in Waldorf schools or Waldorf teacher training institutes. The Waldorf school movement explicitly rejects any attempt to misappropriate Waldorf pedagogy or Rudolf Steiner's work for racist or nationalistic purposes." Similar statements were put out by the Waldorf school association in Britain ("Our schools do not tolerate racism. Racist views do not accord with Steiner's longer term vision of a society in which such distinctions would be entirely irrelevant & modern Steiner Waldorf schools deplore all forms of intolerance, aiming to educate in a spirit of respect & to encourage open-hearted regard for others among the children they educate") and Germany.

These statements are the necessary response to Rudolf Steiner's contradictory beliefs about race: he emphasized the core spiritual unity of all the world's peoples, sharply criticized racial prejudice, and articulated beliefs that the individual nature of any person stands higher than any racial, ethnic, national or religious affiliation, yet he asserted a hierarchy of races, with the white race at the top, and associated intelligence with having blonde hair and blue eyes. People who believe in reincarnation may not see his beliefs as racist in the same way as people who do not.

In 2019 a school in Christchurch, New Zealand, began considering removing "Rudolf Steiner" from the name of the school "so that the our best ideals are not burdened by historical, philosophical untruths." In 2014, after an investigation by the NZ Ministry of Education, a small school on the Kāpiti Coast of New Zealand was cleared of teaching racist theories. An independent investigation concluded that while there were no racist elements in the curriculum, the school needed to make changes in the "areas of governance, management and teaching to ensure parents' complaints were dealt with appropriately in the future ... [and that] ... the school must continue regular communication with the school community regarding the ongoing work being undertaken to address the issues raised and noted that the board has proactively sought support to do this."

Racist attitudes and behaviour have been reported in particular Waldorf schools, and some teachers have reportedly expressed Steiner's view that individuals reincarnate through various races, however, Kevin Avison, senior advisor for the Steiner Waldorf Schools Fellowship in the UK and Ireland, calls the claim of belief in reincarnation through the races "a complete and utter misunderstanding" of Steiner's teachings.

"Steiner's collected works, moreover, totalling more than 350 volumes, contain pervasive internal contradictions and inconsistencies on racial and national questions." Martins and Vukadinović describe the racism of Anthroposophy as spiritual and paternalistic, in contrast to the materialistic and often malign racism of fascism.

== See also ==
- Forest school
- Montessori education
- Outdoor education
