= Waldorf-Astoria-Zigarettenfabrik =

German tobacco company

The Waldorf-Astoria-Zigarettenfabrik (English:Waldorf-Astoria Cigarette Factory) was a German tobacco company, established in Hamburg and Stuttgart by Emil Molt and several other partners on January 1, 1906. It was named after Johann Jakob Astor, born in 1763 in Walldorf (in present-day Baden-Wurttemberg), who after emigrating to the United States became the richest man in said country.

The company proved successful; it employed around 1,000 people in 1919. However, it experienced difficulties in the second half of the 1920s due to outdated production-methods and the global economic situation, and a competing trust took over a large portion of the shares. In 1929, the company was liquidated. The Waldorf-Astoria tobacco brand, with the portrait of John Jacob Astor, was taken over by a different company and is owned as of 2018 by Reemtsma.

Waldorf-Astoria became famous for giving its name to Waldorf education. On September 7, 1919, Emil Molt established the first Waldorf school in cooperation with Rudolf Steiner. It was a school in Stuttgart for the children of the Waldorf-Astoria employees, and based upon Steiner's ideas.
