= Kabareh Cheikhats =

Kabareh Cheikhats كابريه الشيخات
- Origin: Casablanca, Morocco
- Genres: aita, chaabi

Kabareh Cheikhats (Arabic: كابريه الشيخات) is a Moroccan chaabi (folk music) cabaret theatrical performance by the troupe Jouk Attamtil Al Bidaoui (جوق التمثيل البيضاوي "The Casablancan Acting Troupe"), a troupe based out of Casablanca, Morocco.

In the performance, led by Ghassan El Hakim, male actors play the roles of women, paying homage to the shaykhāt, popular female entertainers such as Fatna Bent Lhoucine or Haja Hamounia, and the chaabi Moroccan folk tradition.

== History ==
Kabareh Cheikhats is the continuation of a project Ghassan El Hakim originally began as a theater workshop in 2014. Upon returning to Casablanca from his studies in Paris, El Hakim founded with his friends La Parallèle, an art school and theater group. The Kabareh Cheikhats project was originally conceived as a theater piece about men who wanted to become shaykhāt (شيخات): female entertainers who would perform folk songs and dances at weddings and other events—a popular social institution in Morocco. The play was never written, however.

Instead, the project became a performance. Beginning in May 2016, a troupe of eleven comedians began performing Kabareh Cheikhats. They were performing twice a month in the basement of Le Vertigo, a bar in downtown Casablanca. By October 2017, over 40 performances, in both private and public settings. The troupe—Jouk Attamtil Al Bidaoui—began performing in cities around Morocco and held a number of international engagements as well, including in France, Belgium, and the UK.

On March 4, 2018, Kabareh Cheikhats performed on stage with Haim Botbol at Casablanca's Federation Oeuvres Laiques (FOL) theater.

== Style ==
The troupe performs a repertoire of Aita, a folk style associated with the countryside of Morocco. Famous names of Aita include Kharboucha, Zohra al-Fassia or Bouchaib Al Bidaoui, as well as Hadda Ouakki, who sings chaabi and Atlas Amazigh musical styles.
