= Arubis =

Rural Arab subgroup in Morocco

ʿArubis
العروبية
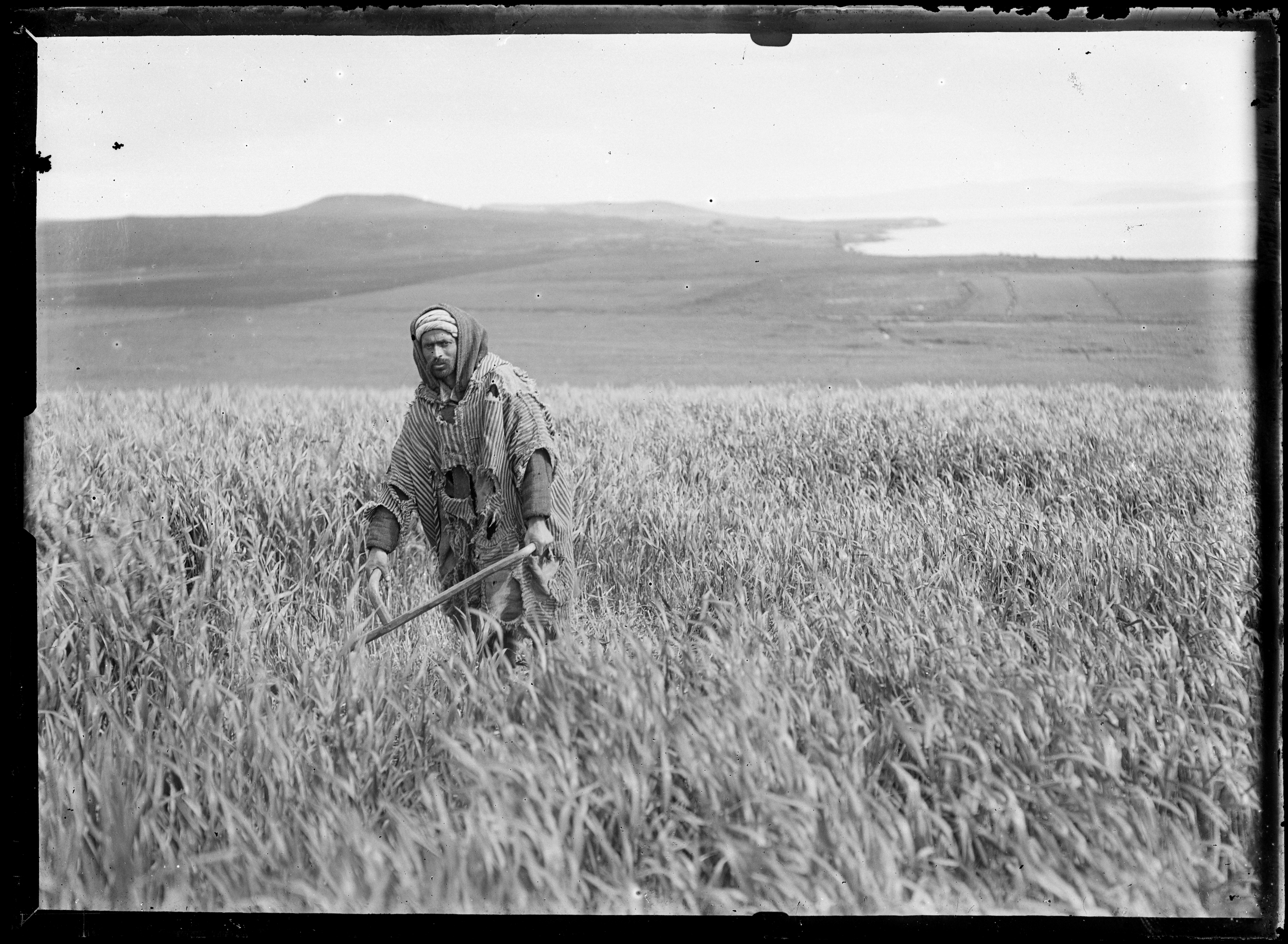
- Farmer from Chaouia holding a scythe

Regions with significant populations
- Western plains of Morocco (including Chaouia, Doukkala, Chiadma, Gharb, Abda, Tadla, Zaër, Haouz)

Languages
- Western Morocco Arabic

Religion
- Sunni Islam

Related ethnic groups
- Other Arabs, Berbers

Arubis (Arabic: العروبية, romanized: al-ʿArūbīya) (Note: singular Arabic: عروبي, romanized: ʿarūbī, lit. 'Bedouin', also transliterated as ʕṛūbi, ζroubi and aroubi) are an Arab subgroup referring to the rural inhabitants of the western Atlantic plains of Morocco and their descendants. They are believed to descend from Bedouin Arab tribes who migrated into the region in the 12th century. The term ʿarūbī has recently become polysemous also carrying the meaning of "ruralite" or "countryman".

== Names and etymology ==
The Arabic term ʿarūbī literally means "Bedouin" and derives from the word ʿarbī meaning Arab. According to the Moroccan scholars Ahmed Ech-charfi and Lamyae Azzouzi, the term ʿarūbī was probably coined around the time Bedouin tribes in North Africa arrived in the eleventh century. They argue that it was probably coined with a negative connotation reflecting the negative attitudes by those who coined it: early Arab settlers and their Berber allies.

In recent years, the term ʿarūbī has also adopted the meaning of "ruralite" or "countryman". Ech-charfi and Azzouzi argued that words like ʿarubī in Morocco adopted its rural meaning in Moroccan Arabic due to contact with Western language and Western colonization. They argue that in French there is a clear contrast between the city and countryside in the vocabulary and in the social attitudes communicated through the use of the terms used by the French. They also suggest that the term possibly could have acquired this rural meaning first in the major cities of the Atlantic plains like Casablanca. Although, this would need more research to substantiate.

Arubis have also been referred to simply as ʿArab and ʾAʿrāb (transl. Bedouins).

== History ==
=== Origins and Almohad era ===
During the 10th and 11th centuries, the Banu Hilal tribal confederation migrated from Egypt to Ifriqiya. They were also joined by the Banu Sulaym. Both of these tribal confederations were part of the northern Adnanite group of Arab tribes. In the Battle of Haydaran, they defeated the Zirids decisively and also sacked Kairouan. The Zirids and the Hammadids were forced to retreat to other cities. The traditional narrative picked up by many chroniclers like Ibn Khaldun was that the Banu Hilal was sent by the Fatimids to punish the Zirids for their insubordination. Many modern historians now reject this narrative as a piece of propaganda that the Fatimids constructed capitalising on the victories of the Banu Hilal to bolster their own image. The effect that the Hilalian migration had on North Africa is a source of controversy. The traditional view is that the Hilalian migration marked the triumph of nomadism over civilisation. However, this view has been challenged by recent studies. For example, the French historian Jean Poncet argued that the Zirids already had been weakened by internal factors before while the French Marxist historian Claude Cahen argues that the Hilalian migration was part of a wider decentralization and “bedouinisation” in the 10th and 11th centuries which affected the entire Islamic World.

When the Almohads went east, they came into contact with the Arab tribes of Banu Hilal and Banu Sulaym. The Arabs felt threatened by the Almohad expansion fearing that the Almohads would expel them from the Central Maghrib so they formed a force to fight against them. However, they were defeated at the Battle of Setif and their goods, animals and families were taken to Maghrib al-Aqsa. Despite the Almohads holding their wives and children captive, the Almohads did not sell their families into slavery but instead used them to entice the Arabs to join the Almohads. The Almohads invited the Arabs to Marrakesh to reunite with their families and when they did arrive, they were showered with gifts and told to return with their families to the Eastern Maghrib. The Almohad ruler Abd al-Mumin claimed a Qaysi Arab lineage which would have included the Banu Hilal and Banu Sulaym (both Qaysi tribes). This was an effective propagandistic tactic used to rally them to the Almohad side.

In order to weaken Arab resistance in the east, Abd al-Mumin transferred them to Morocco specifically in the Atlantic plains of Morocco. This region was previously inhabited by the Barghawata but was depopulated by the Almohads. Without the Almohad recruitment of Arabs and resettling into the Atlantic plains, Morocco would have avoided the rural Arabisation that came with the Hilalian migrations into the Maghreb. The appearance of the Arabs added to the complexity of the ethnic population of Morocco and introduced a significant non-Berber element. The Berbers who had previously inhabited the Atlantic plains were either Arabised or displaced to nearby mountains. There was also a significant amount of Arab and Berber intermarriage which led to the spread of Arabic language and realignment of tribal structures. The Almohad caliph Yaqub al-Mansur also transferred some Maqil tribes from the Eastern Maghrib to the Atlantic plains. Ibn Khaldun recorded the distribution of Arab tribes in Maghrib al-Aqsa after their resettlement in the Kitab al-Ibar:

Tribe	Location
Banū Riyāḥ	Northwestern Morocco in the coastal plain between Tangier and Salé
Jusham (Khulṭ, Banū Jābir, and Sufyān)	Fertile plain of Tāmasnā
Some clans of the Athbaj	Fertile plain of Tāmasnā

The Arab tribes became integrated into the Almohad army. One of the reasons for the recruitment of the Arabs was the need for their military service in Al-Andalus. They formed the most important contingents in the Almohad military in Ifriqiya, al-Andalus and the provinces and they were used on a regular basis in larger military expeditions within the empire. They were prized as cavalry in particular with their signature tactic being karr wa farr (attack and retreat). Due to their military value, they had a higher salary than other members of the Almohad military.

They increasingly played an important role in the politics of the Almohad Empire. Arabs became embedded in the Almohad elite to the point that they became partners in giving the bay‘a to a new caliph. One of the motives for the recruitment and resettlement of the Arabs was to counterbalance the power of the original Almohad tribes belonging to the Masmuda. Abd al-Mumin was an outsider and sought to create a hereditary caliphate. Due to the Arabs being outsiders, Abd al-Mumin could count on their loyalty to him and he used them to ensure the succession of his son. When the Almohads declined in the 1220s, the Arabs played an important part in the civil wars and succession disputes that emerged. With the decline of the Almohad army, the Arabs became the most powerful force in the Moroccan plains.

=== Marinid, Saadi and Alaouite era ===
Under the Marinids, the Arabs grew in importance in Morocco. Due to the lack of Zenata supporters, they welcomed the support of Arab nomads, like the Khlut and Sufyan. The Zenata were heavily assimilated into Arab culture and the Marinid makhzan (government) was composed of both Arabs and Zenata Berbers. This led to the further expansion of Arab tribes into Morocco where they settled in the plains with Berber groups increasingly Arabised. Under the Marinids, Arabic became both the common and official language. The Marinids, as Arabophiles, encouraged the spread of Arab culture by incorporating Arab cultural practices into their court and family traditions and by marrying the daughters of Arab leaders like prominent sharifs and Bedouin leaders from noble clans like the Banū Muhalhal of the Khlut. The Marinids claimed descent from the Arab tribe of Mudar. They like the Almohads also carried out tribal transfers with the most important being the transfer of the Sufyan from Tamasna to the Gharb. Furthermore, they encouraged the Bani Ahsan to leave the Ziz valley in return for the right to collect taxes over a wide region extending from Sijilmassa to Tadla. From the fifteenth century onward, they would continue migrating until they reached the Atlantic coast.

By the year 1500, Arab pastoralists made up three quarters of the population and dominated four fifths of the land area of Dukkala. The American scholar Vincent Cornell estimates the Arab pastoralist population of Dukkala at 375,000 at this time. According to the historical author Leo Africanus, by the 16th century, the Gharb was entirely populated by the Khlut.

From the 16th century, Morocco saw the rise of two Arab dynasties of Sharifian descent: the Saadis and the Alaouites. These dynasties managed to gain power through support from allied Arab tribes. The Saadis mainly received support from Maqil Arabs from the Draa valley and the Anti-Atlas. They used these tribes to counter Hilalian groups. The Alaouites got support from Arab and Berber tribes in the Tafilalt and Angad.

Ismail ibn Sharif of the Alaouite dynasty recruited Arab tribes from the Sahara as well as using Maqil groups inherited from the Saadians for his army. The four makhzen tribes that formed the guich tribes in Morocco were the Sharāga (Awlād Djamaʿ, Hawwāra, Banū ʿĀmir, Banū Snūs, Sedjʿa, Aḥlāf, Swīd, etc.), the Sharārda (Shabana, Zirāra, Awlād Djarār, Ahl Sūs, Awlād Mṭāʿ, etc.), the Udāya (the Udāya proper, Mgafra etc.) and Bwākher (Black Guard). After Ismail ibn Sharif died, the guich tribes became king makers. In the span of 31 years from 1726 to 1757, they deposed, enthroned and slayed 14 sultans. This was until Moulay Ismail's grandson Muhammad ibn Abdallah managed to keep these tribes under control by reducing their power. For example, to counterbalance the power of the Sharārda in Tadla and the plain of Marrakesh, he recruited sections from local tribes into the makhzan like the Mnābeha, Rḥāmna, ʿAbda, Aḥmar and Harbil. Each of these tribes had to send two qaids to the guich. Muhammad ibn Abdallah weakened the Udāya and the Black Guard by reducing them to small corps (down to 15,000 for the Black 1,000 for the Udāya). This fell further by the time of Moulay Sliman. Sliman aimed to reverse this by recruiting the Sharaga and Oulad Jama and strengthening the Udāya to counter the Black Guard. In 1808, the army was evaluated at 36,000 men. The decline of the Udāya and Black Guard meant that tribal reserves, both Arab and Berber, became more important.

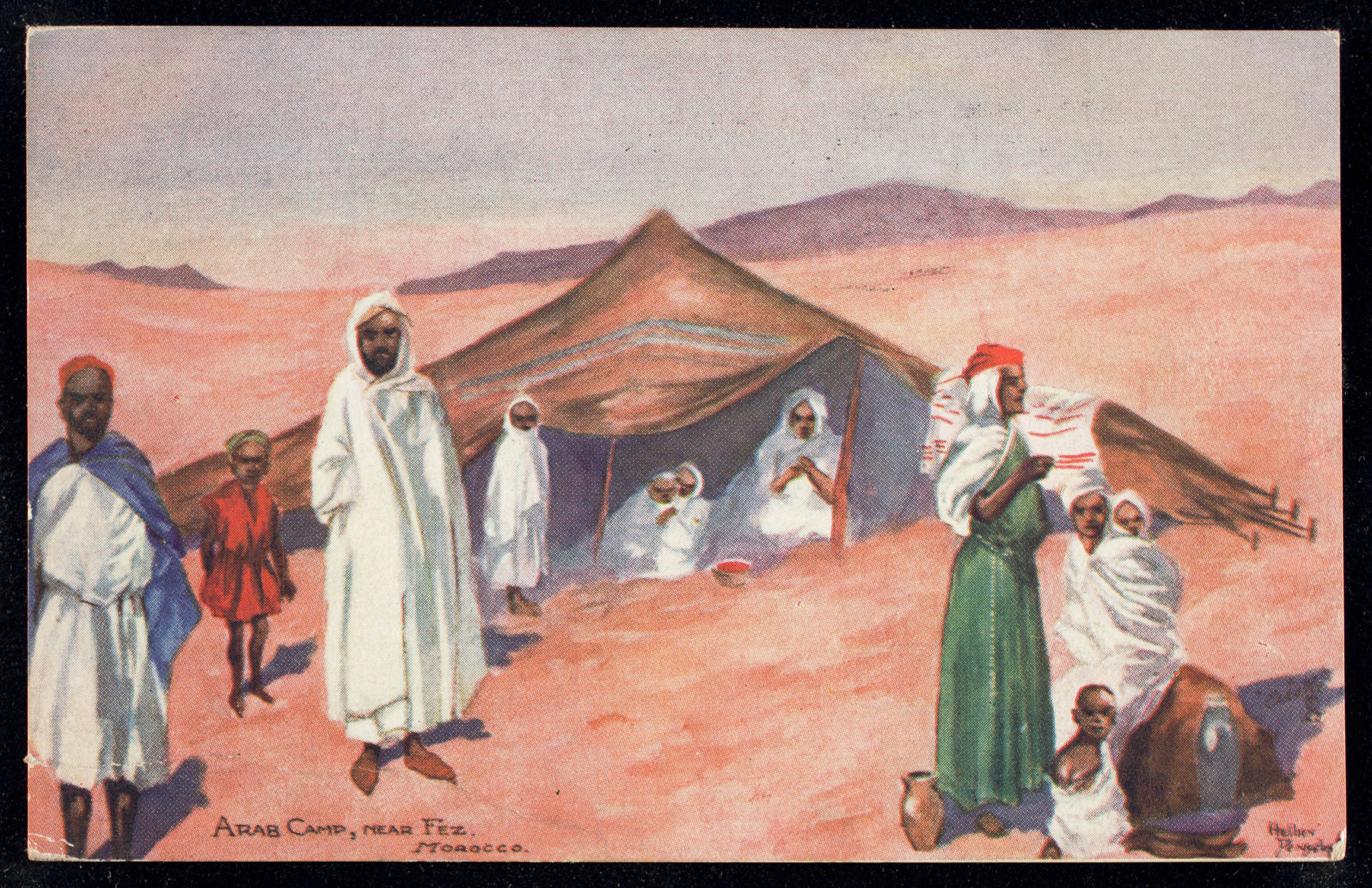
Arab Camp near Fez, Morocco c. 1903

Large Arab tribal confederations like the Chaouia and Beni Ahsen were able to mobilise 30,000 or 40,000 men. According to the Moroccan historian Abu al-Qasim al-Zayyani, in total, the Arab tribes of the plain were able to mobilise 150,000 men. This was despite the low population density of the Atlantic plains. The Chaouia, Dukkala and Abda regions were known as the granaries of the empire and in 1813, the British ambassador William à Court described the Gharb as "perhaps the finest cornland in the world".

=== 20th and 21st century ===
From 1907 to 1908, due to French incursions, the Chaouia tribes attacked French settlements leading to what became known as the Chaouia campaign. Various factors led up to this. One was the growth of the new port Casablanca (9,000 in 1884 to 25,000 in 1907). Most migrants into Casablanca were from the surrounding Chaouia region. Although, some were from the Dukkala and Tadla and even the first few from the Sous. In this period, the dialects of Casablanca and the surrounding Chaouia region shared the same rural features. This expansion also transformed the relationship between the cities and the tribe. Due to a lack of a solid and cultured merchant class like in other major cities nor an influential group of ulama or sharifs able to oversee the city, European powers were able to dominate the city. In the end of 1902, Chaouia qaids were summoned by Abd al-Aziz to park in fighting the Bou Hmara rebellion. With their absence, groups of rebellious peasants, the jawqa, assembled to overthrow the local makhzan government. This began among the Oulad Bou Ziri and the Oulad Bou Said tribes then spread.

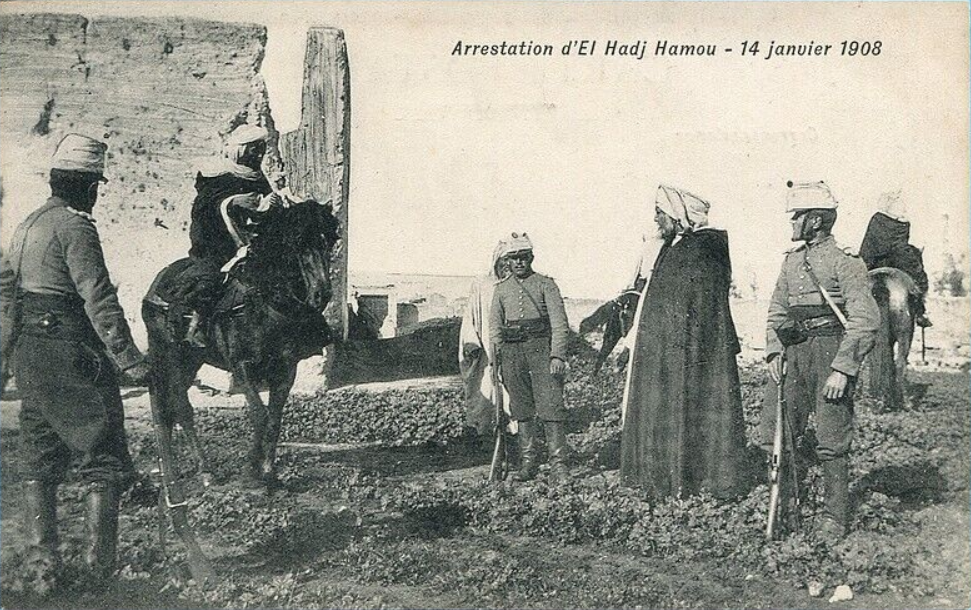
The arrest of Hajj Hamu, 14 January 1908

The jawqa was rather coordinated. The rebels grouped themselves in bands of 10 to 30 horsemen with each having their own individual leader. To maintain internal discipline, these rebels took an collective oath binding the heads of the jawqa. The goal of the jawqa was the destruction as qasbahs in Chaouia and the ransom of wealthy prisoners. According to the historian Edmund Burke III, this was not a rising of the poor but a rising of a new class of rural notables opposed to an encroaching central government.

This rebellion also gave the chance for families who were subordinated to get rid of their rivals. The two most notable figures of the rebellion were Abū Azzāwi and Ḥajj Muḥammad Wuld al-Ḥajj Ḥāmū. Abu Azzawi (whose real name was Muhammad ibn Taibi) was a sharif from the Mzab tribe. After returning from his studies in Fes, Abu Azzawi became a rival of the Sharifs of Boujaad and also was an opponent of Moulay Abd al-Aziz. Hajj Hamu was the nephew of the governor of the Oulad Hariz and leader of the Rimā'īya tariqa. After the revolt he took up the leadership of the Oulad Hariz. Despite his ambitions for governership of the Chaouia, Abd al-Aziz chose the elderly and lackluser Abu Bakr ibn Abu Zayd from Salé. This sparked a succession crisis with most tribes backing Hajj Hamu. In the spring of 1906, the pretender and older brother of Abd al-Aziz, Abd al-Hafid, held a series of talks in Marrakesh with Abu Azzawi telling him that the time for holy war was imminent and the tribes of the Chaouia should prepare. Abd al-Hafid was also inducted into the Rimā'īya tariqa.

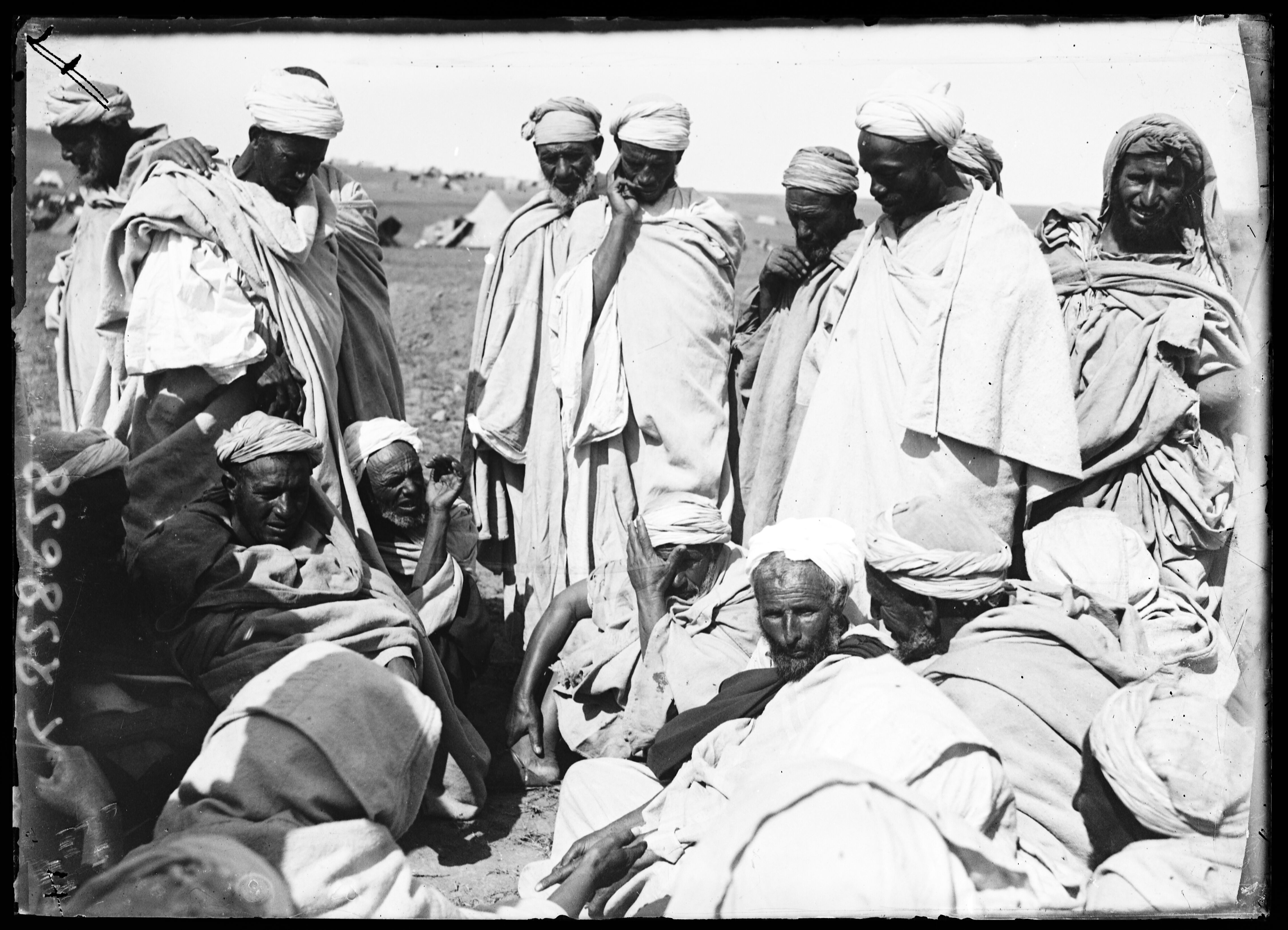
Men of the Beni Amir forced to submit after the fighting at Kasba Tadla, 1913

What finally caused the Chaouia campaign was on 30 July 1907 when tribesmen attacked Europeans in Casablanca which led to a 2000 man French expeditionary force by General Drude. The Chaouia campaign led to the Hafidiya. After fighting broke out in Chaouia, the Chaouia tribes held several assemblies resulting in a letter sent to Abd al-Hafid urging him to intervene and "restore Islam from the low estate into which it had fallen". In response to this letter, Abd al-Hafid with the backing of the ulama and notables convened to appoint him sultan. Before doing so, Abd al-Hafid gave a brief statement in which he discussed the suffering of the Chaouia (his mother upon hearing this cried as she was from the region).

In 1911, a number of tribes, both Arab (Bani Ahsan, Shararda and Oudaya) and Berber, took part in a conspiracy planning, on Mawlid, to kidnap the sultan, Abd al-Hafid, kill his viziers and wage jihad on his behalf. This rebellion broke out early because of a premature rebellion among the Shararda and eventually started supporting a new pretender, Mawlay Zayn, the brother of Abd al-Hafid. In 1912, both Arab (Hyayna and Sharaga) and Berber tribes participated in the 1912 siege of Fes. This was partly under the leadership of a sharif Muhammad al-Hajjami from the Jaʿia tribe. According to Edmund Burke III, these tribes had "limited objectives, were well-organised, and adopted a quite pragmatic strategy aimed at cutting the French off from the coast and defeating them piecemeal".

"Morocco Riots Terror Mounts In Revolt Of Arabs". Universal Newsreel, 21 July 1955

According to the political writer Marvine Howe, after the exile of Sultan Mohammed V, "The nationalist movement, with its political leadership silenced, turned to violence, and the Moroccan resistance was reborn". This turn to violence was through urban terrorism. These terrorist attacks included things like arson, shootings, knifings, sabotage, stonings and bomb explosions. The urban resistance launched 4,520 violent attacks targeting infrastructure in Moroccan cities, mostly Casablanca, between 20 August 1953 and 6 April 1956. There were also terrorist bombings and attempted assassinations against the French colon community. According to the historian William A. Hoisington Jr, between December 1953 and March 1955, there were 1222 terrorist (and counter-terrorist) attacks mostly in Casablanca (dubbed "Morocco's Chicago") which claimed 259 deaths and 732 wounded. The historian Susan Gilson Miller says "violent attacks became a daily occurrence". The high presence of French settlers was a factor that affected nationalist violence. Morocco had the second largest settler population in the French empire. Under the French protectorate, Casablanca functioned as a "focal point" for European settlers, mostly of French origin, to migrate to. By 1950, Casablanca had a population of 158,000 Europeans as opposed to 414,500 Muslims and 72,000 Jews.

The resistance was initially mostly urban until the Oued Zem massacre on 20 August 1955 by Sma'la tribesmen where it then shifted to the bled (the countryside). An estimated 60–100 Europeans had died along with many more pro-French Moroccans. The disproportionate French response to the riots that emerged after the massacre involving disproportionately killing Moroccans using jet aircraft, tanks and artillery led to the Moroccan population being enraged further eventually leading up to independence.

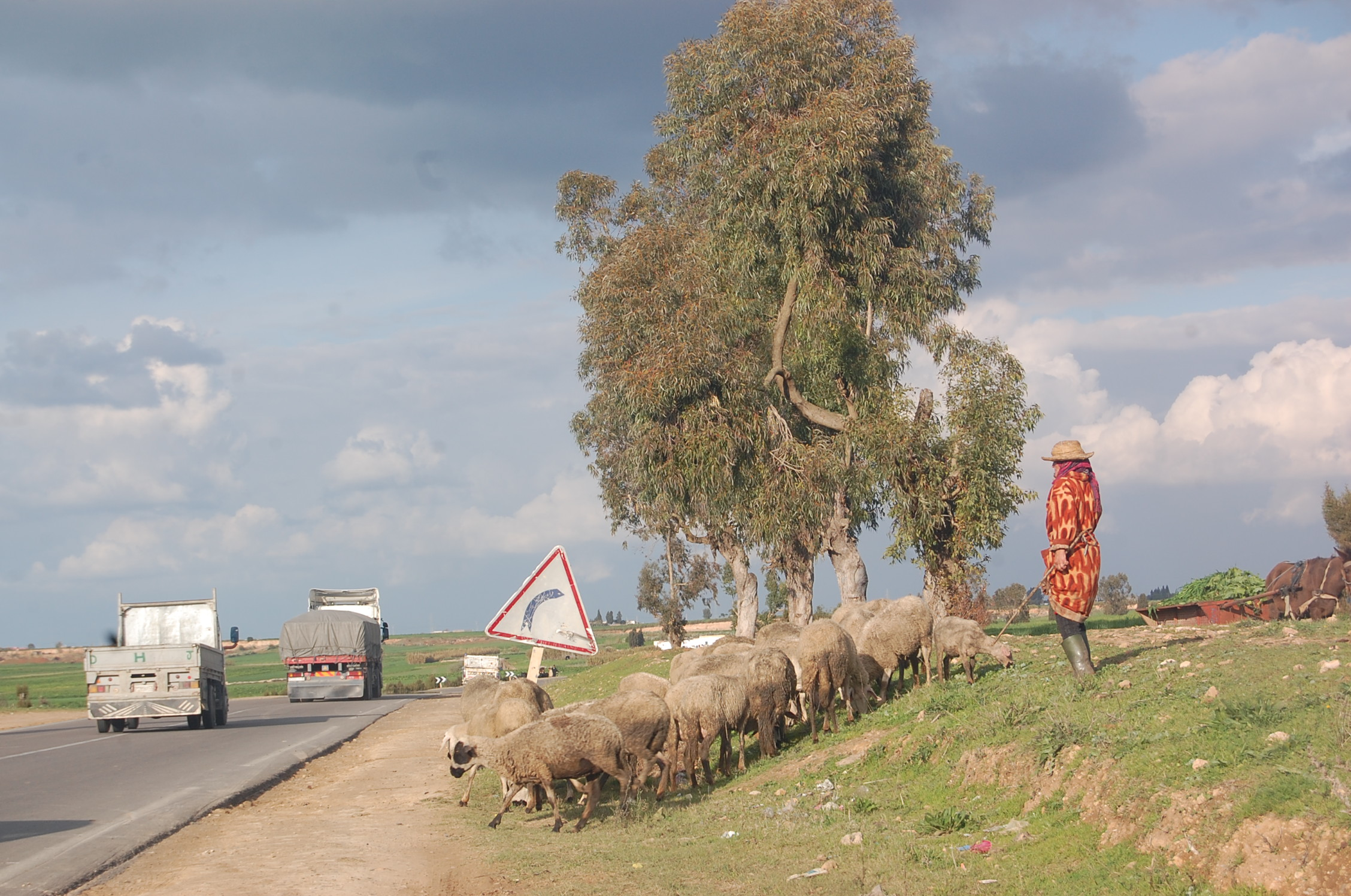
Shepherdess from Dukkala

Arubis today make up the largest population in modern Casablanca. The Chaouia and Dukkala regions remain the most important agricultural regions in Morocco.

== Culture ==
=== Clothing ===
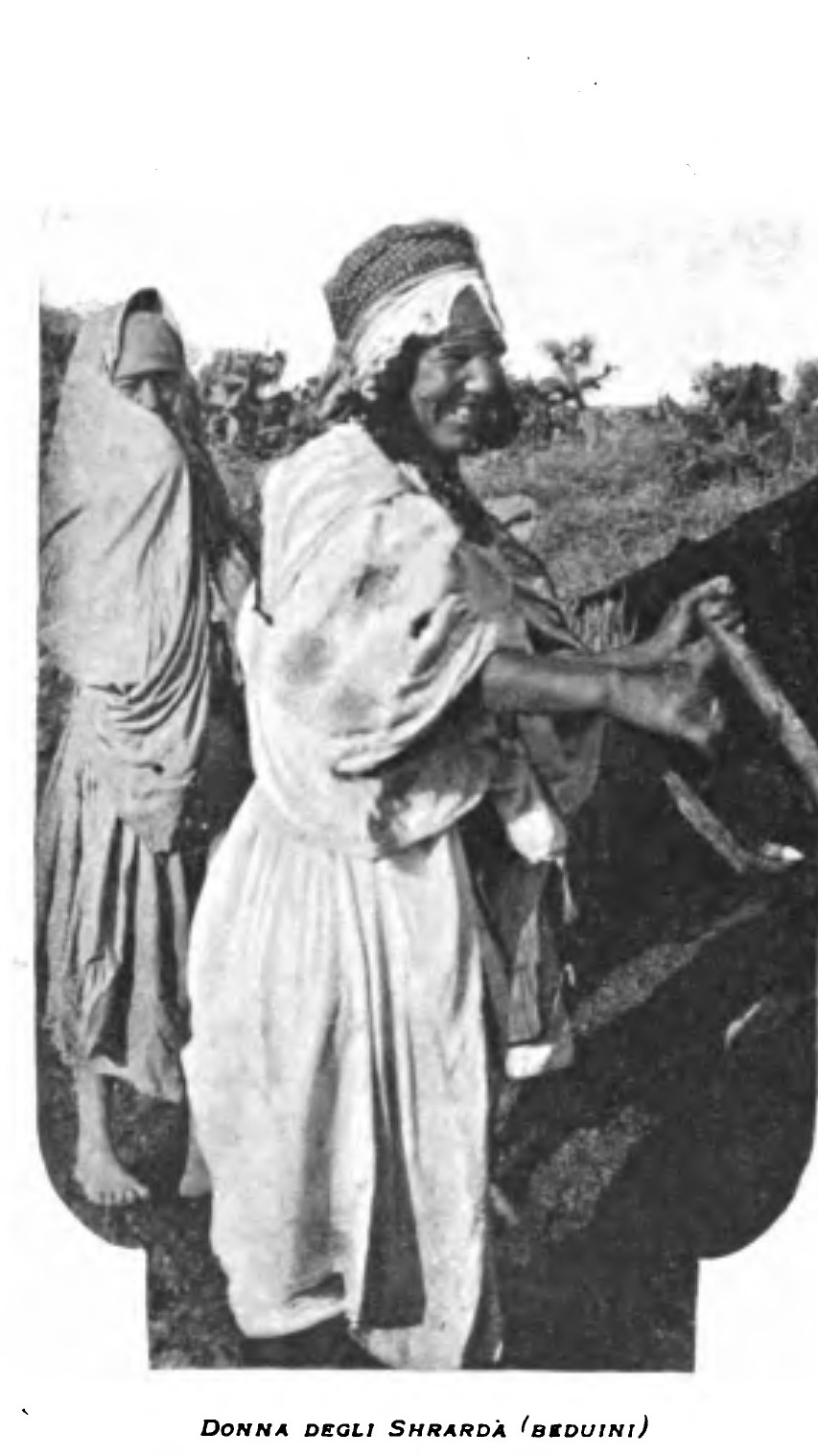
Woman from the Shararda

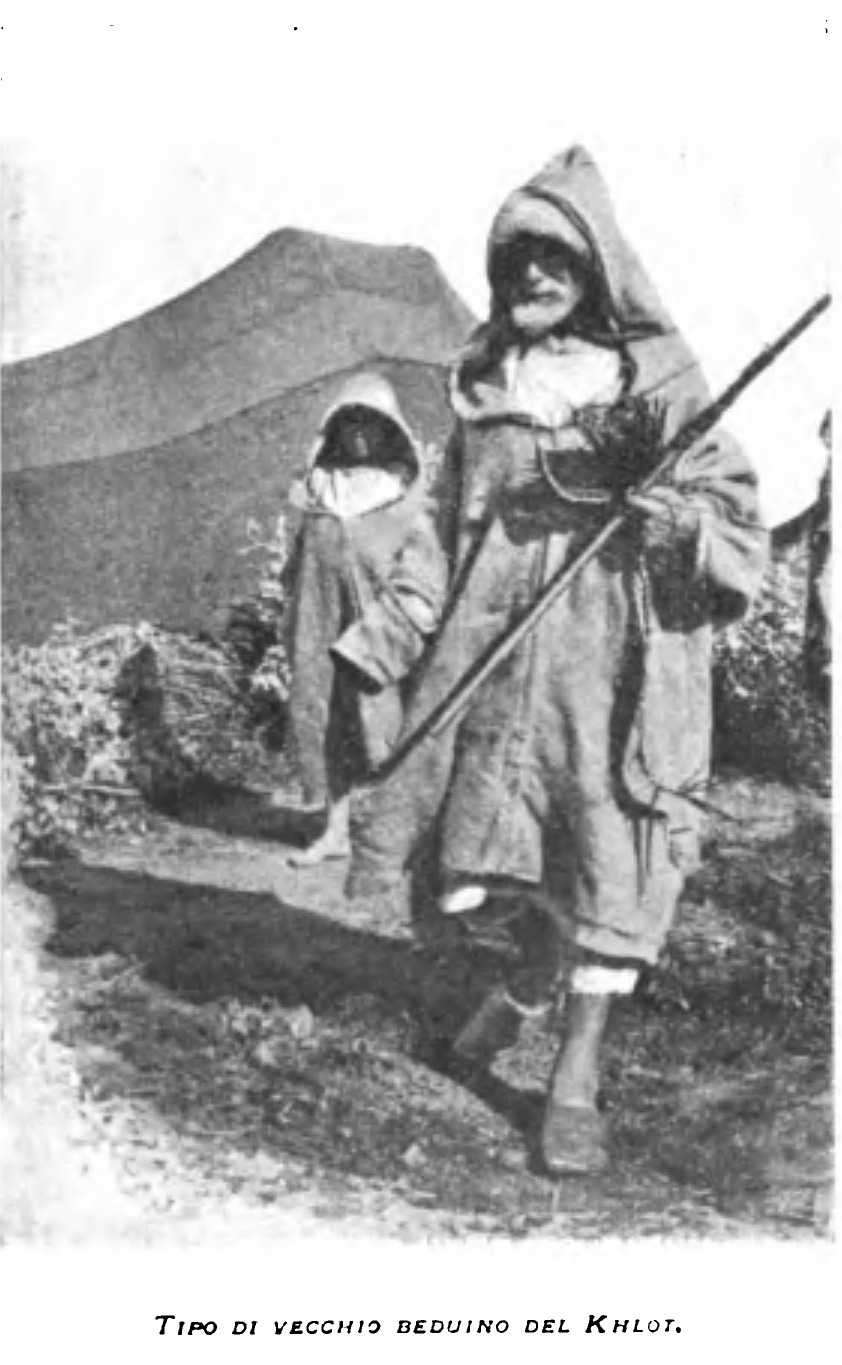
Old Bedouin man from Khlut

According to Jean Besancenot, the clothing of the Atlantic plains was heavily influenced by nearby urban areas. Traditionally, both genders wore the hayk, also known properly and historically according to colonial-era French sociologist Edmond Doutté, as the ksa. The hayk is a long piece of white wool roughly 6.5 metres long and 4 metres wide often worn directly against the skin. In the Chaouia region, the hayk is striped and made up of broads bands of colour with red and orange being the most dominant.

At the beginning of the 20th century, men wore, alongside the hayk, the qashshaba, a long white wool or cotton shirt with or without sleeves and without a belt. It is fastened on either side of the neck. Wealthier men wore the tchamir, a long white cotton shirt with sleeves and a stand up collar. By then though, the jellaba, a sewn coat with short sleeves and a hood, became increasingly popular. Besancenot noted in the 1980s that well-of men would wear the jellaba and salham. On the other hand, the everyday dress of labourers, farmers and herdsmen would be the qashshaba or a short plain tunic of course wool known as the tchamir or kmidja. Traditionally, breeches and trousers were not worn but they became gradually adopted. On their head, Arubis wore the turban (rezza) while poorer people wrapped their head with a camel hair cord. A copper ring was worn on the right ear and grown men would grow their beards and shave their heads. The balgha was worn for visits to the market and town while shepherds would wear sandals called the refafes.

Facial tattoos of women belonging to various Atlantic plains tribes

According to Besancenot, the clothing of women is influenced by Berber clothing and elements of urban clothing. Women, historically, wore the lizar, a piece of white cotton fabric. It was held in place by two copper or silver fibulae (katiat) and a belt (ḥazam). Their hairstyle was made up of two large braids (grun lit. 'horns') extended by dark-wool hairpieces which was common in Northern Morocco and urban areas. Similarly, adornments like jewellery were also similar except in details. Historically, tattooing was common.

=== Language ===
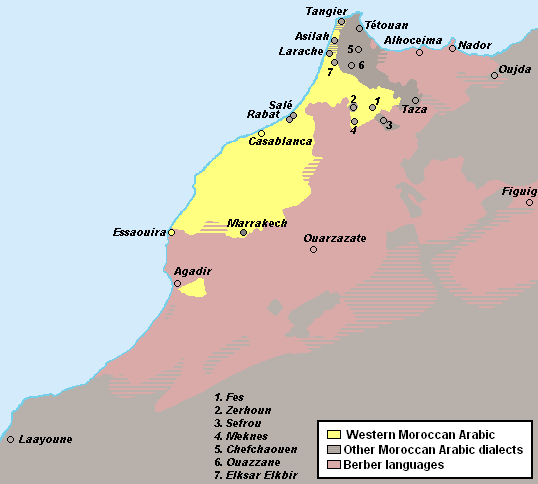
Distribution of the Arubi dialect (yellow)

The dialect spoken in the Atlantic plains has been referred to as Arubi. This dialect is a Hilalian dialect. This dialect is influenced by Berber in vocalism and it has a robust quality. It is characterised by certain features:

- The consonant qaf, generally pronounced qa, becomes ga
- The short diphthongs aw and ay are pronounced u and i, respectively
- Short vowels usually merge as schwa ə
- The extensive use of syncope with clusters of up to three consonants, as in nktəb, instead of nəktəb (I write)
- The assimilation of nt in tt, ft in tt, and nd in dd
- Consonants at the ends of words are not followed by a vowel; this gives the impression of a rough or brusque ending
- Stress on the penultimate syllable of a word
- Gender merged in the second- and third-person plural
- Feminization of the second-person singular
- Words not being clearly enunciated but rather pronounced indistinctly, with a sort of throaty or guttural enunciation

The Moroccan Arabic koine that emerged in the last century is based of the Bedouin dialects of the Atlantic coast. This new koine is socially dominant and is used in popular singing, in theatre and cinema, in radio and TV announcements and most notably in publicity marketing.

=== Falconry ===
Falconry
- UNESCO Intangible Cultural Heritage
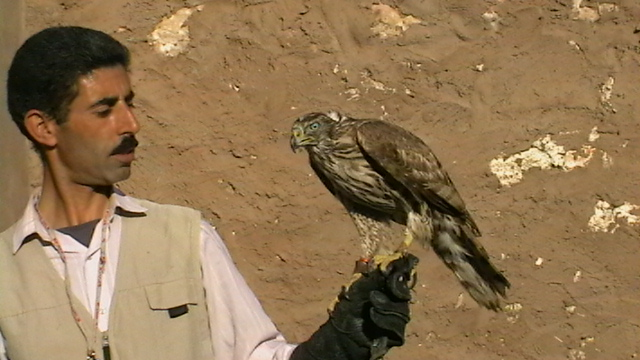
- Falconer from the Qwassem tribe, Dukkala
- Country: Morocco
- Reference: 01708
- Region: Arab States

Inscription history
- Inscription: 2021 (14th session)
- List: Representative

In the Dukkala region, falconry is practiced. This was originally brought over through the migration of Arab tribes like Banu Hilal into the region.

It is practiced today by the Qwassem tribe in the Ouled Amran and Smaala villages.

=== Music ===
Chaabi is commonly associated with the culture of the Arubi as opposed to the Fassi (lit. 'from Fez', but also including anyone who adopts an elitist culture), who prefer Andalusian music and the malhun.

Aita (lit. 'cry') is a genre of sung poetry found in the Atlantic plains. It is typically by female singers and sometimes male singers. It was brought over by the Arab tribes like the Banu Hilal who migrated into Morocco in the twelfth century.

=== Housing ===
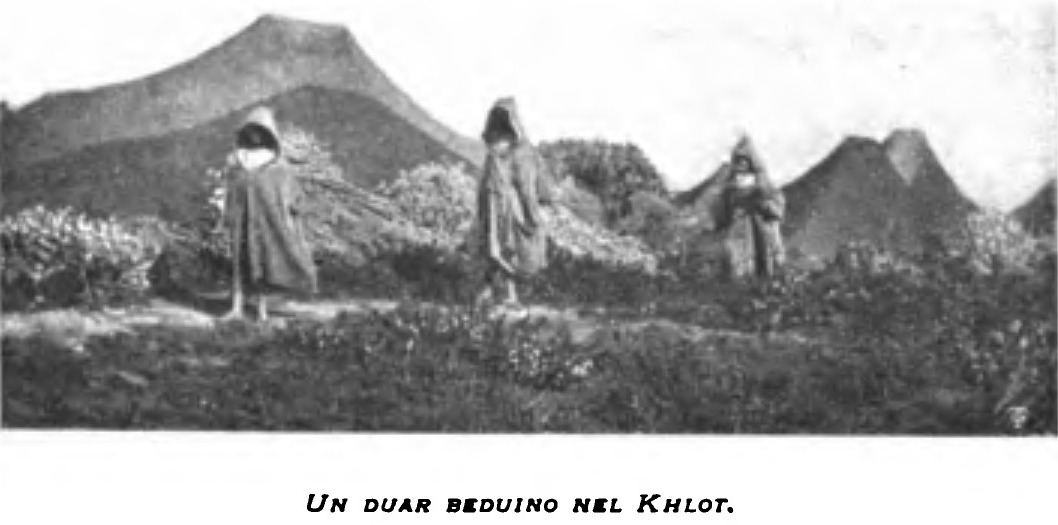
Bedouin duwwar belonging to the Khlut tribe

Traditionally, Arubis lived in duwwars (lit. 'circle') which were settlements made up of dwellings arranged in a circle. Although, by the start of the 20th century, due to sedentarisation, these settlements were arranged without much order. Livestock would be kept inside to rest at night sometimes protected by a deep ditch. The most common furnishings everywhere was mats and cushions. Rugs (ḥanbal) and mattresses were rare with the wealthiest owning higher quality rugs (zarbiya).

The most common types of dwelling were the nuwalla, bit and the qabusa. The nuwalla was a type of dwelling found throughout all of North Africa and could feature straight walls made of roughly hewn planks and branches plastered with mud, topped by a pitched thatched roof or could have reed walls that were either vertical or conical and were also plastered with mud. The bit was a single room structure made of dried mud bricks with a pitched thatched roof in the style of the Jbala. The qabusa was reserved for wealthy land owners and was circular and constructed from a tight lattice of interwoven reeds. It could be conical in shape or consist of a straight wall topped by a conical or domed thatched roof with the most luxurious versions of them being up to 4 metres in diameter, having three or four layers of latticework form the walls and being surrounded by thick rush mats. The qabusa managed to stay warm in the winter and cool in the summer. Tents (khayma) were still present in the beginning of the 20th century. They were mostly used for women's dwellings and were then not made of animal skin but the plant asphodel (berwaq).

In the modern day, Arubis live in villages (also known as duwwars) of mud-brick (ṭob) houses covered with corrugated iron roofs with two or three slopes. Sometimes, a reed nuwalla is used as a shed or for winter cooking.

=== Tbourida ===
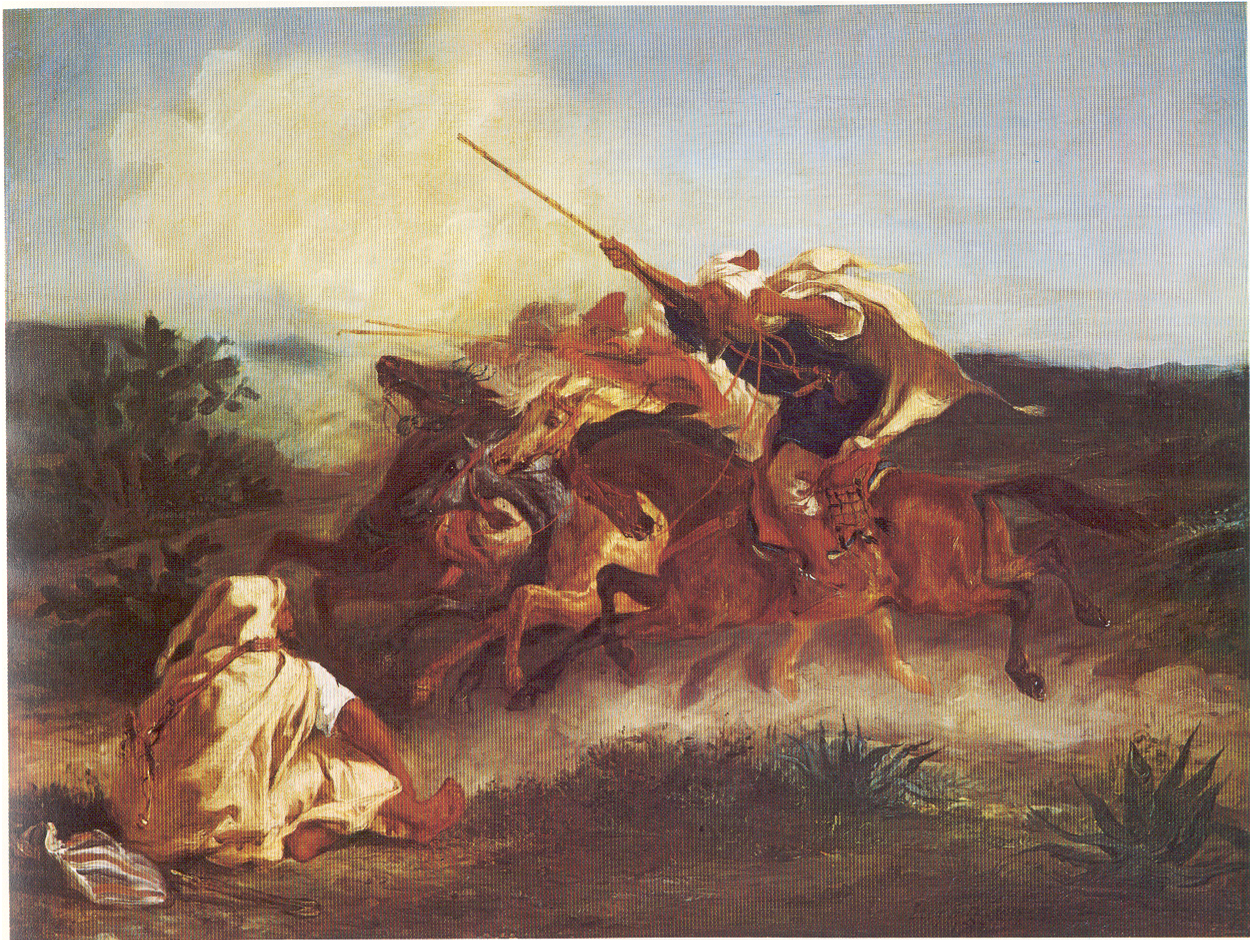
Fantasia arabe (1833) by Eugène Delacroix

The tribes of the Atlantic coast all indulge heavily in Fantasia or laʿb al-barud (transl. powder play).

== See also ==
- Maghrebi Arabs

== Sources ==
- Ciucci, Alessandra (2022-05-25). The Voice of the Rural: Music, Poetry, and Masculinity Among Migrant Moroccan Men in Umbria. University of Chicago Press. ISBN 978-0-226-81869-6.
- Ech-charfi, Ahmed; Azzouzi, Lamyae (2017-05-11). "Ethnic Stereotypes and Lexical Semantics: The Emergence of the Rural/Urban Opposition in Moroccan Arabic". In Ebongue, Augustin Emmanuel; Hurst, Ellen (eds.). Sociolinguistics in African Contexts: Perspectives and Challenges. Springer. pp. 147–169. ISBN 978-3-319-49611-5.
- Hachimi, Atiqa (2007-12-14). "Becoming Casablancan Fessis in Casablanca as a case study". In Miller, Catherine; Al-Wer, Enam; Caubet, Dominique; Watson, Janet C. E. (eds.). Arabic in the City: Issues in Dialect Contact and Language Variation. Routledge. p. 102. ISBN 978-1-135-97875-4.
- Vignet-Zunz, Jacques Jawhar (2014). Les Jbala du Rif: des lettrés en montagne. Casablanca [Aix-en-Provence]: Éditions la Croisée des chemins IREMAM. pp. 190–193. ISBN 978-9954-1-0484-2.
- Baadj, Amar S. (2015). Saladin, the Almohads and the Banū Ghāniya: The Contest for North Africa (12th and 13th centuries). Brill. ISBN 978-90-04-29857-6.
- Bennison, Amira K. (2016). The Almoravid and Almohad Empires. Edinburgh University Press. ISBN 9780748646821.
- El Mansour, Mohamed (1981). Political and Social Developments in Morocco During the Reign of Mawlay Sulayman 1792-1822 (PhD thesis). SOAS University. doi:10.25501/SOAS.00033781.
- Burke III, Edmund (1976). Prelude to Protectorate in Morocco: Pre-Colonial Protest and Resistance, 1860-1912. University of Chicago Press. ISBN 978-0-226-08084-0.
- Hachimi, Atiqa (2012). "The urban and the urbane: Identities, language ideologies, and Arabic dialects in Morocco". Language in Society. 41 (3): 321–341. ISSN 0047-4045.
- Puschmann, Paul (2011). Casablanca: A Demographic Miracle on Moroccan Soil?. ACCO. p. 72. ISBN 978-90-334-8068-3.
