= Mohamed Benomar Ziani =

Mohamed Benomar Ziani محمد بنعمر الزياني
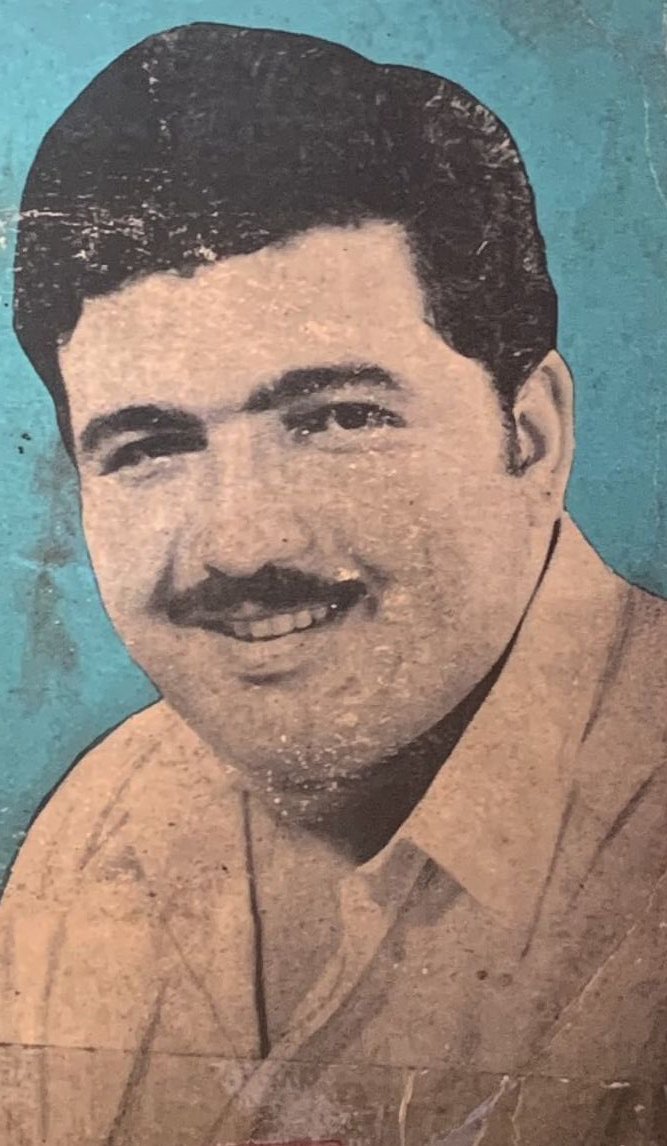

Background information
- Born: January 1, 1938 (age 88); Rabat
- Origin: Morocco
- Genres: Aita - Chaabi
- Years active: (1964 –present)

Mohamed Benomar Ziani (in Arabic:محمد بنعمر الزياني) (born 1938 in Rabat) is a Moroccan musician specialized in the Aita and Chaabi music.

== Life ==
Benomar Ziani attended the Mohammed V School and obtained his primary certificate in 1953 from the school for sons of Muslim notables. He then studied at the Moulay Youssef High School in Rabat, where French teachers introduced him to music. He deepened his musical studies with Abdelouahab Agoumi at the Conservatoire des Orangers in Rabat. During this period he crafted his first stringed instrument, a traditional "Souisdi", and formed a musical group with friends including the actor Larbi Doghmi.

Mohamed Benomar Ziani was born in 1938 in Rabat from a family originating from the Oulad Zyan tribe, in the Chaouia tribal confederacy in the Casablanca region. He grew up between Rabat and Salé, and learned from different musical masters of the region in several genres including: Malhun, Andalusian music and Gharnati.

After completing his studies, Benomar started working as a civil servant in Rabat before working as an Arabic-French translator in the city of Rommani between 1958 and 1959. However, he realized that he was not interested in pursuing a career in this work, and in 1964 he founded his own music group and launched a professional career in music.

As a professional musician, he started first by singing in clubs and festivals, before being invited regularly to perform in Moroccan Television. His success in Morocco granted him the nickname of Jimi Hendrix of violin, as he mastered this instrument very well.

Benomar Ziani collaborated with several Moroccan singers, including Zohra Al Fassiya, Salim Halali and Samy Elmaghribi. He performed also abroad. One of his famous trips was in 1983, where he sang in Walt Disney World.
