= Hamza Khafif =

Moroccan actor, poet, musician, and visual artist

Hamza Khafif (TaSh36)
- حمزة خفيف
- Born: Casablanca, Morocco
- Known for: Acting, poetry, music, graphic art
- Notable work: Role of Omar in the film Sofia (2018); percussionist with Kabareh Cheikhats; TaSh36 graphic-art exhibitions (notably *Imazighan*, Bachibouzouk, 26 Oct 2019)
- Style: Graphic art inspired by Amazigh motifs; contemporary multidisciplinary practice
- Movement: Contemporary art

Hamza Khafif (Arabic: حمزة خفيف), also known by the pseudonym TaSh36, is a Moroccan actor, poet, musician, and graphic artist from Mohammedi, a city near Casablanca, Morocco. Khafif is currently based in Bologna, Italy.

== Name ==
TaSh36 is the pseudonym Khafif uses for his work as a graphic artist. "TaSh" refers to Tashelhit, the language of the Shilha Amazigh people, and his art style is directly influenced by Amazigh motifs.

== Career ==
=== Music ===
Khafif has performed as a percussionist with Kabareh Cheikhats, a cabaret theatrical performance by Jouk Attamtil Al Bidaoui (جوق التمثيل البيضاوي ). The troupe reinterprets the tradition of Aïta, or vocal shikhat music, a traditional folk musical style originating in rural Morrocco sang in Arabic. Kabareh Cheikhats performed at Festival International des Arts de Bordeaux Métropole (FAB) in October 2018 where the troupe of eleven men played the roles of women. Kabreh Cheikhats, with Khafif, appeared on BBC News Arabic in 2019 to discuss gender stereotypes in Morocco.

In April 2022, Khafif participated as a vocalist and played the bendir, a type of traditional North African drum, as part of University Musical Society's (UMS) performance event Sahra (Arabic for "soiree") in Detroit, Michigan. This event was held in association with the Arab American National Museum.

=== Film ===
He performed the role of Omar, one of the main characters in Meryem Benm'Barek-Aloïsi's 2018 film Sofia, which was screened as part of the Un Certain Regard section at the Cannes Film Festival that same year. The film is a Moroccan drama following a young woman in Casablanca who gives birth out of wedlock and must identify the father within 24 hours to avoid legal consequences, exposing tensions around social norms and women's rights. Omar, played by Khafif, is the father of the child, whose identification lower-class identity becomes central to the unfolding legal and family crisis. The film received a 92% on Rotten Tomatoes' Tomatometer, and a 6.7 on IMDB. At Cannes, Benm'Barek-Aloïsi won the Prix du scénario award for Best Screenplay, and Sofia was screened as part of the 2018 Festival International du Film Francophone de Namur in Belgium.

Khafif is also known for his performance in the short film A Call from Heaven (2021), a Moroccan drama directed by Zaid Ghatous about a young man grappling with the death of his father and his search for meaning through a symbolic phone call to the afterlife. In this film, Khafif appears as a principal cast member playing Soul, alongside Walid Sam, the Tangier-based actor who plays the protagonist, Noureddine. The film explores themes of fatherhood, familial love, and profound loss.

=== Graphic art ===
On October 26, 2019, Khafif's work was exhibited alongside a screening of Manel Mahdouani's work on Amazigh tattooing in an exhibition called Imazighan (إمازيغن) at Bachibouzouk. TaSh36's work explores motifs from Amazigh art and culture and their relationship with Moroccan history, in an attempt to renew them, which is showcased on his instagram account, tash36_art. His art includes themes of antiracism, equality, feminism, and decolonisation.

=== Activism ===
In 2021, Khafif participated in a theatre forum in Rabat and Casablanca as part of Paroles de Jeunes pour la Redevabilité (Words of Youth for Responsibility), an annual project led by Transparency Morocco in partnership with the Heinrich Böll Foundation in Rabat. The group performance focused on the themes of access to information, sexual violence, and corruption.

Khafif is outspoken for his support of the #FreeKoulchi (Free Everyone) movement and the grassroots GenZ 212 movement of youth activists in Morocco. Via social media, he expressed his support of the 2025 Moroccan Gen Z protests.
