= Battle of Sidi Moumen =

- Part of Chaouïa War
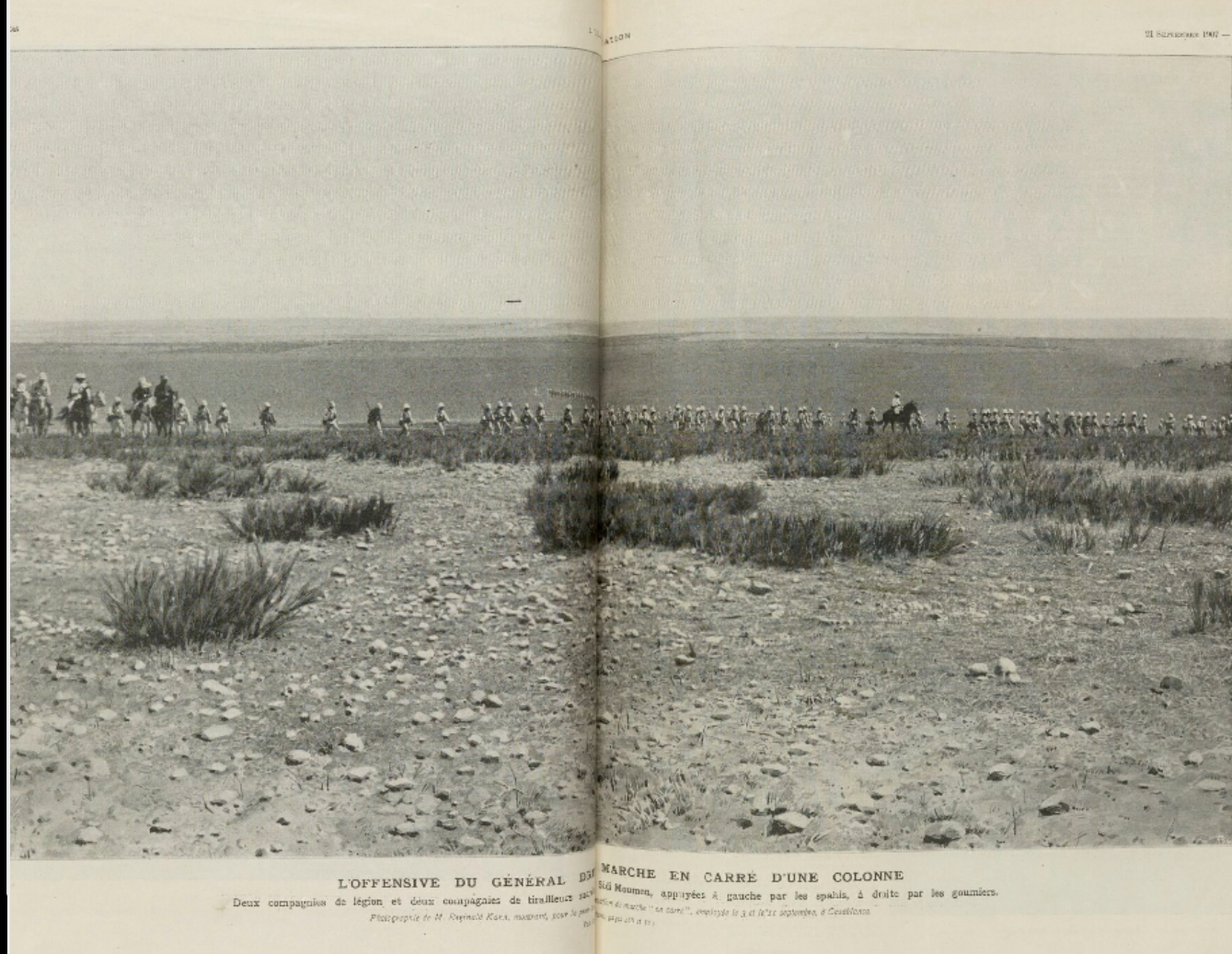
- General Drude's offensive on Sidi Moumen
| Date | 3th september 1903 |
| Location | Sidi Moumen, Casablanca, Morocco |
| Result | Chaouïa victory |

Belligerents
| Chaouïa | France |

Commanders and leaders
| unknown | Antoine Drude; Colonel Blanc; Colonel Brulard; Lieutenant Provost † |

Units involved
| Chaouïa Confederation; Mehalla of Titmellil; Zyayda; Mzab; Mehalla of Taddert; Oulad Hriz; Oulad Saïd; Ouled Bouziri; Ouled Sidi Bendaoud; Mzamza; Mehalla of Mdakra tribe; Mehalla of Zenata tribe; Mehalla of Hadj Bouchaib's Qasbah | France; 1st Regiment of Tirailleurs algériens; 2nd Regiment of Tirailleurs algériens; 3 groups from the French Foreign Legion; of which the 15th brigade of the 2nd Regiment of French Foreign Legion |

Strength
| ~ 8000 mens | 1200 soldiers 300 horsemens |

Casualties and losses
| | 10 killed 17 wounded |

The Battle of Sidi Moumen was a confrontation that took place on September 3, 1907, between the tribes of the Chaouïa resisting French penetration into their territory, which led to the Chaouïa War.

== Context ==
The French Minister of War considered it necessary to strike a severe blow against the tribes in the region to break their determination and seize their food reserves. General Drude, in command of the French troops in Casablanca, organized this operation after suffering a setback on August 28, 1907. The objective was to mobilize significant forces, including artillery and cavalry, to engage the Mujahideen in a decisive battle following instructions received from Paris.

== Events ==
On September 3, 1907, the French troops were formed into two echelons or "squares." The first square, commanded by Lieutenant-Colonel Blanc, served as bait to lure the Moroccans into open terrain. The second square, in support, was led by Lieutenant-Colonel Brulard and General Drude. At 8:30 AM, the forward echelon arrived at the Marabout of Sidi Moumen and found itself engaged on several fronts, particularly towards "hill 106".

The battle intensified around a position called the "gotta" (Ouled-bou-Azza-Brahim), an enclosure surrounded by cactus hedges and ditches where the Moroccan resistors were hiding. The 5th company of Captain Dérigoin was sent to clear the ridges and protect the movements of the French squares. The Moroccan fighters showed great skill, managing to infiltrate their cavalry between the two French formations. The French artillery (75mm battery) intervened to support the infantry, which was under heavy fire.

Around 10 AM, after five hours of fighting, the order to retreat was given. The withdrawal to the trenches of Casablanca took place under the protection of the artillery, while the Moroccans entered the "gotta" as soon as the colonial troops left. The 5th company alone had used more than 13,000 cartridges during the engagement, out of an original stock of 21,000.

== Consequences ==
The French casualties amounted to 10 dead, including Captains Provost and Benize, and 17 wounded. This lack of decisive success affected the morale of the troops and exposed the French command to criticism. The French government was forced to send reinforcements and observation balloons to limit risks during reconnaissance missions.

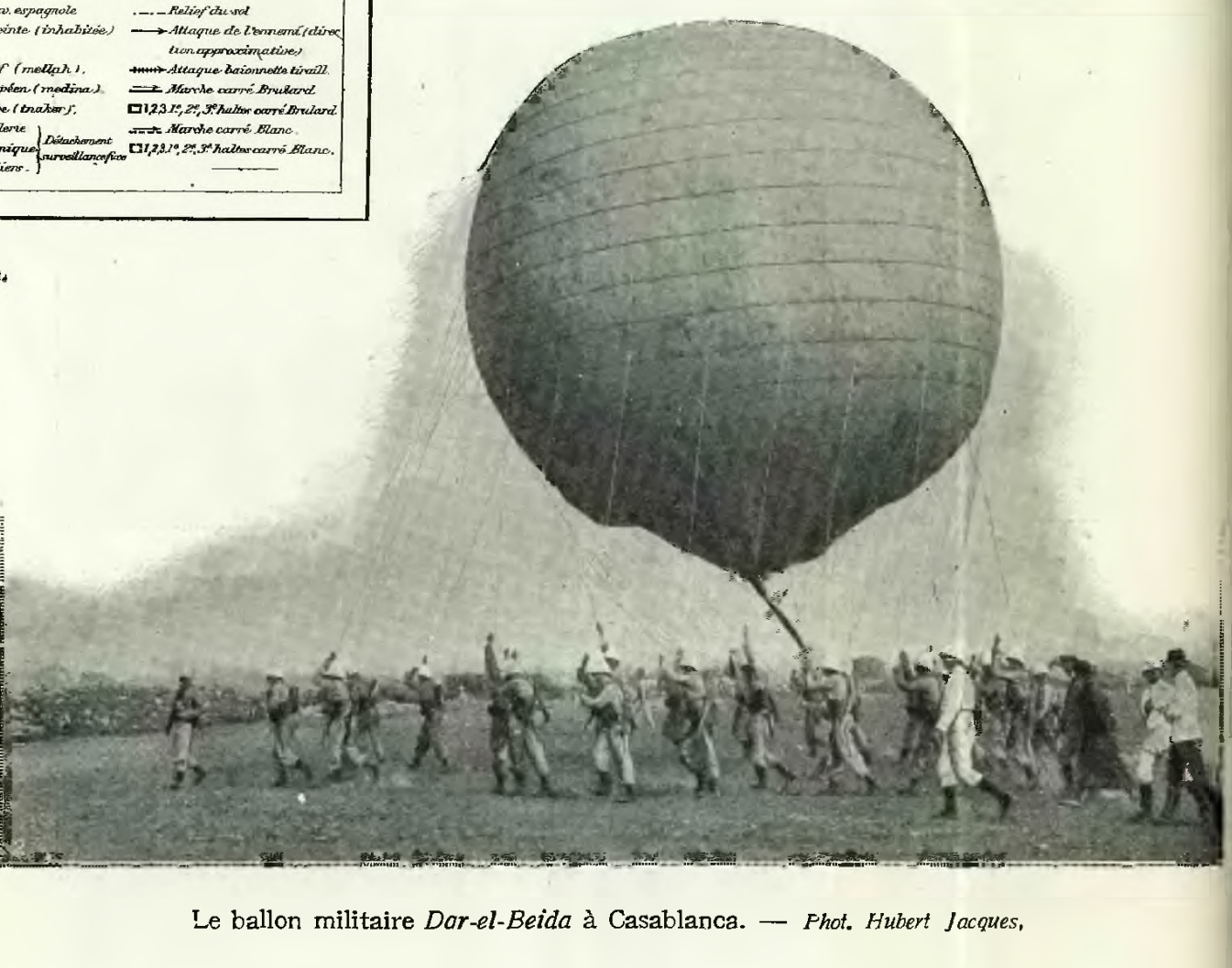
Observation balloon Dar el-Beida

Subsequently, General Drude attempted raids against the camps of Taddart (September 11) and Sidi Brahim (September 21), but these operations were deemed ineffective by some officers like Sabatier, as the populations evacuated before the arrival of the soldiers, leaving only meager spoils. On the contrary, Moroccan resistance strengthened with the arrival of contingents sent by Moulay Abd al-Hafid, maintaining constant pressure on the occupying forces. Reports from the time, particularly those from Admiral Philibert, highlighted the remarkable accuracy of Moroccan shooters and their courage in the face of French technical superiority.
