= Haim Botbol =

Moroccan singer and composer

Haim Botbol حاييم بوطبول

Haim Botbol (Arabic: حاييم بوطبول; born 1937) is a Moroccan musician.

== Biography ==
He was born to a Jewish family in Fes renowned for chaabi music. His father Jacob Abitbol was a leader of the malhun musical tradition in Fes. The family name Botbol (بوطبول) or Abitbol (أبيتبول) means "father of the drum" in Darija.

As a young performer, he excelled in various styles, from aita and chaabi to Gharnati and raï. He was a multi-instrumentalist, but excelled with the oud and bendir. He wrote his own lyrics and composed his own music.

With his family—including his father, his brother Marcel on the violin, and his brother Claude on percussion—he formed an ensemble performing classical works and poetry. From 1950, he formed a duo with the Algerian Salim Halali, covering a number of Maghrebi classics. In the 1960s, he incorporated various influences into his music, including malhun, gnawa, salsa, reggae, and funk, composing over 80 songs. At the apex of his career, Botbol worked with the singer and producer Maurice Elbaz.

One of Botbol's most notable songs is "Jaya Tomobile."
