= Haja El Hamdaouia =

Moroccan singer (1930–2021)

- الحاجة الحمداوية
- Born: 28 October 1930; Casablanca, Morocco
- Died: 5 April 2021 (aged 90); Rabat, Morocco
- Occupations: Singer; Songwriter; Composer
- Known for: Aita songs

Haja El Hamdaouia (Arabic: الحاجة الحمداوية; 28 October 1930 – 5 April 2021) was a Moroccan singer and songwriter, known for singing Moroccan Chaabi and Aita.

== Biography ==
El Hamdaouia was born on 28 October 1930 and grew up in Derb Sultan in Casablanca where she started singing from a young age. She sang in front of the "patchwork" Orchestra.

She started her career in the 1950s, performing the genre "El Aita al Marsaouia". This is one of the most popular styles of Moroccan traditional music. "El Aita" can be translated into "the call" or "the cry" in which performers sing about a particular cause. During the French protectorate, singers of El Aita were popular for their lyrics, calling for the colonizers to leave the country.

She performed at Salim Halali's cabaret in Maarif, Le Coq d'Or.

El Hamdaouia was also known for her unique appearances on stage, inseparable from her bendir, a large hand-held frame drum. The artist was also famous for her classic hairstyles and colorful caftans on stage.

El Hamdaouia's songs are considered pop classics and were adapted by many current Moroccan pop musicians. She performed together with famous artists such as Cheb Khaled and Hamid Bouchnak.

After a week of suffering health complications that required her to be transferred to the hospital for medical supervision, El Hamdaouia died on 5 April 2021 at Cheikh Zaid hospital in Rabat, aged 90.

== Songs ==
El Hamdaouia is famous for several songs such as:

- "Ha lkass Hlou" (duo with Hamid Bouchnak).
- "Daba Yji"
- "Jiti majiti"
- "Dada ou hiyani"
- "Mal hbibi’liya"
- "Hna mada bina"
