= Toulal =

Coordinates: 32°18′13″N 3°59′10″W

- municipality and town
- Interactive map of Toulal
- Country: Morocco
- Region: Fès-Meknès
- Prefecture: Meknès Prefecture

Population (2004)
  - Total: 13,852
- Time zone: UTC+0 (GMT)

Toulal is a suburb of Meknes and municipality in Meknès Prefecture of the Fès-Meknès region of Morocco. At the time of the 2004 census, the commune had a total population of 13,852 people living in 2896 households.

It is named after the oasis of Toulal in the commune of Guir, Midelt Province.

== Notable people ==
- Houcine Toulali, Malhun singer & songwriter
