= Mzab =

Mzab may refer to:

- M'zab, a UNESCO World Heritage Site in Ghardaïa Province, Algeria
- Mzab (Moroccan tribe), a tribe in Morocco
- Mzab gundi, a species of rodent
- Mzab–Wargla languages, a dialect cluster in North Africa
