= Fatima Hadad =

Moroccan singer and artistic director

- Born: 5 November 1969 (age 56); Kenitra, Morocco
- Education: University of Rabat
- Occupation: singer

Fatima Hadad (born 5 November 1969) is a Moroccan singer and artistic director. She is an exponent of the Moroccan sung poetry known as Malhun. In 2004 she founded a society for others interested in this Moroccan cultural heritage.

== Life ==
Hadad was born in the port of Kenitra in North West Morocco in 1969. Her father, Hadad al-Ragragui, was an imam and her mother was Baqdim Aicha. She studied law at the University of Rabat but she was already interested in singing. She had become very interested in poetry when at school and she would sing songs by popular contemporary Lebanese singers.

She was a particular fan of the Moroccan sung poetry known as Malhun and one of its leading modern exponents Houcine Toulali (1924–1998). Haddad leads her own musical ensemble who perform Malhun poetry.

Fatima Hadad started an association in 2004 named Jawg Huwwat fann al-malhun for enthusiasts of Malhun. The association grew out of a performance group that she had organised. Initially she had hoped to form a women's only organisation but she found that they could not commit the time because of their family. Hadad was able to commit a lot of her time as her husband was also in the performing arts and they both supported each other's work.

In 2022 she was the President of the Melhoun Group of the Association of Art Lovers of Kenitra. The Moroccan department of Culture organised the 27th Sijilmassa Meeting of the art of Melhoun with HM King Mohammed VI as patron of the event.

== Private life ==
Haddad is married and they have a daughter.
