= Haja Hamounia =

Moroccan folk singer

Haja Hamounia

Haja Hamounia (also known as Hajja Hamounia, Fatima Hamounia, Cheikha El Hammounia) (born 1937 in Douar Hammoun, Morocco; died 2013 in Safi, Morocco) was a Moroccan folk singer. She was called the Ambassador of Aïta, a traditional Bedouin genre of song, and known for her purist renditions of the Aïta Hasbaouia in its classical form.

== Life and career ==
Fatema El Kout was born in 1937 to a family of Sufis in Douar Hammoun, a village in the Essaouira region of Morocco. Her mother died when she was young, and she was married off at the age of 12. Upset, she managed to escape to her aunt in Essaouira and obtain a divorce. Here she met Sheikh Jilali, who began to train her in the Aita, and encouraged her to become a chanteuse.

She faced family disapproval upon becoming a folk singer, with her father threatening to kill her. She fled to Safi with Jilali, whom she married in the 1970s. She established a music troupe that would accompany her for nearly 25 years.

Under the name Hamounia, she began to be known for her renditions of the Aita repertoire. In the 1970s, she attained great popularity for her songs Mal hbibi malou and li bgha hbibi. In demand to perform at ceremonies of the Moroccan social elites, she was also invited to sing at the wedding of King Hassan II's daughter, Lalla Hasna, in 1994 at Fez.

Hamounia was a great exponent of the Hasbaouia mode of Aita, which is in danger of extinction as the number of singers capable of interpreting it falls. Under her tutelage, several talented musicians have emerged, such as Khadija Margoum, another doyenne of Aita, Hajib, a chaâbi performer, and Cheikha Tsunami.

== Death ==
Hamounia died on 2 July 2013 from respiratory illness, and was interred at the Saada cemetery in Safi.
