= Mohamed Bouzoubaa (singer) =

Moroccan singer (1939–2015)

Haj Mohamed Bouzoubaâ (20 August 1939, in Fez, Morocco–21 January 2015, Fez) was a Moroccan malhun singer.
