= Kharbusha =

Kharbusha (Arabic: خربوشة) was a Moroccan Aita singer from the region of Abda who became famous for her songs in defence of her tribe against colonialism and the ruling governor of the region, Isa ibn Umar al-Abdi.

== Early life ==
Kharbusha was born Hadda and had the nickname Hawida which is the dimunative form of Hadda. She was called "Kharbusha" because of the effects of smallpox on her face. She belongs to the Awlad Zayd - a branch of the Arab Bhatra tribe which is part of the Abda confederation.

== Resistance ==
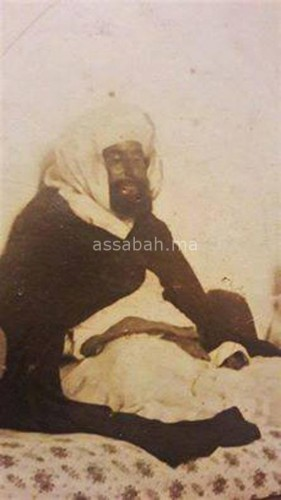
Qaid Isa bin Umar al-Abdi

Isa ibn Umar al-Abdi was the ruling qaid of the Abda and he persecuted the Awlad Zayd by confiscating their horses and land and disarming them. Although all of the tribes in the Abda were subjected to the rule of Isa ibn Umar, the Awlad Zayd resisted especially after the death of Hassan I of Morocco. Isa ibn Umar responded with punitive expeditions against the Awlad Zayd systematically exterminating those that resisted them. Kharbusha joined the resistance singing Aita songs to rally her tribe to revolt in 1895. Kharbusha described Isa ibn Umar al-Abdi as an evil and cruel man with the days under his rule being days of qahra w dlam (of wretchedness and darkness). An excerpt from one of her songs go:

You burnt the fields and looted the cattle,
You treated women as you would the ostriches
You have orphaned boys, in droves.
And so, you have treated the šiḫ (head of tribe), the servant, and the mqadam (expeditor)
As they all beg you for their lives
You ruled through injustice and heart-distressing ways
Thinking that your qaid-ship (leadership) will last forever
You deprived meritorious men of their stature
And pushed the ignoble up front
Walk on, O Aissa ben Omar,
O, you eater of ğifa (carrion)
O, you killer of his own brothers
O, you who have made that which is ḥaram (forbidden), ḥalal (acceptable). O my woe!
Wa labas a labas, a labas (that's fine)
Hak daq bla qartas (No need for bullets, my words will kill you well enough).

== Legacy ==
A film based on her life, Kharboucha (2008), was directed by Moroccan director Hamid Zoughi. Although she has been largely ignored in Moroccan historical heritage, she has been used as a symbol of resistance against government oppression and discrimination against women. She served as the source of inspiration for the song "Story of Kharbusha" (Hikayat Kharbusha) written by poet Mohamed al-Batouli and performed by singer Hayat Idrissi. This song was censored by the Moroccan government in 1993 under the pretext that it slandered a Moroccan government official who died in 1925. Other singers have reproduced modified version of this song to avoid censorship like Bouchaib El Bidaoui and Haja El Hamdaouia.
