= Ziani =

Ziani is a surname. Notable people with the surname include:

- Hocine Ziani (born 1953), Algerian painter
- Kamal Ziani (born 1972), Spanish long-distance runner
- Karim Ziani (born 1982), Algerian footballer
- Marc'Antonio Ziani (c. 1653–1715), Italian composer
- Mohamed Benomar Ziani (born 1938), Moroccan singer
- Pietro Ziani (died 1230), Doge of Venice
- Pietro Andrea Ziani (1616–1684), Italian composer
- Salima Ziani (born 1994), Moroccan singer and activist
- Samir Ziani (born 1990), French boxer
- Sebastiano Ziani (died 1178), Doge of Venice
- Stéphane Ziani (born 1971), French footballer
