= Arubi =

Arubi is a surname. Notable people with the surname include:

- Gbemi Arubi, Irish footballer
- Washington Arubi, Zimbabwean footballer

== See also ==
- Arubis
