= Kaddour El Alamy =

Sidi Kaddour El Alami (Arabic: سيدي قدور العلمي) also transliterated as Qaddur al-Alami (born 1742 in Meknes, died 1850) was a Moroccan poet best known for his songs. His full name was Abd al-Qadir ibn Mohammed ibn Ahmad ibn Abi-l-Qasim al-Idrisi al-Alami al-Hamdani and he was known under the name Sayyidi Qaddur al-Alami at-Talibi al-Abd as-Salami. He was a songwriter in the genre of the malhun and founded the sufi zawiyya Alamin in Meknes, an influential one for the malhun. He grew up in Meknes.
