= Sofia (2018 film) =

2018 film directed by Meryem Benm'Barek-Aloïsi

- Film poster
- Directed by: Meryem Benm'Barek-Aloïsi
- Written by: Meryem Benm'Barek-Aloïsi
- Release date: 16 May 2018 (Cannes)
- Countries: Belgium; France; Morocco; Qatar
- Languages: Arabic, French

Sofia is a 2018 drama film written and directed by Meryem Benm'Barek-Aloïsi. It was screened in the Un Certain Regard section at the 2018 Cannes Film Festival. At Cannes, Meryem Benm'Barek-Aloïsi won the Un Certain Regard Award for Best Screenplay.

== Plot ==
The film takes place in Casablanca, and it tells the story of a pregnant and unmarried young woman in her country, Morocco—where sexual relations out of wedlock are forbidden by law.

== Cast ==
- Maha Alemi as Sofia
- Sarah Perles as Lena
- Hamza Khafif as Omar
- Lubna Azabal as Leila
- Faouzi Bensaïdi as Faouzi
- Nadia Benzakour as Fatiha
- Nadia Niazi as Zineb
- Ghita Fokri as Sanaa
