= Abdelaziz al-Maghrawi =

Moroccan poet and first known author of a qasida

Abu Faris abd al-Aziz al-Maghrawi (Arabic: عبد العزيز المغراوي; died 1605) was a Moroccan poet and the first known author of a qasida written in malhun.
