= Thami Mdaghri =

Thami Lamdaghri or Mdaghri (died 1856) is a well known Moroccan writer and composer of malhun songs. He is known for songs like Al-Gnawi and Aliq Al-Masrūh.
