= Zyayda =

Arabic-speaking tribe in Morocco

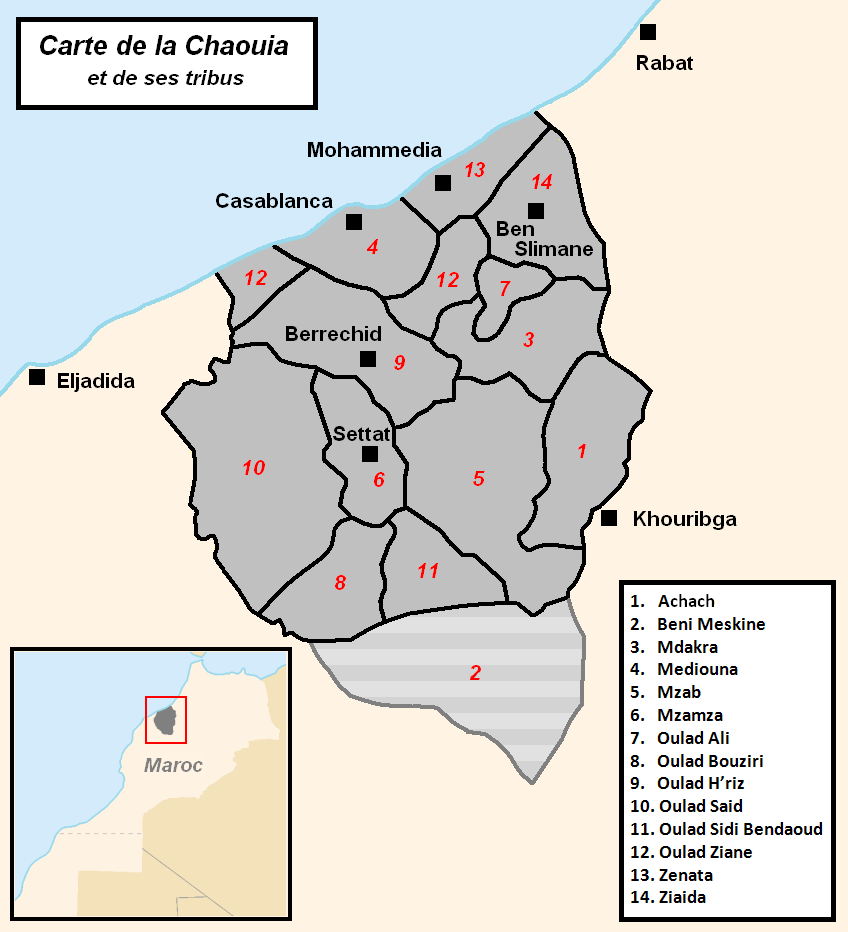
Map of the historical Chaouia province and the territories of Chaouia tribes

Zyayda (Arabic: زيايدة) is an Arabic-speaking tribe in Morocco, belonging to the Chaouia tribal confederacy. According to French colonial-era orientalist Édouard Michaux-Bellaire, they are of Sanhaja origin.

The Zyayda tribe has integrated Arab and Berber elements of various origins throughout its history and, between the late 19th and early 20th centuries, absorbed the Beni Oura tribe, a small tribe of Maghraoua Berber origin.

== See also other tribes ==
- Sless
- Maqil
- Beni Ahsen
- Beni Hassan
- Mzab

== See also ==
- Arab tribes
- Maghreb
- Maghrebis
