= Saida Fikri =

Moroccan singer and composer

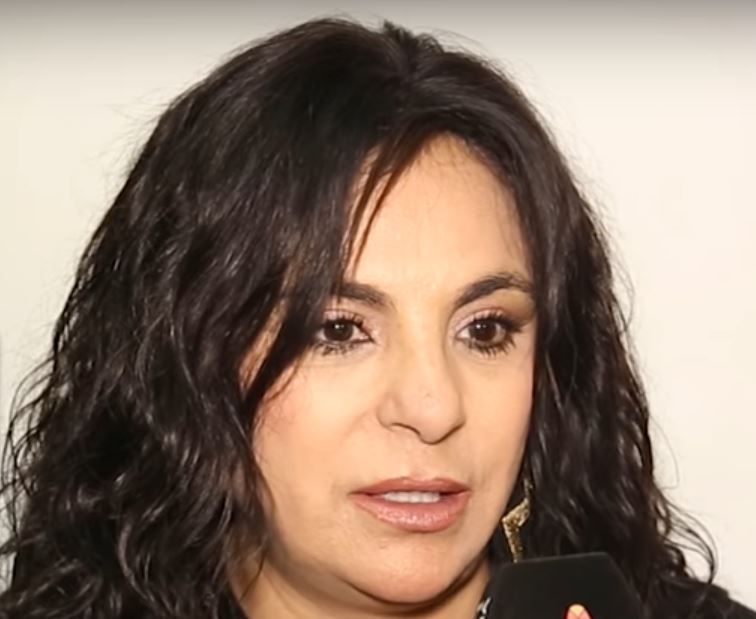

Background information
- Born: 28 November 1971 (age 53)

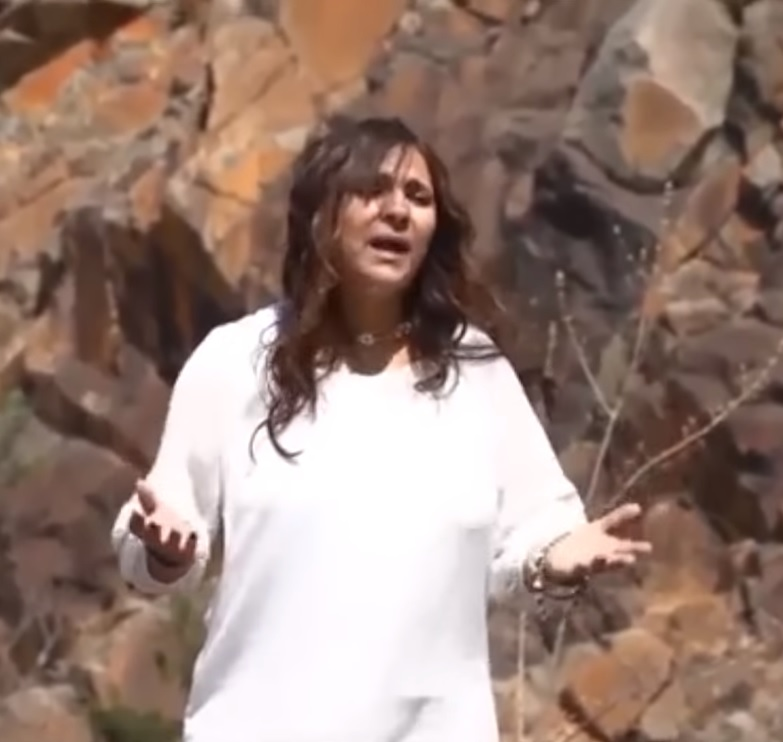
Saida Fikri

Saida Fikri (Arabic: سعيدة فكري; born 28 November 1971 in Casablanca) is a Moroccan singer and composer. Her songs blend Moroccan folk and Western rock music.

She started singing with her brother Khalid Fikri and achieved notability in Morocco in the early 1990s. She is most remembered for songs such as Salouni al Adab (Ask me about pain). In 1998, she was banned in Morocco from public performance for the political tone of her songs. The ban was only lifted in 2008.

In 1997 she emigrated to the United States and settled there and acquired American citizenship.

== Albums ==
- 1993 : Nadmana
- 1995 : Salouni alâdab
- 1998 : Al Hamech
- 2001 : Kloub Arrahma
- 2004 : Assir Al Madfoune
- 2005 : Hanna
- 2006 : Essilm

== See also ==
- Hamid Bouchnak
