= Fatna Bent Lhoucine =

Moroccan singer

Fatna Bent Lhoucine فاطنة بنت الحسين
- Born: 1935; Sidi Bennour, Morocco
- Died: April 6, 2005 (aged 69–70); Sidi Bennour, Morocco
- Genres: Aita - Chaabi

Fatna Bent Lhoucine (in Arabic: فاطنة بنت الحسين) (born 1935 - died 6 April 2005 in Sidi Bennour, Morocco) was a Moroccan singer specialized in the Aita and Chaabi music. She was a prominent artist in this genre, and was among others called "the Aita Legend".

Fatna Bent Lhoucine recorded during her long career more than 200 songs with the "Oulad Ben Aguida" group. She stopped singing in 2002 after performing Hajj, at the age of 67, and died three years later, in her hometown of Sidi Bennour.
