= Said Senhaji =

Musical artist

Said Senhaji سعيد الصنهاجي
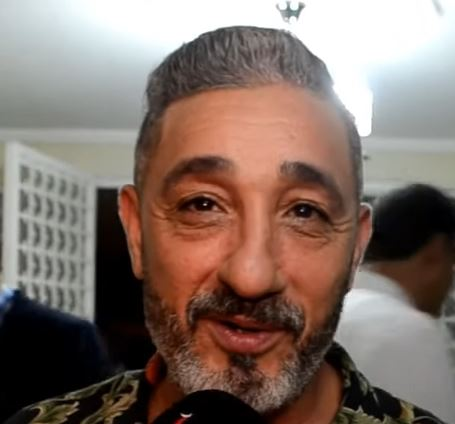

Background information
- Also known as: Senhaji
- Born: 1968 (age 56–57); Casablanca

Saïd Senhaji (Arabic: سعيد الصنهاجي; 1968) is a chaabi singer from Casablanca, Morocco. His roots go back to Taounate, Morocco. He is sometimes referred to as Sultan al-Ughnia ash-Sha'abia (سلطان الاغنية الشعبية Sultan of the Chaabi Ballad).

== Songs ==
- Pirouche ould El Abdia, Senhaji Said, Titou, Nachat el R'ma, Samia and Fouzia lehrizia, Non Stop Jarra Vol. 2, Fassifone, 2005
- Senhaji Said, Senhaji Said, Fassifone, 2005
- Senhaji Said, Daoudi, Saïd Lahna, Ahmed Al Boutoula, Najat Tazi and Doukkala, Jarra non stop Chayyeb, Fassifone, 2002
