= Hamid Bouchnak =

Moroccan raï singer

Hamid Bouchnak حميد بوشناق
- Born: 13 May 1969 (age 57)
- Origin: Oujda, Morocco
- Genres: Raï, pop, jazz, reggae Chaabi
- Occupations: Singer-songwriter, instrumentalist
- Instruments: Guitar, drums Pianist
- Years active: 1975–present

Hamid Bouchnak (Arabic: حميد بوشناق; born 13 May 1969) is a Moroccan raï singer.

== See also ==
- Saida Fikri
