= Meryem Benm'Barek-Aloïsi =

Moroccan film director and screenwriter (born 1984)

- Born: 1984 (age 41–42); Rabat, Morocco
- Education: National Institute of Oriental Languages and Civilizations
- Occupations: Director; screenwriter
- Writing career
- Language: French
- Notable works: Sofia (2018), Jennah (2014)
- Notable awards: Award for Best Screenplay, Cannes Film Festival, Un Certain Regard (2018), Gan Foundation Grant, Doula Foundation Grant

Meryem Benm'Barek-Aloïsi is a Moroccan film director and screenwriter. She was a recipient of the 2017 Gan Foundation prize and a grant from the Doha Film Institute in 2017. Her feature film, Sofia won the best screenplay award at Cannes, Un Certain Regard section in 2018. She has also written and directed five short films, winning two filmmaking awards for her 2014 film Jenna in the United States.

== Biography ==
Meryem Benm'Barek-Aloïsi was born in 1984 in Rabat, Morocco. She attended the National Institute of Oriental Languages and Civilizations in Paris, studying Arabic languages. She later studied directing in 2010 at the INSAS film school in Brussels. Benm'Barek-Aloïsi directed five short films in Brussels, gaining attention for Nor (2013) and Jennah (2014). Benm'Barek-Aloïsi has created exhibitions in sound art at the Victoria and Albert Museum in London.

In 2017, the Gan Foundation for Film, which supports first and second full length film projects, awarded Benm'Barek-Aloïsi a €53,000 grant, as one of five winners. The foundation provides support to winning filmmakers from concept to production and distribution of their films. Also in the Spring of 2017, Benm'Barek-Aloïsi was named a grant recipient by the Doha Film Institute.

== Film career ==
=== Sofia (2018) ===
Sofia, "the director's portrait of a country's complex relationship to its own values, laws and taboos" tells the story of a 20 year old Moroccan women desperately searching for the father of her unborn child to avoid being reported to the authorities. The story opens with Sophia, who is unaware she is pregnant until she goes into labor. Her cousin, Lena, a medical student understands what is happening to Sophia and takes her to a hospital. In a race against time, the hospital grants the young woman 24 hours to provide documentation of the father of the child before alerting the police. Together with her cousin, Sophia tries to locate the young man she only met once.

Sofia was presented at the Cannes Film Festival, section Un Certain Regard. Benm'Barek-Aloïsi won the best screenplay award at the festival and a standing ovation from the Cannes audience for her film.

=== Jennah (2014) ===
In 2014, the short film Jennah was released. Written and directed by Benm'Barek-Aloïsi, the story centers on a 13 year old girl growing up in Morocco. The film was the winner of the jury award at the Atlanta Film Festival in 2015 for Best New Mavericks Short. It also won the Grand Prize for Best Short Film in the Rhode Island International Film Festival.

== Filmography ==
Year	Film	Role	Notes
2013	Nor (short)	Director; screenwriter	Filmed in Brussels, Belgium
2014	Jennah (short)	Director; screenwriter	Winner of the 2014 Grand Prize at Rhode Island Festival
2018	Sofia	Director; screenwriter	Award for Best Screenplay, 2018 Cannes Film Festival
2025	Behind the Palm Trees	Director; screenwriter	
