= Houcine Toulali =

Moroccan singer (1924–1998)

Background information
- Born: 1924; Toulal, Meknès Prefecture, Morocco
- Died: 7 December 1998 (aged 73–74) Meknes
- Genre: Malhun
- Occupations: Singer, Songwriter

Houcine Toulali (1924 – December 7, 1998) was a Moroccan writer and singer of Malhun compositions. He wrote hundreds of qasidas.
