= Massacre of Oued-Zem (1955) =

- Location: Oued Zem, Morocco
- Date: 20 August 1955
- Deaths: 50–75/77 (French sources), +100 (according to Moroccan testimonies)
- Victim: French-colons
- Perpetrator: Moroccan tribemen
- Motive: Anti-colonialism, Revenge for the exile of Mohamed V

The Massacre of Oued-Zem was a popular Moroccan uprising by the tribes surrounding Oued Zem, following the forced deposition of Mohammed V of Morocco. This event led to the killing of European settlers in the city and clashes with local law enforcement.

== History ==
The massacre was the direct result of the forced exile of Mohamed V, who was later sent into exile in Madagascar and replaced by a distant cousin, Mohamed Ben Arafa. In response, on 19 August 1955 (according to Moroccan sources, with almost no trace in French ones), over ten thousand Moroccans took to the streets of Oued Zem to demand the return of their Sultan. French forces on-site violently suppressed the demonstration, killing more than 12,000 Moroccans (considered martyrs in Morocco). The next day, the tribes returned to the city.

== Massacre ==
The tribes affected by the events included the Bani Smir, Smaala, the remaining Ouardigha tribes, and the Beni Khirane. Among them, the Smaala stood out as they led the charge into the city.

It all began around 8 a.m., when the insurgents reached Bou Jaad. By 8:30, groups of Beni Khirane entered the city by truck and horseback. Around 9 a.m., the Smaala, Bani Smir, and Beni Khirane tribes stormed the city. Over 20,000 men attacked the city, similar to razzias, even attacking the hospital. At 11 a.m., the 2nd Battalion of the 4th R.E.I was alerted to the atrocities in Oued Zem. Armed with axes, sticks, stones, and rifles, Moroccans shot at and stoned the French gendarmes in Oued Zem. One of them, gendarme Soumagne, was fatally wounded. For several hours, Lieutenant Bach and his men attempted to hold off the Smaala forces, both on foot and horseback, most armed with rifles, from the European quarter until reinforcements arrived. The gendarmerie on site reported between 50 and 75 Europeans killed (over 77 according to the Foreign Legion). Additionally, 19 security force members were killed.

Among the leaders of the massacre was caïd Bel Hajj [al-Smaali], from the Smaala tribe and an influential caïd. Also leading was chief Bendaoud ben al-Ghazwani al-Smiri from the Bani Smir, who led part of the massacre and killed five French citizens, fighting to the end and refusing to surrender.

== Aftermath ==
On 30 August 1955, a large portion of the massacre participants surrendered and requested aman (a traditional act of clemency), offering their submission in exchange for peace. Their plea was accepted, and they sacrificed 12 young cattle.

On 20 August 2023, for the 68th anniversary of the events, a group of 2,000 descendants of martyrs sent a letter regarding the crimes of 19 August 1955 to the President of the French Republic, Emmanuel Macron, but it went unanswered.
