= Oulad Zyan =

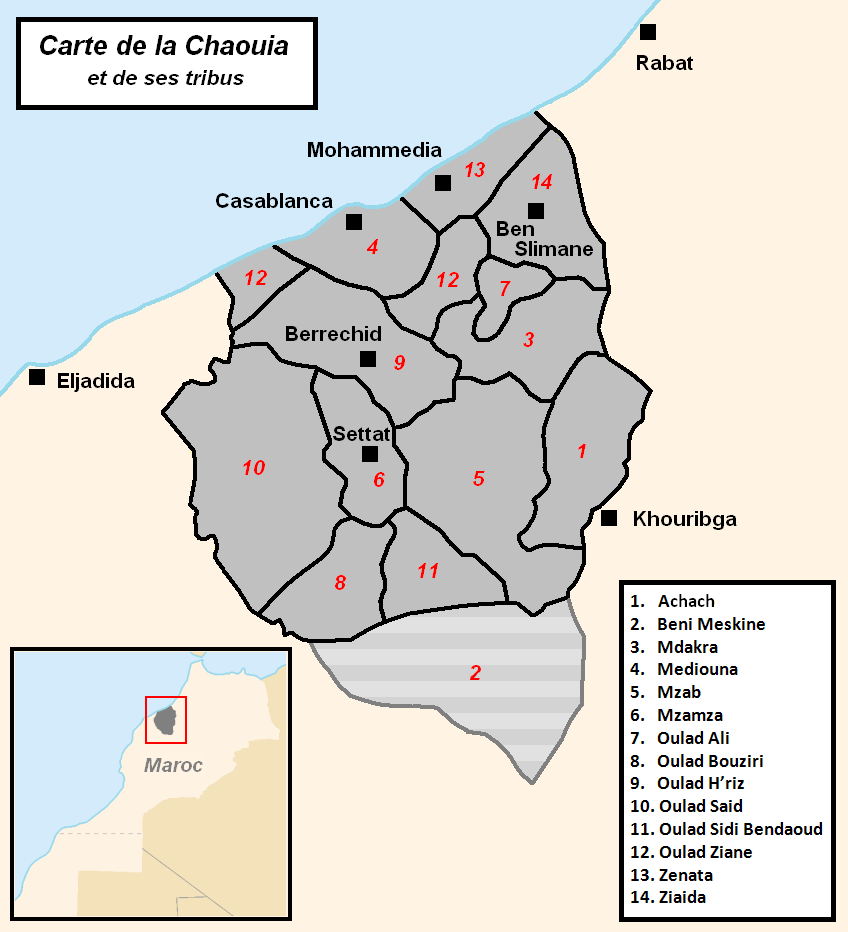
A map of the historical Chaouia province and the territories of Chaouia tribes.

Oulad Zyan or Awlad Ziyan (al-Hilalia) (Arabic: أولاد زيان, romanized: Awlād Ziyān) is a tribe in Morocco belonging to the Chaouia tribal confederation.

The special feature of this tribe is that its lands are separated into two parts by a distance of 30 km.: Oulad Zyan Moualine el Oued, which is southeast of Casablanca, and Oulad Zyan Soualem, which is south-west of the same city.

== Name ==
The tribe is named after a fraction of the Beni Malik which is a tribe found in the Gharb that once inhabited this territory.

== Origin ==
The origin of Oulad Zyan is Arab, being the descendants of Oulad Khalifa as accepted by Ibn Khaldun. Their great grandfather is Zyan bin Khalifa bin Askar (which she kept the name) bin Nadir bin Urwa bin Zughba bin bin Abi Rabi bin Nahik of Banu Hilal, Arab tribe originating of Nejd (now a province of present Saudi Arabia).

== Geography ==
The tribe is bordered by the Ziaida tribe northeast, by the Mdakra tribe southeast, by the Oulad Hariz tribe south-west by the Mediouna tribe northwest, and by the Zenata tribe in the north.

On his land, the river flows Oued el Maleh, it is also characterized by its many water sources (Ain Sbaa, Hlilifa Ain, Ain Zahra Ain Ghassalat, etc.). Its territory stretches for 12 km along the Atlantic coast and separates Mediouna (Chaouia) and Chiadma (Doukkala).
