= Tamasna =

Tamasna تامسنا ⵜⴰⵎⵙⵏⴰ
- Historical region
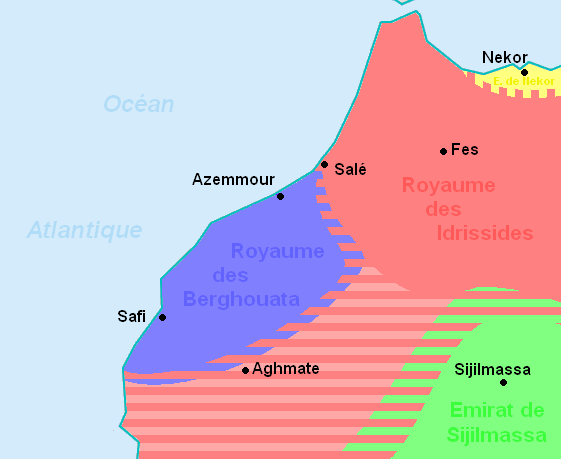
- Barghwata people (blue).
- Country: Morocco

Tamasna (Berber: Tamesna, ⵜⴰⵎⵙⵏⴰ, Arabic: تامسنا, romanized: Tāmasnā) is a historical region between Bou Regreg and Tensift in Morocco. It includes the modern regions of Chaouia, Doukkala, Abda, Rhamna, Sraghna and Chiadma.

The indigenous population is that of Barghwata who were driven by the Almoravids, subsequently the Almohads installed Bedouin Arabs. According to the 16th century Andalusian author Leo Africanus the Bedouins held the region for fifty years before suffering displacement by the Lamtuna. Subsequently, the Marinid dynasty granted the Tamasna region to the Zenata and Hawwara confederations, who established dominant military and political control over the province by the early modern period. describing the geography and history of the region, he writes in the Description of Africa:

Of Temesna one of the provinces of Fez: Westward it begins at the river Ommirabih, and stretches to the river Buragrag eastward; the south frontier thereof borders upon Atlas, and the north upon the Ocean sea. It is all over a plain country, containing in length from west to east almost fourscore miles, and in breadth from Atlas to the Ocean sea about threescore. This province has almost always been the principal of the seven before named (Temesna, Fez, Azghar, Elhabet, Errif, Garet, and Elchauz): for it contained to the number of forty great towns, besides three hundred castles, all which were inhabited by Barbarian Africans.

In the year 323 of the Hegeira this province was by a certain heretic against the Mahumetan religion called Chemim the son of Mennal freed from paying of tribute. This bad fellow persuaded the people of Fez to yield no tribute nor honor unto their prince, and himself he professed to be a prophet: but a while after he dealt not only in matters of religion, but in commonwealth-affairs also. At length waging war against the king of Fez (who was himself then warring with the people of Zenete) it so befell, that a league was concluded between them, conditionally that Chemim should enjoy Temesne, and that the king should contain himself within his lordship of Fez, so that from thenceforth neither should molest other. The said Chemim governed the province of Temesne about five and thirty years : and his successors enjoyed it almost a hundred years after his decease.

But king Ioseph having built Maroco, went about to bring this province under his subjection. Whereupon he sent sundry Mahumetan doctors, and priests to reclaim the governor thereof from his heresy, and to persuade him, if it were possible, to yield unto the king by fair means. Whereof the inhabitants being adverted, they consulted with a certain kinsman of the foresaid governor, in the city called Anfa, to murder the king of Maroco his ambassadors : and so they did. Soon after levying an army of fifty thousand men, he marched towards Maroco, intending to expel thence the family of Luntuna, and Ioseph their king. King Ioseph hearing of this news, was driven into wonderful perplexity of mind. Wherefore preparing a huge and mighty army, he stayed not the coming of his enemies: but on the sudden within three days, having conducted his forces over the river of Ommirabih, he entered Temesne, when as the foresaid fifty thousand men were so dismayed at the king's army, that they all passed the river Buragrag, and so fled into Fez. But the king so dispeopled and wasted Temesne, that without all remorse he put both man, woman, and child to the sword. This army remained in the region eight days, in which space they so razed and demolished all the towns and cities thereof, that there scarce remain any fragments of them at this time.

But the king of Fez on the other side hearing that the people of Temesne were come into his dominions, made a truce with the tribe of Zenete, and bent his great army against the said Temesnites. And at length having found them half famished near unto the river of Buragrag, he so stopped their passage on all sides, that they were constrained to run up the craggy mountains and thickets. At last being environed with the kings forces, some of them were drowned in the river, others were thrown down headlong from the rocks, and the residue were miserably slain by their enemies. And for the space of ten months there was such havock made among the Temesnites, that a silly remnant of them was left alive.

But king Ioseph prince of the Luntunes returned forthwith to Maroco for the repairing of his forces, to the end he might bid the king of Fez a battle. Howbeit Temesne being bereft of her people, was left to be inhabited of wild beasts. Neither had that province any new colony, or supply of inhabitants, till that about 150. years after, king Mansor returning from Tunis, brought thence certain Arabians with him, unto whom he gave the possession of Temesne. And these Arabians enjoyed the said province for fifty years, till such time as king Mansor himself was expelled out of his kingdom: and then were they also expelled by the Luntunes, and were brought unto extreme misery.

Afterward the kings of the family of Marin bestowed the said province upon the people of Zenete and Haoara. Hence it came to pass that the said people of Zenete and Haoara were always great friends unto the Marin family, and were thought to have defended them from the fury of the king of Maroco. From which time they have peaceably enjoyed Maroco, and now they are grown in less than a hundred years so mighty, that they stand not in fear of the king of Fez. For they are able to bring threescore thousand horsemen to the field, and have two hundred castles at their command. My self had great familiarity and acquaintance with them, and therefore I will not stick to record all memorable things which I saw among them.

— Leo Africanus
