= Chaouia (Morocco) =

Tribal confederation and historical region of Morocco

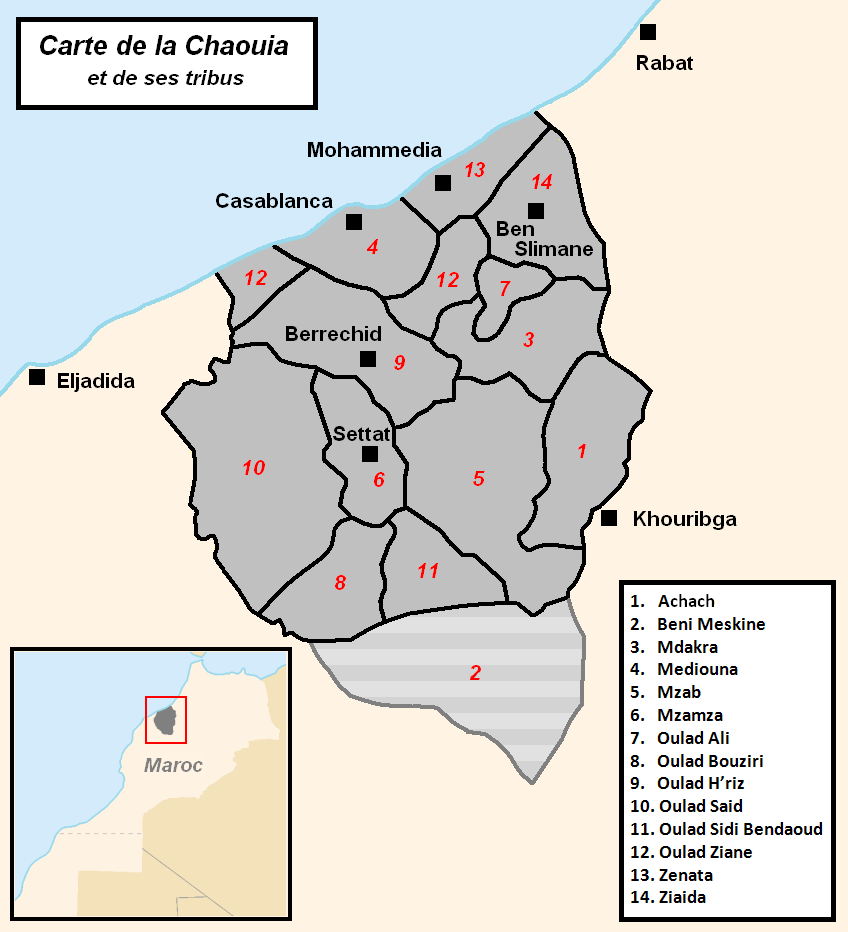
Map of the Chaouia and its tribes

The Chaouia (Arabic: الشاوية, romanized: Shāwiyya) is a plain and historical and ethno-geographical region of Morocco in the historical region of Tamesna. It is bounded by the Oum er-Rbi' River to its southwest, the Cherrate River to its northeast, the plain of Tadla to the southeast and the Atlantic Ocean to the northwest. The region covers a land area of nearly 14 000 km^{2}. The term also refers to a tribal confederation that traditionally inhabits the region.

== Etymology ==
The word "Chaouia" means "Land of Chaouis", transliterated in French. "Chaoui" (Arabic: شاوي, romanized: shāwī) is an Arabic word meaning "possessors of sheep" or "shepherds". Some groups of Chaouis claim that the term come from the Arabic term shwiya (شوية) meaning "few" despite the region now having a comparatively high population density to other regions in Morocco. Others say it is derived from shewa meaning "grilled meat" or a distortion of Chehawna which was the name of a tribal alliance.

== Geography ==
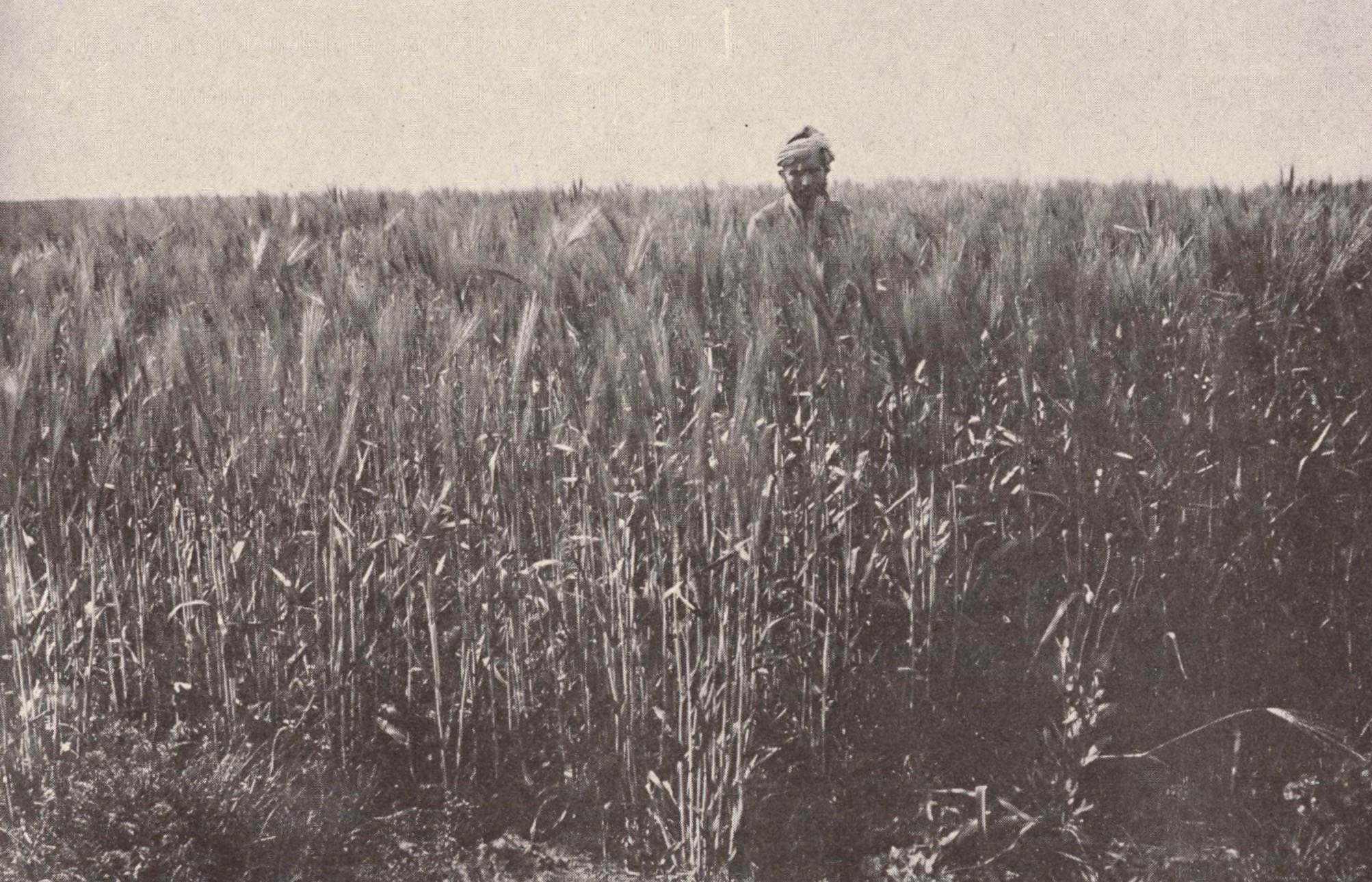
A farmer in a field of barley in the Chaouia, published August 15, 1917 in the magazine France-Maroc.

Geographically, the Chaouia can be divided into two sub-regions: low and high. The low Chaouia being the coastal part while the high Chaouia is further inland. Soils vary in fertility: The dark tirs is prized for its high yields and is found among the Mdhakra, Ouled Hriz and Oulad said. There is also the red hamri terra rossa.

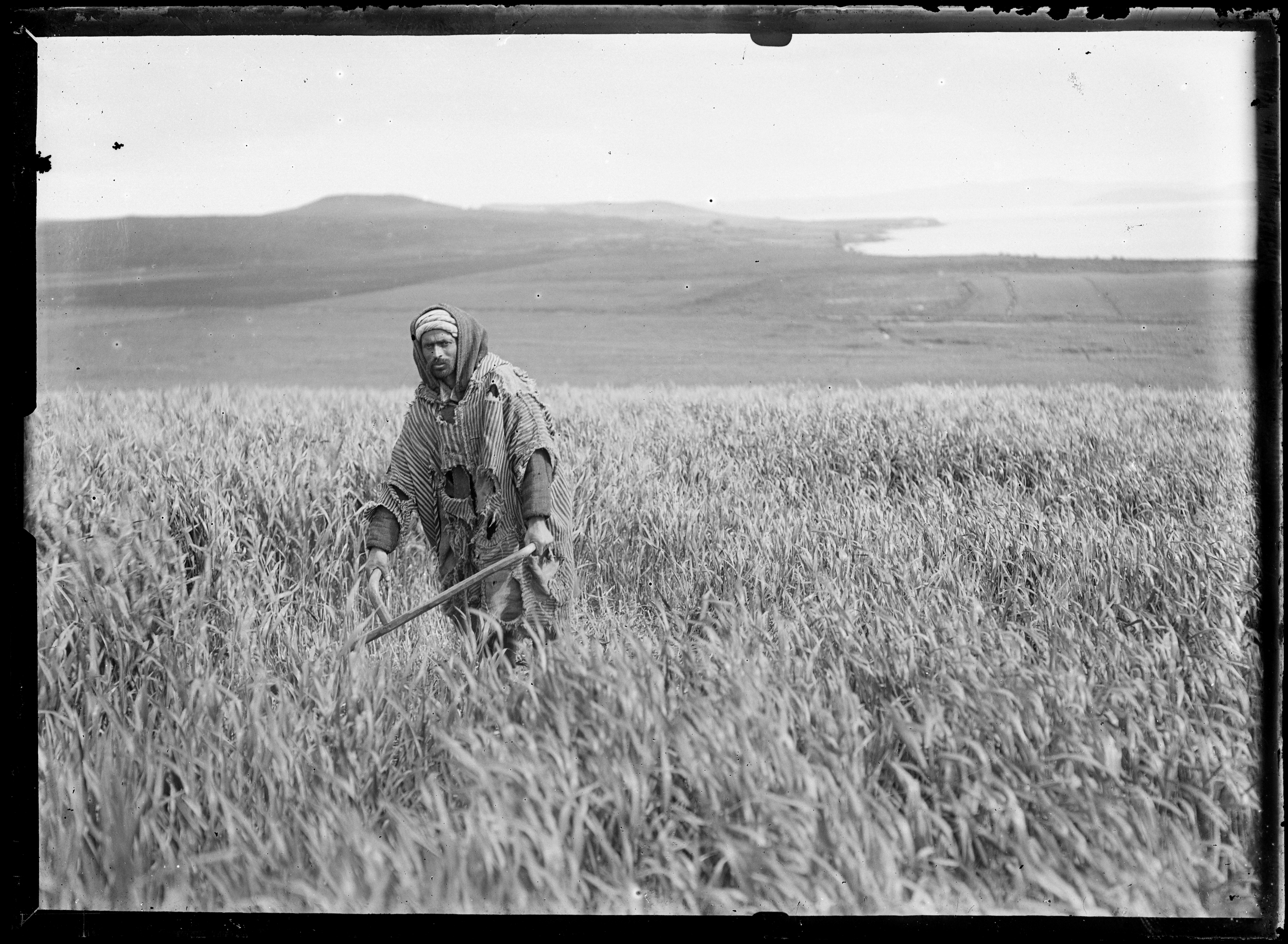
A man holding a scythe in the middle of a barley field, 1909

Throughout Morocco's history, the Chaouia was famous for farming wheat and barley, which were exported in years of abundance from Casablanca, Fédala or Azemmour. Chaouia sheep was also prized for its wool, which was also exported to Marseille where it was known as wardigha in reference to one of the tribes in the interior.

Nowadays, the Chaouia is part of the Casablanca-Settat administrative region.

== History ==
Originally, the Chaouia was ruled by the Barghawata until it was annexed by the Almoravids, depopulating the area. After the Almohad ruler Abd al-Mu'min captured the town of Marrakesh in 1147, he encouraged the settlement of Bedouin Arab tribes in the area and the rest of the Moroccan coastal plains which were largely depopulated after the Almoravid conquest, including Banu Hilal, Banu Sulaym, and Banu Ma'qil, which led to a further extension of Arabic and an increased importance of Arab elements in the power equation of Morocco, to the point where no one could have ruled there without their co-operation.

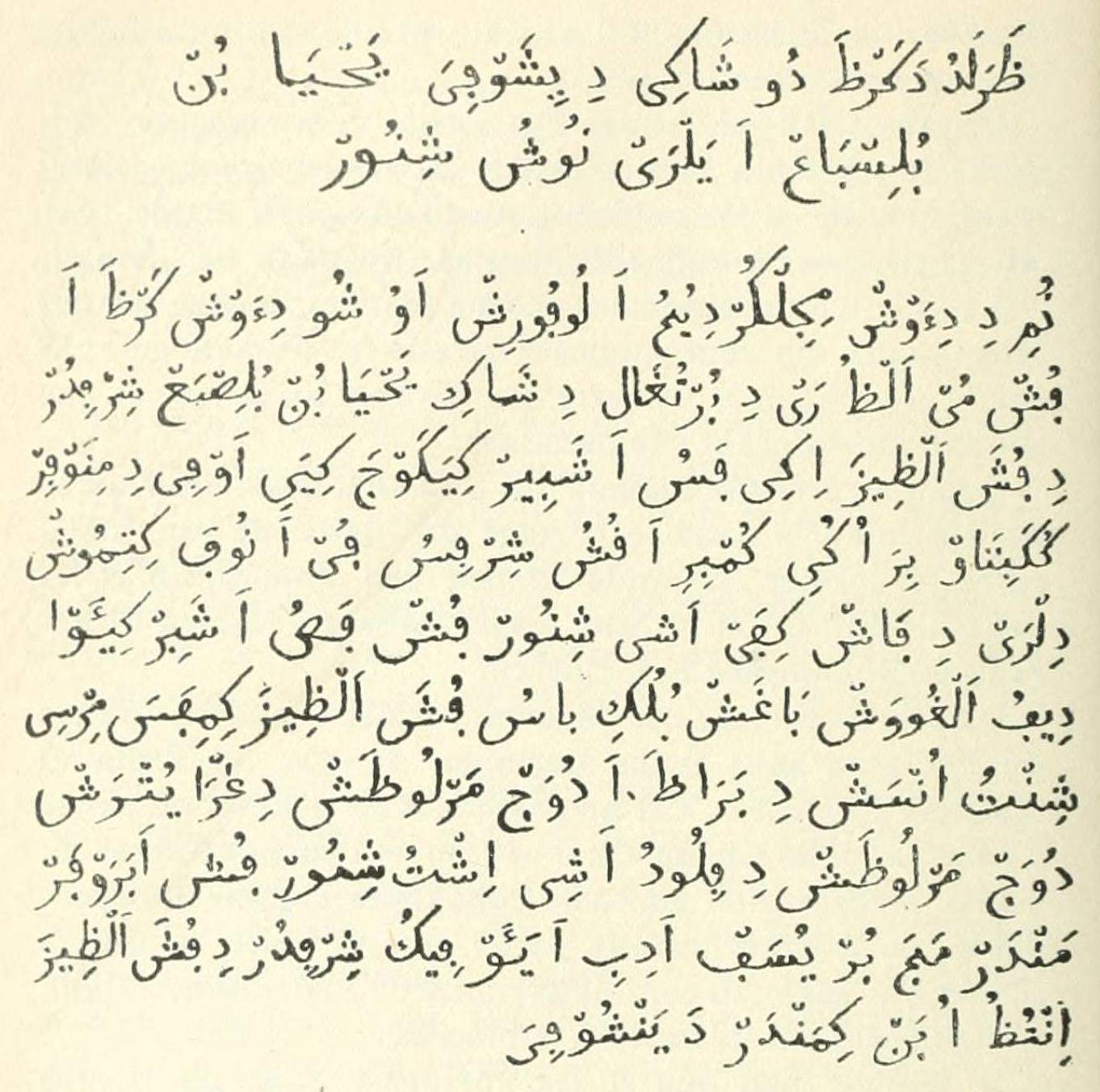
A record of a letter in Portuguese aljamía—early Portuguese written in Arabic script—sent from Sheikh Yahya ben Bulisbé of the Shawiya to the King of Portugal, found in the archives of Torre do Tombo.

Portuguese colonists called the region Enxovía. An undated letter sent from Sheikh Yahya ben Bulisbé (يحيى بن بلسباع) of the Shawiya to the King of Portugal indicates that the Sheikh cooperated with the Portuguese and that the sultans of Fes held tenuous authority in the region.

The Saadi Sultan Abu Marwan Abd al-Malik I Saadi occupied the region during the Battle of Alcácer Quibir and leveraged the mujahideen against his nephew Abu Abdallah Mohammed who had sought the support of the Portuguese.

Caids of the Chaouia, 14 July 1908

From 1907 to 1908, the Chaouia tribes carried out a strong rebellion against the French known as the Chaouia campaign. In 1907, the French bombarded Casablanca and entered the Chaouia region before extending their control over all of Morocco. The Chaouia campaign was the first time since the Battle of Isly that the French and Moroccans engaged with each other in the battlefield. The French landing in Chaouia led the Chaouia tribes to hold several assemblies (leading political figure Abu Azzawi who was a sharif from the Mzab played an important role) leading to them sending a letter to Abd al-Hafid of Morocco to take action and restore Islam from the state that it had fallen. This sparked the beginning of the Hafidiya. When Abd al-Hafid received the letter and notables met up at the Dar al-Makhzen, several speakers spoke about the situation in Chaouia causing Abd al-Hafid's mother, who was from the Chaouia, to burst into tears.

During the French protectorate, the Chaouia was part of the "Autonomous subdivision of Casablanca". It was then divided into three civilians controls : Chaouia-North (Casablanca), Chaouia-Center (Berrechid) and Chaouia-South (Settat).

== Scientific Studies ==
A study titled "Genetically Modified Immune Pattern System among Berbers and Arabs in Morocco" revealed that the region's inhabitants exhibit genetic diversity similar to that of other North African populations. Despite geographical and cultural distinctions among the populations, the study found no significant genetic differences between Amazigh-speaking groups and Arabic speakers, including those from the Chaouia region. The samples demonstrated genetic affinity with populations in southwestern Europe and a marked divergence from populations in sub-Saharan Africa.

== Tribal composition ==
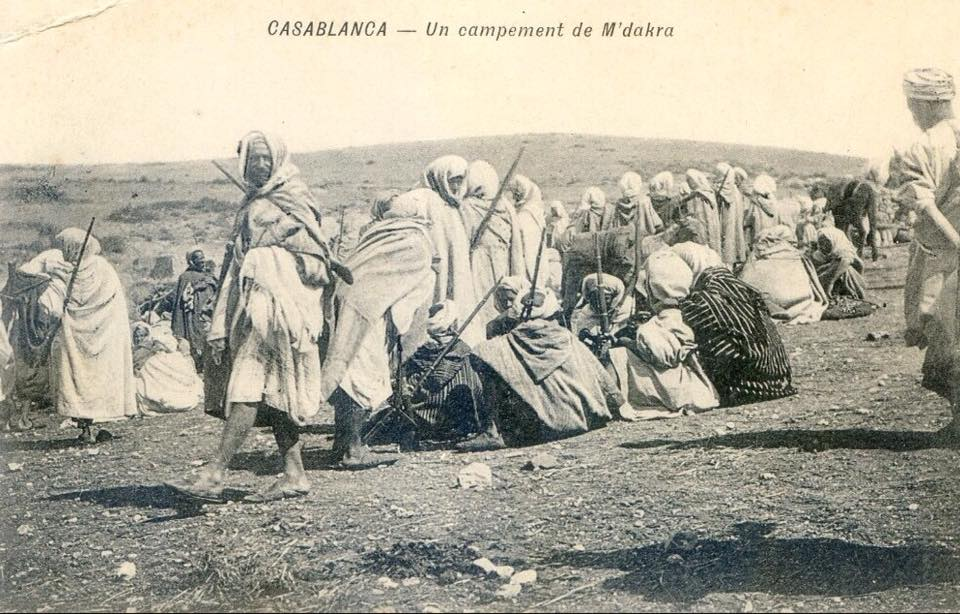
Men from the Mdakra tribe

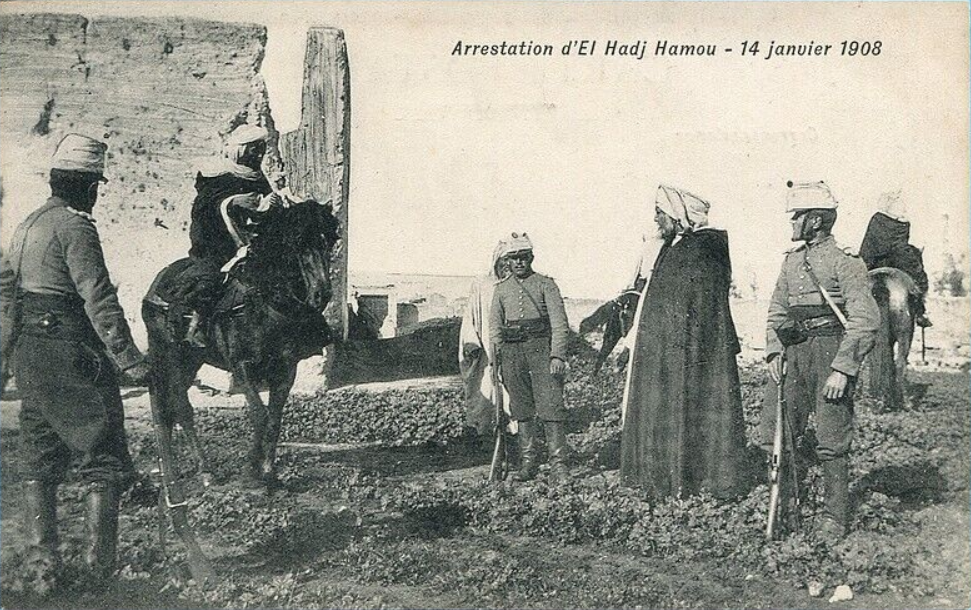
Arrest of Hajj Hammou, qaid of the Oulad Hriz

The Chaouia tribal confederation come from a variety of Arab and Berber origins, although today they are linguistically Arabized. The Chaouia, alongside other regions in the Atlantic plains like Doukkala and Chiadma, are inhabited by a group known as ʕrubis. The ʕrubis are ethnically Bedouin and are believed to descend from Bedouin tribes that migrated into North Africa in the 11th–13th century. "ʕrubi" has in recent times also adopted a more general meaning of rural alongside its ethnic meaning due to Bedouins traditionally inhabiting the countryside and thus coming to symbolise everything that has a rural character. A French survey of Moroccan tribes published in 1915 reported that all of these tribes claimed a pure Arab origin. In a modern study done on a group of families of the Mzab who migrated to Umbria, anthropologist Alessandra Persichetti found that the majority affirmed their Arab identity even though some had a Berber parent. The Chaouia tribal confederation traditionally consists of 14 Arabic-speaking tribes. Their origins according to colonial-era French orientalist Édouard Michaux-Bellaire is as follows:

Tribe	Origin	Notes
Achach	Arab (Banu Sulaym)	
Beni Meskin	Arab	Previously part of the Tadla confederacy, joined the Chaouia in the 19th century.
Mdakra	Arab (Ahlaf and Sabbah) and Berber (Hawwara)	Merged with a Barghawata original group.
Mediouna	Berber (Zenata)	
Mzab	Berber (Zenata)	
Mzamza	Mainly Berber (Masmuda) origin, with some later Arab (Zughba) elements	
Oulad Ali	Arab (Banu Ma'qil)	
Oulad Bouziri	Berber (Sanhaja)	
Oulad Hriz	Mainly Arab with Berber origins, due to subtribes	
Oulad Saïd	Arab (Zughba, Banu Hilal)	Settled in the region during the Marinid era
Oulad Sidi Bendaoud	Mainly Berber (Sanhaja)	
Oulad Zyan	Arab (Zughba, Banu Hilal)	
Zenata	Berber (Zenata)	
Zyayda	Berber (Sanhaja)	

== Bibliography ==
- F. Weisberger, Casablanca et les Chaouia en 1900, Ed. Impr. Réunies (Casablanca), 1935
- E. Marchand, Casablanca, la Chaouia, Ed. Larose (Paris), 1918
