= Zohra Al Fassiya =

Moroccan singer and poet (1905–1994)

Zohra Al Fassiya زهرة الفاسية
- Zohra El Fassia in a dress gifted to her by King Mohammed V, photo likely taken within the museum exhibit on North Africa in 1965. From Tallia Amos family album, courtesy of Tallia Amos.

Background information
- Born: 1905; Sefrou, Morocco
- Origin: Morocco
- Died: 1994 (aged 88–89) Ashkelon, Israel
- Genres: Malhun, Moroccan music
- Occupation: Singer

Zohra Al Fassiya (Arabic: زهرة الفاسية, Hebrew: זוהרה אלפסיה) was a Moroccan singer and poet. Considered as the queen of the chgouri, malhoun and gharnati genres, and one of the pioneers of modern Moroccan music, she was the first female recording artist in Morocco. Her songs were known throughout Morocco and Algeria, where she collaborated with lyricists and musicians from Oran and Tlemcen. Although her songs were mostly secular in nature (being the popular music of the time in Morocco), many of the melodies have later been modified to befit religious Jewish liturgical songs (called piyyutim) as well.

== Early life and education ==
Al Fassiya was born in Sefrou, near Fez, at the feet of the mountains of Atlas in a modest Moroccan Jewish family. Her father was a butcher and a hazzan. She went to a primary school supported by the Alliance Israelite Universelle, a French organization with the aim of educating Jews of the Maghreb. She married young, around age 13, had to leave school and soon had the first of three children. Around age 18 she was divorced and moved to Casablanca to pursue her career. The children remained with the husband. In Casablanca she had a relationship with a married man and had two daughters.

== Singing career ==
She started to sing at a very early age when she performed religious songs at her synagogue. During her youth, she started to sing in coffee houses and cabarets near towns and in Casablanca. Her songs were mostly secular gharnati songs (Andalusian Arabic songs originally from Granada, Spain, and very popular among the Muslims of Andalusian background and Moroccan and Algerian Jews in the 19th century), as well as Malhun, which are long Moroccan poems.

During the 1940s, she had her own orchestra and started to write her own songs. She was heavily aired on radio stations, both in Morocco and Algeria, and was extremely well known and loved by the public. Al Fassiya's Jewish identity was not considered to be problematic in Morocco during the height of her fame. In fact, the King of Morocco, Mohammed V, was so impressed by her voice that he invited her to sing at his court. Al Fassiya also worked with other artists such as Samy Elmaghribi, who wrote some of her songs. She released more than 17 albums between the years 1947-1957.

== Emigration to Israel ==
In 1962, following many fellow Mizrahi Jews who fled Arab countries due to mounting persecution following the establishment of the State of Israel, Al Fassiya immigrated to Israel. Despite her superstar status in Morocco and North Africa, Al Fassiya's talent went unrecognized in Israel outside of the Moroccan immigrant community, as the state-run media and cultural institutions preferred to promote Western sounding music. As with many Mizrahi immigrants (Jews from Arab and Islamic countries), Al Fassiya faced discrimination in Israel, and she came to live in miserable and lonely conditions in Ashkelon. Despite this humiliating fate, Al Fassiya was often invited to sing at private celebrations (such as weddings) in the Moroccan community in Israel. Israeli-Moroccan poet Erez Biton, who visited her when he was employed as a social worker, was so moved by her fate that he dedicated a poem to her story; this poem has now been added to the national school curriculum in Israel, and serves as a centrepiece in discussion of the state's harsh Westernization policies in the 20th century.

In her last years, Zohra Al Fassiya lived in a nursing home in Ashkelon. She died at age 89 in 1994 and was buried there.
