= Mzab (Moroccan tribe) =

Mzab, Moroccan clan

Mzab (Arabic: مزاب) is a tribal confederation in Morocco (south of Casablanca), located in Ben Ahmed, which serves as its historical capital, part of the Chaouia region. In a modern study done on a group of families of the Mzab who migrated to Umbria, anthropologist Alessandra Persichetti found that the majority affirmed their Arab identity even though some had a Berber parent. According to French colonial-era orientalist Édouard Michaux-Bellaire, the Mzab are of Zenata origin.

Located in the fertile lands of the Chaouia, Mzab is historically centered in Ben Ahmed and its surrounding areas. The capital Ben Ahmed lies about 70 south of Casablanca, 39 km from Berrechid, 40 km from Settat, and 83 km from Beni Mellal. The land is mainly used for wheat production and sheep husbandry, with Sardy being the most common sheep breed. The plateau where Mzab is located is also nicknamed Al-'Alwa (Arabic: العلوة), meaning "height," and forms part of Morocco's major phosphate-producing regions. The capital of Mzab is Ben Ahmed.

Mzab is made up many smaller tribes, the most important of which are:

- Ben Ahmed (Capital)
- Sidi Hajjaj
- Ras El Ain Chaouia
- Hamdawa حمداوة
- Oulad Mrah
- Khzazra الخزازرة
- Oulad Jabi
- Oulad Fares اولاد فارس
- Beni Brahim بني براهيم
- Maarif المعاريف
- Mkhalkhliya المخلخلية
- Oulad Belbagi اولاد بلباجى
- Beni Arif بني عريف

There was also a Jewish presence in Mzab. The Jews left in the 1950s and 1960s during the independence movements; most setled in Israel. The Mellah الملاح and the Hajraat الحجرات (rocks in Arabic) still testify of this presence. Jewish tourists from amongst the Moroccan diaspora still visit the Hajraat sites every year. The site is a few kilometres from the Shrine of Sidi Mohamed El Fekkak, where an annual "Moussem" harvest festival is hosted.
