= Chaabi (Morocco) =

Music genre

Chaabi (Arabic: شعبي, romanized: shaʻbī, lit. 'popular') refers to several types of popular music of Morocco, combining rural and urban folk music. It is performed in Moroccan Arabic.

The genre started out as street music performed in squares and souks, and can be heard in cafés, restaurants, and weddings.

Chaabi is commonly associated with the culture of the aroubi, which is a pejorative term to describe people of Arab descent, as well as meaning peasant and uneducated, as opposed to the Fassi (lit. 'from Fez', but also including anyone who adopts an elitist culture), who prefer Andalusian music and the malhun.

Rural varieties include Jerra and al-Aïta (Note: Some ethnomusicologists argue it is a separate genre rather than a type of chaabi.) (lit. 'the cry').

Several artists performing this genre are known, such as Hajib, Abdelaziz Stati, Najat Aatabou, Saïd Senhaji, and Khalid Bennani.
