= Malhun =

Popular form of poetic expression in Maghreb

- Native name: الملحون (Arabic) ⵍⵎⵍⵃⵓⵏ (Standard Moroccan Tamazight)
- Stylistic origins: Moroccan music

Malhun, a popular poetic and musical art
- UNESCO Intangible Cultural Heritage
- Country: Morocco
- Reference: 01592
- Region: Arab States

Inscription history
- Inscription: 2023 (18th session)
- List: Representative

Part of the Malhun song "Lalla Ghita Moulati" performed by the artist Adnane Sefiani in a wedding in Salé, Morocco - November 2025

Malhun (Note: Arabic: الملحون, romanized: al-malḥūn Standard Moroccan Tamazight: ⵍⵎⵍⵃⵓⵏ), meaning 'the melodic poem', is a form of music that originated in Morocco. It is a kind of urban, sung poetry that comes from the exclusively masculine working-class milieu of craftsmen's guilds. On 6 December 2023, malhun was added to the UNESCO Intangible Cultural Heritage Lists of Morocco.

== Origins ==
The mǝlḥun first emerged as a pure literary creation, as a poetic genre today known in Morocco under the name of "qasida" (meaning "poem") (Arabic: القصيدة) or "zajal" (Arabic: الزجل). It developed in the Tafilalet oases of southern Morocco in the fifteenth century before it spread to other parts of the Maghreb.

The Mal’aba of Al-Kafif az-Zarhuni (ملعبة الكفيف الزرهوني) is considered to be the oldest known form of the Malhun, dating back to the Marinid dynasty era (14th century). The Mal’aba describes the union's attempt of the Maghreb by the sultan Abu al-Hasan Ali ibn Othman. Written in Moroccan Arabic, it represents the origins of the modern Malhun. Ibn Khaldun mentions it at the end of his Muqaddimah as one of the main lyrical epics of the art called "Mala'ib" (ملاعب).

== Music ==
The qasida (qṣīda in Moroccan Arabic) of the malhun is based on two essential elements: the overtures preceding it and the parts of which it is composed: aqsam (Arabic: الأقسام) verses sung solo interrupted by the harba refrain (meaning launch) (Arabic: الحربة). Harba, the origin of which goes back to the 16th century, is a refrain taken up between the verses. Another refrain called drīdka (Arabic: الدريدكة) is a simplified form of the harba, taking off from an accelerated rhythm to announce the end of a qasida.

== Famous figures ==
Among the former authors of malhun lyrics, there are Abdelaziz al-Maghrawi and Abderrahman El Majdoub (died 1568), who was famous for his mystical quatrains. In the 18th and 19th centuries, Morocco saw a great number of poets who, whether from Fez, Meknes or Marrakesh, spread popular poetry by melhun. Examples are Kaddour El Alamy and Thami Midaghri.

Since the 20th century, prominent malhun singers have included Zohra Al Fassiya, Haj Houcine Toulali (1924-1998), and Fatima Hadad. Fatima Hadad started an association in 2004 named Jawg Huwwat fann al-malhun for enthusiasts of Malhun.

== See also ==
- Arabic music
- Music of Morocco
- Andalusi classical music
