= Aita (Morocco) =

Bedouin style of Arabic folk music from rural Morocco

- Stylistic origins: Chaabi
- Cultural origins: Moroccan music
- Typical instruments: Frame drum; Fiddles

Regional scenes
- Jebala, Khouribga, Chaouia, Abda, Marrakesh

Aita (Note: also written as haita, rita or ghita; Arabic: عيطة, romanized: ʻAyṭa, lit. 'call, cry or lament') or vocal shikhat music is a traditional folk musical style that originates from the countryside of Morocco. It is sung in Moroccan Arabic by women called shikhat (Note: literally meaning a female leader, shikha in singular feminine) who are typically accompanied by male musicians on fiddles and drums. In Morocco, the Aita Festival is organized in Safi which is the city most known for Aita.

== Origins ==
Aita came with the arrival of Arab tribes like the Banu Hilal to Morocco in the 12th century. It has been influenced by Amazigh culture.

== Notable Aita singers ==
- Fatna Bent Lhoucine
- Mohamed Benomar Ziani
- Kharbusha, whose actual name was Hadda or Hawida, was a woman from the Awlad Zayd, a fraction of the Bhatra tribe belonging to the Abda. She was an Aita singer who sang songs in support of her tribe against colonialism and the tyranny of the ruling governor of the region, Isa ibn Umar al-Abdi, who confiscated land and horses from the Awlad Zayd as well as disarming them. An example of a line from one of her songs is:

Let's rise in rebellion until we reach the bukshur
Let's rise in rebellion until we reach the door of Si Qaddur
