= List of Moroccan films =

This is a list of films produced in Morocco.

Title	Date of release	Director	Genre
475	2013-02-18	Nadir Bouhmouch	documentary film
A Mile in My Shoes	2016-06-17		
A Thousand Months	2003	Faouzi Bensaïdi	drama film
Aida	2015	Driss Mrini	
Alyam, Alyam	1978	Ahmed El Maanouni	Drama
Ali Zaoua	2000; 2002-03-14	Nabil Ayouch	crime film drama film
All I Wanna Do	2011		documentary film
Alyam Alyam O les jours aka Oh the days	1978	Ahmed El Maanouni	drama film
Amok	1983	Souheil Ben-Barka	
Ashlaa	2010		documentary film
Atlantic.	2014-09-08; 2015-06-25	Jan-Willem van Ewijk	drama film
Between Desire and Uncertainty	2010	Abdelkader Lagtaâ	documentary film
Blood Wedding	1977	Souheil Ben-Barka	drama film
Burnout	2017	Nour Eddine	drama film
Casanegra	2008	Nour Eddine	film noir
Charkhun fi-l hâ'it (A Hole in the Wall)	1978	Jillali Ferhati	
Children of the Sun	1962	Jacques Séverac	
Death for Sale	2011-09-12	Faouzi Bensaïdi	drama film
Divine Intervention	2002	Elia Suleiman	drama film comedy film
DP75: Tartina City	2006	Issa Serge Coelo	
Fatma	2009		
Fissures	2009-12-07	Hicham Ayouch	drama film
Française	2008	Souad El-Bouhati	
Goodbye Mothers	2008	Mohamed Ismaïl	drama film
Headbang Lullaby	2017-02-12	Hisham Lasri	
Horses of God	2012-05-19; 2012	Nabil Ayouch	drama film film adaptation
J'ai tant aimé...	2008		documentary film
J'ai vu tuer Ben Barka	2005	Serge Le Péron	drama film
Le Grand Voyage (1981)	1981	Mohamed Abderrahman Tazi	
La guerre du pétrole n'aura pas lieu	1975	Souheil Ben-Barka	
Al Kanfoudi	1978	Nabyl Lahlou	
Le Dernier cri	2006		
Le Grand Voyage	2004; 2005-11-24	Ismaël Ferroukhi	drama film road movie coming-of-age story
Les Anges de Satan	2007	Ahmed Boulane	
Les Coeurs brûlés	2007	Ahmed El Maanouni	drama film
Les Damnés de la mer	2008		documentary film
Looking for Oum Kulthum	2017; 2018-06-07; 2018-06-15	Shirin Neshat	
Marie-Chantal contre le docteur Kha	1965	Claude Chabrol	
Marock	2005	Laïla Marrakchi	
Marouf, the Cairo Cobbler	1947		
Mimosas	2016-05-16	Oliver Laxe	drama film
Moolaadé	2004-05-15; 2006-05-11	Ousmane Sembène	drama film
Much Loved	2015; 2016-04-14	Nabil Ayouch	drama film
My Makhzen and Me	2012		documentary film
L’Oiseau du paradis	1981	Hamid Bensaïd	
On the Edge	2011	Leila Kilani	drama film
Our Forbidden Places	2008	Leila Kilani	documentary film
Parcours de réfugiés	2009	Ali Benjelloun	documentary film
Poupées de roseau	1981	Jilali Ferhati	
Queen of the Desert	2015; 2015-09-03; 2017-04-14	Werner Herzog	biographical film drama film
Razzia	2017	Nabil Ayouch	drama film
Rock the Casbah	2013-08-23	Laïla Marrakchi	drama film comedy film
Starve Your Dog	2015	Hisham Lasri	
Testament	2004	Hassan Legzouli	
The Beach of Lost Children	1991	Jillali Ferhati	drama film
The Damned Don't Cry	2022	Fyzal Boulifa	drama film
The Mosque	2010	Daoud Aoulad-Syad	
The Red Moon	2013		
The Sea Is Behind	2014	Hisham Lasri	
The Silence's Echo	2010		documentary film
The Source	2011	Radu Mihăileanu	drama film comedy film
Trances	1981	Ahmed El Maânouni	
Un novio para Yasmina	2008-07-11		
Where Are You Going Moshé?	2007	Hassan Benjelloun	
