= List of Moroccan submissions for the Academy Award for Best International Feature Film =

Best International Feature Film submissions from Morocco

Highlights
- Debut: 1977
- Submissions: 22
- Nominations: none
- Oscar winners: none

Morocco has submitted films intermittently for the Academy Award for Best International Feature Film (Note: The category was previously named the Academy Award for Best Foreign Language Film, but this was changed to the Academy Award for Best International Feature Film in April 2019, after the Academy deemed the word "Foreign" to be outdated.) since 1977. The award is handed out annually by the United States Academy of Motion Picture Arts and Sciences to a feature-length motion picture produced outside the United States that contains primarily non-English dialogue.

As of 2026, Morocco has submitted twenty-two films, but none of them were nominated.

== Submissions ==
The Academy of Motion Picture Arts and Sciences has invited the film industries of various countries to submit their best film for the Academy Award for Best International Feature Film since 1956. The International Feature Film Committee oversees the process and reviews all the submitted films. Following this, they vote via secret ballot to determine the five nominees for the award.

Blood Wedding (1977), directed by Souheil Ben-Barka, was the country first official submission.

Omar Killed Me (2011), The Blue Caftan (2022), and The Mother of All Lies (2023) advanced to the December shortlists, but were not nominated.

Most of the films are primary in Arabic and French. Below is a list of the films that have been submitted by Morocco for review by the academy for the award by year and the respective Academy Awards ceremony.

Year (Ceremony)	Film title used in nomination	Original title	Director(s)	Result
1977 (50th)	Blood Wedding	عرس الدم	Souheil Ben-Barka	Not nominated
1998 (71st)	Mektoub	مكتوب	Nabil Ayouch	Not nominated
2000 (73rd)	Ali Zaoua: Prince of the Streets	علي زاوا	Nabil Ayouch	Not nominated
2006 (79th)	The Moroccan Symphony	السمفونية المغربية	Kamal Kamal	Not nominated
2008 (81st)	Goodbye Mothers	وداعا أمهات	Mohamed Ismaïl	Not nominated
2009 (82nd)	Casanegra	كازانيكرا	Nour-Eddine Lakhmari	Not nominated
2011 (84th)	Omar Killed Me	عمر قتلني	Roschdy Zem	Made shortlist
2012 (85th)	Death for Sale	موت للبيع	Faouzi Bensaïdi	Not nominated
2013 (86th)	Horses of God	يا خيل الله	Nabil Ayouch	Not nominated
2014 (87th)	The Red Moon	القمر الأحمر	Hassan Benjelloun	Not nominated
2015 (88th)	Aida	عايدة	Driss Mrini	Not nominated
2016 (89th)	A Mile in My Shoes	مسافة ميل بحذائي	Said Khallaf	Not nominated
2017 (90th)	Razzia	غزية	Nabil Ayouch	Not nominated
2018 (91st)	Burnout	بورن أوت	Nour-Eddine Lakhmari	Not nominated
2019 (92nd)	Adam	آدم	Maryam Touzani	Not nominated
2020 (93rd)	The Unknown Saint	القديس المجهول	Alaa Eddine Aljem	Not nominated
2021 (94th)	Casablanca Beats	علي صوتك	Nabil Ayouch	Not nominated
2022 (95th)	The Blue Caftan	أزرق القفطان	Maryam Touzani	Made shortlist
2023 (96th)	The Mother of All Lies	كذب أبيض	Asmae El Moudir	Made shortlist
2024 (97th)	Everybody Loves Touda	في حب تودا	Nabil Ayouch	Not nominated
2025 (98th)	Calle Málaga		Maryam Touzani	Not nominated
2026 (99th)	Strawberries	La más dulce / الفراولة	Laïla Marrakchi	Pending

== See also ==
- List of Academy Award winners and nominees for Best International Feature Film
- List of Academy Award-winning foreign language films
