= Fatima Hernadi =

Moroccan actress (born 1951)

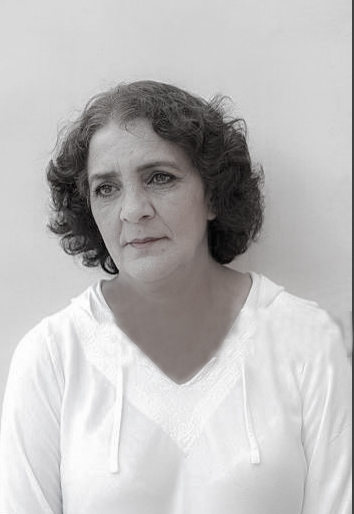
- Born: 1951 (age 74–75); Azemmour, Morocco
- Other names: Raouia
- Occupation: Actor

Fatima Hernadi (born 1951 in Azemmour) is a Moroccan actress better known as "Raouia".

== Biography ==
Fatima Hernadi was born in Azemmour. She moved to Casablanca to complete her studies at chawki High School, where she joined the theater band Mansour, with which she won the award for Best Actress at the National Amateur Theatre Festival in the play Failers. Until 1978, she worked in cinema, with director Mohamed El Abazi, in his film, "Treasures of Atlas. after that, she participated in a film called Dry Eyes starring Narjiss Nejjar in 2004, a role that launched her into the Moroccan cinema.

In 2014, she won the Best Actress award at the National Film Festival for her film Saga, The Story of Men Who Never Come Back. Afterward, she was selected as a member of the jury of the 16th edition of the Marrakech International Film Festival.

== Filmography ==
=== Films ===
Year	Title
1997	Atlas Treasures
2000	Story of a Rose
2003	Al Ouyoune Al Jaffa
2008	Casanegra
2009	Mashouq Al Shaytan
2012	Zero
2012	Androman – Blood and Coal
2013	Sarir Al Asrar
2013	Rock the Casbah
2014	Formatage
2014	SAGA, The Story of The Men Who Never Come Back
2015	Massafat Mile Bihidayi
2015	Aya Wa El Bahr
2015	Des Espoirs
2017	Burnout
2017	Lhajjates
2018	Masood Saida Wa Saadan
2018	Kilikis Douar Lboum
2018	The Doors of the Sky

=== Series ===
Year	Title
2016	Cairo-blanca
2017	Rdat Lwalida
2019	Rdat Lwalida 2
2020	Heya
2021	Dayer El Buzz
2021	Al Boyout Asrar
2022	Captain Hajiba
2022	Salamat Abu Al Banat 4
2022	Jerit W Jarite
2023	Kayna Dorouf
