= Zero (2012 film) =

2012 film by Nour-Eddine Lakhmari

- Theatrical release poster
- Directed by: Nour-Eddine Lakhmari
- Written by: Nour-Eddine Lakhmari
- Produced by: Redouan Bayed
- Starring: Younes Bouab; Mohamed Majd; Sonia Okasha; Aziz Dadas; Said Bey
- Cinematography: Luca Coassin
- Edited by: Youssef Mernissi
- Music by: Richard Horowitz
- Production company: Timlif Productions
- Distributed by: H2O Motion Pictures
- Release date: 19 December 2012
- Running time: 111 minutes
- Country: Morocco
- Language: Moroccan Arabic

Zero is a 2012 Moroccan neo-noir thriller film written and directed by Nour-Eddine Lakhmari and produced by Redouan Bayed, It stars Younes Bouab, Mohamed Majd, Sonia Okasha, Aziz Dadas and Said Bey. The film follows Amine Bertal, nicknamed "Zero" an insecure, alcoholic cop who spends much of his time recording statements from complainants or wandering the streets and bars of Casablanca with Mimi, a 22-year-old prostitute. His investigation into the disappearance of a girl leads him into a confrontation that exposes the city’s darkest side.

Released in Morocco on 19 December 2012, as the second installment in Nour-Eddine Lakhmari’s Casablanca Trilogy, following Casanegra.

The film was a box office success in Morocco. It was screened at a number of international film festivals, and took away the Grand Prize at the Tangier National Film Festival, among other prizes.

== Plot ==
Amine Bertal is a troubled young cop whom his colleagues nickname "Zero", believing him to be a failure who lacks competence and the ability to prove himself. Amine leads a miserable life, torn between the demands of his profession and the burden of caring for his paralyzed father, who constantly hurls insults and curses at him and reminds him of how his mother abandoned him as a child by running away with another man, leaving him to fend for himself. The father finds solace in his present existence only by reminiscing about his former service in the Auxiliary Forces and his participation in the Green March, retreating into a past that grows increasingly distant from their reality, one burdened by disappointment and disillusionment.

At night, "Zero" roams the underworld of Casablanca, struggling to navigate a landscape marked by urban violence, police corruption, and stark social inequalities between families struggling to make ends meet and the kingpins of the drug trade and prostitution, as well as corrupt officials. His corrupt superior, Chief Inspector Zerouali, has demoted him after Amine began investigating him and questioning his shady activities, stripping him of his service pistol and assigning him to tedious desk work, limited to drafting police reports on a battered typewriter.

Amine’s suffering continues until one day, a woman comes to his office seeking help in finding her missing daughter. He feels compelled to help her but fears overstepping the professional boundaries imposed on him by Zerouali. Instead, he continues to drown his sorrows in alcohol and frequent bars in an attempt to silence his nagging conscience. Meanwhile, he meets a doctor from a higher social class, and the two embark on a romantic relationship that ultimately founders on their differences. Following his father’s death, Amine is left with a profound sense of emptiness that drives him to seek out an opportunity to do one genuinely good thing, whatever the cost.

Amine launches an investigation and uncovers an extensive criminal network operating within Casablanca’s underworld, running a high-end prostitution ring that exploits underage girls while concealing its activities behind the façade of lavish parties and exclusive entertainment events. Amine suspects that Chief Inspector Zerouali is involved in the network, a suspicion his investigation confirms. He tracks down its members and eventually discovers the secret location serving as their den of operations. There, he encounters Zerouali, and a confrontation erupts between them, ending with Amine killing the chief inspector. Amine then discovers that the girl her mother has been searching for is among the underage victims exploited by the network. He engages in a series of violent confrontations that culminate in the destruction of the criminal operation and the girl’s rescue. He subsequently returns her unharmed to her mother.

It seems that Amine’s life is finally returning to some semblance of normality. However, a tattoo artist connected to the criminal network, seeking revenge after Amine damaged one of his prized works of art during the investigation, stabs him. "Zero" collapses in the street, dead.

== Cast ==
- Younes Bouab as Amine Bertale aka Zero
- Mohamed Majd as Abbas, Amine's father
- Sonia Okasha as Dr. Kenza
- Said Bey as Boufertatou
- Zineb Samara as Mimi
- Aziz Dadas as Chief Zerouali
- Malika Hamaoui as Aicha Baïdou
- Ouidad Elma as Nadia Baïdou

== Production ==
The film was written and directed by Nour-Eddine Lakhmari. It is his third feature film and the second in his series of films exploring urban violence and corruption in the city of Casablanca, following Casanegra (2008). Work on the film took two years, encompassing both screenwriting and filming. It was produced by Timlif Productions, with Redouane Bayed serving as producer. In 2009, the project received an advance on receipts from the Moroccan Cinematographic Center (CCM) amounting to approximately MAD 4.5 million, while the production company covered the remainder of the budget. Most of the film's scenes were shot in Casablanca.

== Release ==
Zero was released theatrically in Morocco on 19 December 2012, following several postponements of its release date. Its theatrical release in Morocco covered several cities, including Casablanca, Rabat, Marrakesh, Tangier, Tetouan, Fez, and Meknes.

The film was screened at the Hamburg International Film Festival in Germany on 29 September 2013. It also participated in the Valladolid International Film Festival in Spain in October of the same year. It was released theatrically in France on 4 December 2013, following its presentation as part of the «Maghreb des films» event in Paris, held from 20 November to 4 December 2013.

Regarding home and digital distribution, the film became available for home viewing via video on demand (VOD) on 15 July 2024.

== Reception ==
=== Box office ===
Zero attracted a considerable audience in Moroccan cinemas. In January 2013, TelQuel reported that the film had sold approximately 45,000 tickets during its first three weeks of release and was being screened in around ten cinemas. In February 2013, Le Matin reported that the film had sold approximately 170,000 tickets during December 2012 and January 2013.

=== Critical response ===
The film received mixed reviews. Some critics discussed its portrayal of Casablanca's underworld, social inequalities, and corruption, while others criticised its narrative and aesthetic choices. According to AlloCiné, the film received an average press rating of 3.1 out of 5, based on nine reviews.

The film sparked controversy over the dialogue used by its characters, which was characterised by shocking and offensive language reflecting everyday street speech. Some critics argued that the film pursued superficial sensationalism and sought to appeal to younger audiences at the expense of other aesthetic elements, prioritising audience appeal and commercial success. In contrast, director Nour-Eddine Lakhmari defended his artistic choices, citing his commitment to realism and his belief in the spontaneity of Moroccan Darija as spoken by urban youth. He described the film as a form of shock therapy, intended to encourage audiences to reflect on their circumstances and confront social problems and shortcomings candidly rather than ignore them.

=== Awards and accolades ===
- Grand Prize (Tangier National Film Festival)

== See also ==
- Casanegra
- Burnout
