= Abdelilah =

Abdelilah is a given name. Notable people with the name include:

- Abdelilah al-Khatib (born 1953), former Minister of Foreign Affairs for Jordan
- Abdelilah Abdul-Wahid (born 1956), former Iraq national football player
- Abdelilah Bagui (born 1978), former Moroccan footballer
- Abdelilah Basbousi, Moroccan actor
- Abdelilah Benkirane (born 1954), Prime Minister of Morocco from November 2011 to March 2017
- Abdelilah Fahmi (born 1973), Moroccan former football defender
- Abdelilah Galal (born 1986), Egyptian footballer
- Abdelilah Hafidi (born 1992), Moroccan professional footballer
- Abdelilah Hamdouchi (born 1958), Moroccan writer
- Abdelilah Haroun (1997–2021), Qatari track and field sprinter
- Abdelilah Mohammed Hassan (1934–2022), Iraq football coach, managed the Iraq national team
- Abdelilah Saber (born 1974), Moroccan retired footballer

== See also ==
- 'Abd al-Ilah
- Abdella (disambiguation)
- Abdul Ali
