= Strawberries (film) =

2026 film by Laïla Marrakchi

- Spanish: La más dulce
- Arabic: الفراولة
- Directed by: Laïla Marrakchi
- Written by: Laïla Marrakchi; Delphine Agut
- Produced by: Juliette Schrameck; Mathieu Verhaeghe; Thomas Verhaeghe
- Starring: Nisrin Erradi; Hind Braik; Fatima Attif; Larbi Mohammed; Itsaso Arana
- Cinematography: Tristan Galand
- Edited by: Jean-François Elie; Nicolas Chaudeurge
- Music by: Clara de Asís
- Production companies: Lumen; Mont Fleuri Production; Fasten Films; Mirage Films
- Distributed by: Bitters End
- Release date: 18 May 2026 (Cannes)
- Running time: 101 minutes
- Countries: France; Morocco; Spain; Belgium
- Languages: Arabic; Spanish

Strawberries (Spanish: La más dulce / الفراولة) is a 2026 drama film directed by Laïla Marrakchi, co-written with Delphine Agut. A co-production of France, Morocco, Spain, and Belgium, it stars Nisrin Erradi, Hind Braik, Fatima Attif, Hajar Graigaa, Larbi Mohammed, and Itsaso Arana.

The film had its world premiere in the Un Certain Regard section of the 2026 Cannes Film Festival on 18 May. It was also selected as the Moroccan submission for the Best International Feature Film at the 99th Academy Awards.

== Premise ==
The film follows a group of Moroccan women who travel to Andalusia, Spain, for seasonal strawberry-picking work, hoping to secure better opportunities for their families. Instead, they encounter harsh working conditions and abuse. As they form a close bond, they collaborate with a lawyer to pursue justice.

== Cast ==
- Nisrin Erradi
- Hind Braik
- Fatima Attif
- Hajar Graigaa
- Larbi Mohammed
- Itsaso Arana

== Production ==
=== Development ===
The project was first developed in the late 2010s and presented at the Atlas Workshops of the Marrakech International Film Festival in 2021. The screenplay was co-written by Laïla Marrakchi and Delphine Agut, and was inspired by real-life reports of abuse and exploitation of Moroccan agricultural workers in southern Spain. The film was conceived as a socially engaged drama addressing themes such as labor rights, gender-based violence, and migration. The project was selected again for the Atlas Workshops at the Marrakech International Film Festival, where it received the Work-in-Progress post-production award in 2025.

Strawberries is produced by Lumen (France), Mont Fleuri Production (Morocco), Fasten Films (Spain), and Mirage Films (Belgium). It's Marrakchi third feature film, following Marock (2005) and Rock the Casbah (2013).

== Release ==
In January 2026, Lucky Number acquired international sales rights and introduced the film to buyers at the European Film Market.

Strawberries had its world premiere at the Un Certain Regard section of the 2026 Cannes Film Festival on 18 May. It is one of three African films selected for the section in 2026.

== See also ==
- List of submissions to the 99th Academy Awards for Best International Feature Film
- List of Moroccan submissions for the Academy Award for Best International Feature Film
