= K1 (TV Series) =

- Genre: Crime, Drama
- Created by: Khadija Alami; Nour-Eddine Lakhmari
- Showrunners: Khadija Alami; Nour-Eddine Lakhmari
- Directed by: Nour-Eddine Lakhmari
- Starring: Rachid El Ouali; Fatima Zahra El Jaouhari; Imane Wassila; Youssef Arabi
- Country of origin: Morocco
- Original languages: Darija; French
- No. of seasons: 1
- No. of episodes: 8

Production
- Running time: 52 minutes
- Production company: K Films

Original release
- Network: 2M
- Release: March 31, 2026

K1 (also known as K1 - قانون و نظام) is a Moroccan crime drama television series, broadcast on 2M since 31 March 2026. It focuses on a specialised unit of the Moroccan judicial police pursuing organised crime across the country.

== Synopsis ==
The series follows an elite police unit travelling across Morocco to pursue organised crime while confronting personal struggles that shape them into deeply human and empathetic characters.

== Cast ==
=== Main ===
- Rachid El Ouali as Aziz
- Fatima Zahra El Jaouhari as Nadia
- Imane Wassila
- Youssef Arabi
- Abderrahmane Oukkour
- Hajar El Hamidi
- Hafsa Tayeb
- Nadia Kazar
- Sahar Nejmi

=== Guest ===
- Karim Doukali
- Marie Batoul Prenant
- Mohamed Zakaria El Hattab
- Ayoub Trombati
- Alexandra Modena
- Sofia Samani
- Saad Oulidi Jawhari
- Oumaima Lebbar Andaloussi
- Mustapha Atougui
- Younes Badaoui
- Faical Attougui
- Hind El Kilani

== Production ==
K1 was created by Khadija Alami and Nour-Eddine Lakhmari, both also serving as showrunners. The series was produced by K Films with the collaboration of the Direction Générale de la Sûreté Nationale (DGSN), which provided technical guidance, training, and access to police infrastructure to ensure realism.

Filming took place across multiple Moroccan locations, including Casablanca, Merzouga, Tétouan, and Ifrane.

With a reported budget of approximately 1.5 million Moroccan dirhams per episode, K1 is considered one of the most expensive television productions in Moroccan history.

== Release ==
The series premiered on 31 March 2026 and is broadcast weekly on Tuesdays. It is available in Moroccan Arabic (Darija), with a French-dubbed version also produced for wider audiences, including the Moroccan diaspora.

== Reception ==
K1 generated significant attention on social media and was described as an ambitious step forward for Moroccan television production, praised for its realism, cinematic style, and focus on character depth.
