= Noureddine Bikr =

Moroccan actor and comedian (1952–2022)

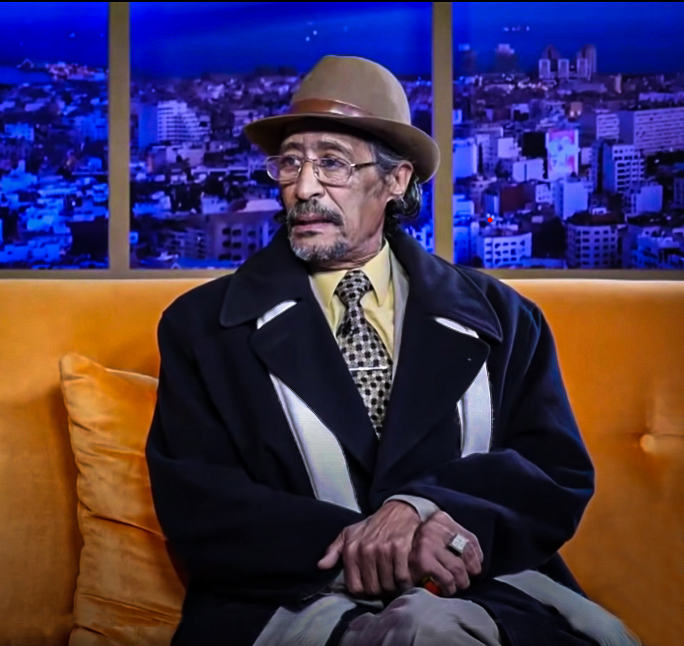
- Born: 11 February 1952; Casablanca
- Died: 2 September 2022 (aged 70); Casablanca
- Occupation: Actor

Noureddine Bikr (Arabic: نور الدين بكر) (11 February 1952 – 2 September 2022) was a Moroccan actor and comedian.

== Biography ==
Bikr was born on 11 February 1952 in the Derb Sultan neighborhood in Casablanca. He joined the Al Oukhouwa Al Arabiya troupe in 1967 when he was 14 years old, which was led by Abdeladim Chennaoui. His beginnings were with the Tayeb Saddiki school, where Tayeb taught. He made his debut as a comedian with the company Masrah al hay in the 1990s. The play Charrah Mallah was one of his best theatrical productions. He also took part in many soap operas and sitcoms, including Serb al Hamam with actor-director Rachid El Ouali in 1998. Bikr was known for several works shared between cinema, theater, and television, including the film Zeft (Asphalt) (1984) directed by Tayeb Saddiki, La Garde du corps (1984) by François Leterrier, and Les griffes du passé (2015) by Abdelkrim Derkaoui.

In 2020 many newsagents claimed that Bikr died after suffering from Throat Cancer since 2019, but the claims were unfounded. Before his death, he last worked in the 2021 sitcom Zawajtoka Nafis in a role with no dialogue. Bikr died on 2 September 2022.

=== Plays ===
Plays
Year	Title
2008	Al-Sei Al-arab
2000	Love and Hay
1996	Sensory Sensory
1994	Mind and Blackboard
1994	Going Crazy
1993	new director
1991	Kari hanko
1990	Charrah Mallah

=== Films ===
Films
Year	Title	Notes
2021	Zawajtoka Nafsi	Series
2020	Congé	Film
2019	Braquage à La Marocaine	Film
2018	Stagiaire	Film
2016	Spider's Web	Film
2016	Aami	Film
2016	Cairo-blanca	Series
2015	Al Farouj	Film
2015	Gharam Wa Enntiqam	Film
2015	Maqtoo' Men Shajara	Series
2012	Monster Dance	Film
2011	Jnah L'hwa	Film
2001	Al Hariban	Series
1999	Al Mousaboun	Series
1998	Al Sarab	Series
1998	Serb El Hamam	Series
1986	Eabaas aw juha lam yamut	Film
