= Nouhaila Arif =

Moroccan actress

- Occupation: actress
- Known for: Casablanca Beats

Nouhaila Arif is a Moroccan actress. She is best known for her role in Nabil Ayouch's 2021 film Casablanca Beats (French: Haut et Fort), which was selected to compete for the Palme d'Or at the 2021 Cannes Film Festival.
