= Loubna Abidar =

Moroccan actress

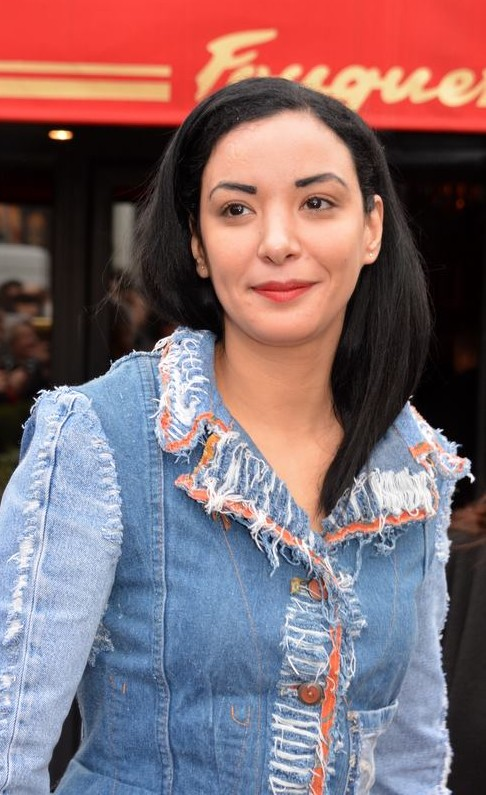
- Loubna Abidar in 2016
- Born: 20 September 1985 (age 41); Marrakesh, Morocco
- Occupation: Actress
- Years active: 2012–present
- Awards: Gijón International Film Festival

Loubna Abidar (born 20 September 1985) is a Moroccan actress.

== Career ==
Abidar was born in Marrakesh to a Berber father and an Arab mother. She made her film debut in Much Loved, which was directed by Nabil Ayouch. The film was banned in 2015 by Morocco's Ministry of Communication for "serious outrage" to "moral values". She was awarded the best actress at the 2015 Gijón International Film Festival

In November 2015, Abidar was violently attacked in Casablanca and left the country for France soon after. In January 2016, she received a nomination for the César Award for Best Actress for her role in the film.

== Filmography ==
Year	Title	Role	Notes
2011	Ben X		Film Debut
2013	I'm a Nurse not a Prostitute	The Nurse	Short Film
2015	Much Loved	Noha	Nominated - César Award for Best Actress Gijón International Film Festival - Best Actress Festival International du Film Francophone de Namur - Bayard d'or Best Actress Angoulême Francophone Film Festival - Valois Best Actress
2015	The Transporters	Souad	
2016	Le Coq	Fatima	
2017	Happy End	Claire	
2018	Amin	the first waitress	
2018	Sextape	the mother	
2018	Proud	Farah	TV miniseries
2019	An Easy Girl	Dounia	
2019	Mythomaniac	Karima	TV miniseries
2019	Mauvais oeil	Salima	Short Film
2022	Sons of Ramses	The mother of Frikket and Farel	
2024	Le Centre du Monde	Exiled Woman	Short Film
2023	Sugar and Stars	Samia	
2025	Nismet	Najwa	TV Miniseries
2025	Demons to Diamonds	Solange	Short Film
2025	Autisto	Malika	
