= Jordis =

Jordis may refer to:

== First name ==
- Jördis Steinegger (born 1983), Austrian swimmer
- Jördis Triebel (born 1977), German film and stage actress
- Jordis Unga (born 1982), American rock singer

== Surname ==
- Christine Jordis (born 1942), French writer, journalist, and editor
