= Lune Rouge =

Lune Rouge may refer to:

- La lune rouge, 2013 Moroccan drama film directed by Hassan Benjelloun
- Lune Rouge (album) by Tokimonsta, 2017
- Lune Rouge for piano, Op. 13, by Alissa Firsova
