= Sex tape (disambiguation) =

Sex tape is a video recording of a sex act, usually referring to a type of amateur pornography

Sex tape or Sex Tape may also refer to:

== Film ==
- Sex Tape (film), 2014 American comedy film
- Sextape (2018 film), 2018 French film
- Sx Tape, 2013 found footage horror film

== Music ==
- The S(ex) Tapes, 2020 EP by Fletcher
- "Sextape", a song by Deftones from their album Diamond Eyes
