= Morjana Alaoui =

Moroccan actress (born 1982)

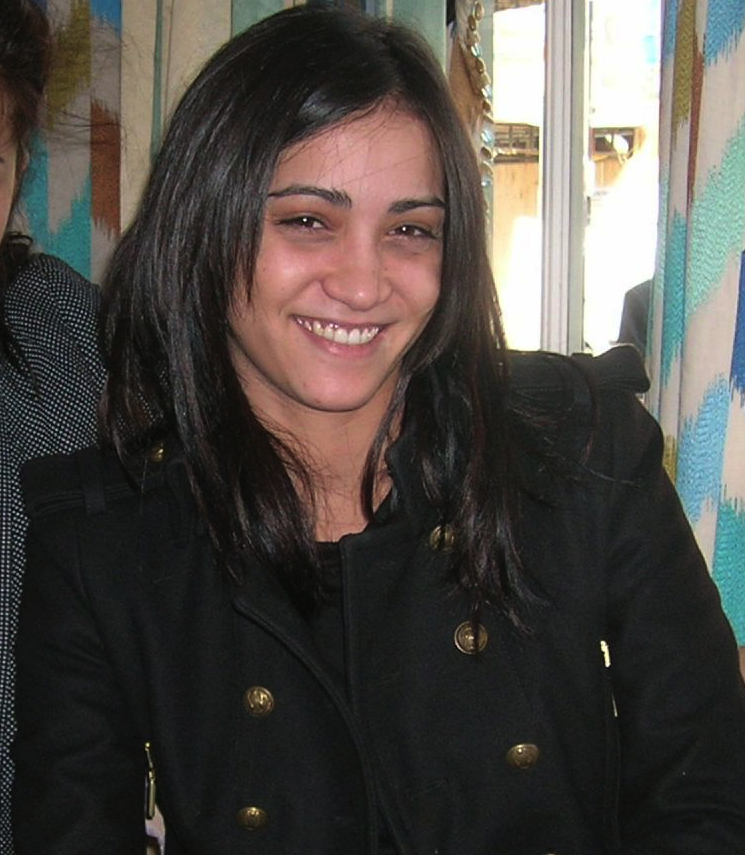
- Alaoui in 2009
- Born: November 30, 1982 (age 43); Casablanca, Morocco
- Education: American University
- Occupation: Actress

Morjana Alaoui (Arabic: مرجانة العلوي; born November 30, 1982) is a Moroccan actress. She is best known for her starring roles in director Laila Marrakchi's Marock (2005) and Rock the Casbah (2013). She also starred in Pascal Laugier's horror film Martyrs (2008).

== Biography ==
Alaoui spent her early life in the Anfa neighborhood of Casablanca, Morocco, and studied at the Casablanca American School. At 18, Alaoui moved to Paris, France, where she studied at the American University of Paris. While attending the university, she met director Laila Marrakchi, who offered her a role in the film Marock (2005). Marock was critically acclaimed and provided Alaoui national fame. In 2007, she began filming Martyrs, for which she is also known. In 2016, Alaoui starred in psychological thriller Broken directed by Shaun Robert Smith.

== Filmography ==
Year	Title	Role	Notes
2004	Haters	Elise Collier	
2005	Marock	Rita	
2008	Martyrs	Anna	
2009	The Two Lives of Daniel Shore	Imane	
2010	Le Rodba	Nina	Short film
2010	Golakani Kirkuk	Najla	
2011	Special Forces	Maina	
2013	Rock the Casbah	Sofia	
2013	Traitors	Jad	
2014	The Hybrid	Lyla Healy	
2014	The Red Tent	Ahouri	Miniseries
2016	Broken (aka The Myth of Hopelessness)	Evie	
2017	Burnout	Ines	
