= Abdelilah Basbousi =

Moroccan actor

- Citizenship: Morocco
- Occupation: Actor
- Known for: his role in Nabil Ayouch's 2021

Abdelilah Basbousi is a Moroccan actor. He is best known for his role in Nabil Ayouch's 2021 film Casablanca Beats (French: Haut et Fort), which was selected to compete for the Palme d'Or at the 2021 Cannes Film Festival. He is the brother of Anas Basbousi, the well known actor in the artistic name of Bawss.
