= Maryam Touzani =

Moroccan filmmaker and actress

Maryam Touzani مريم التوزاني
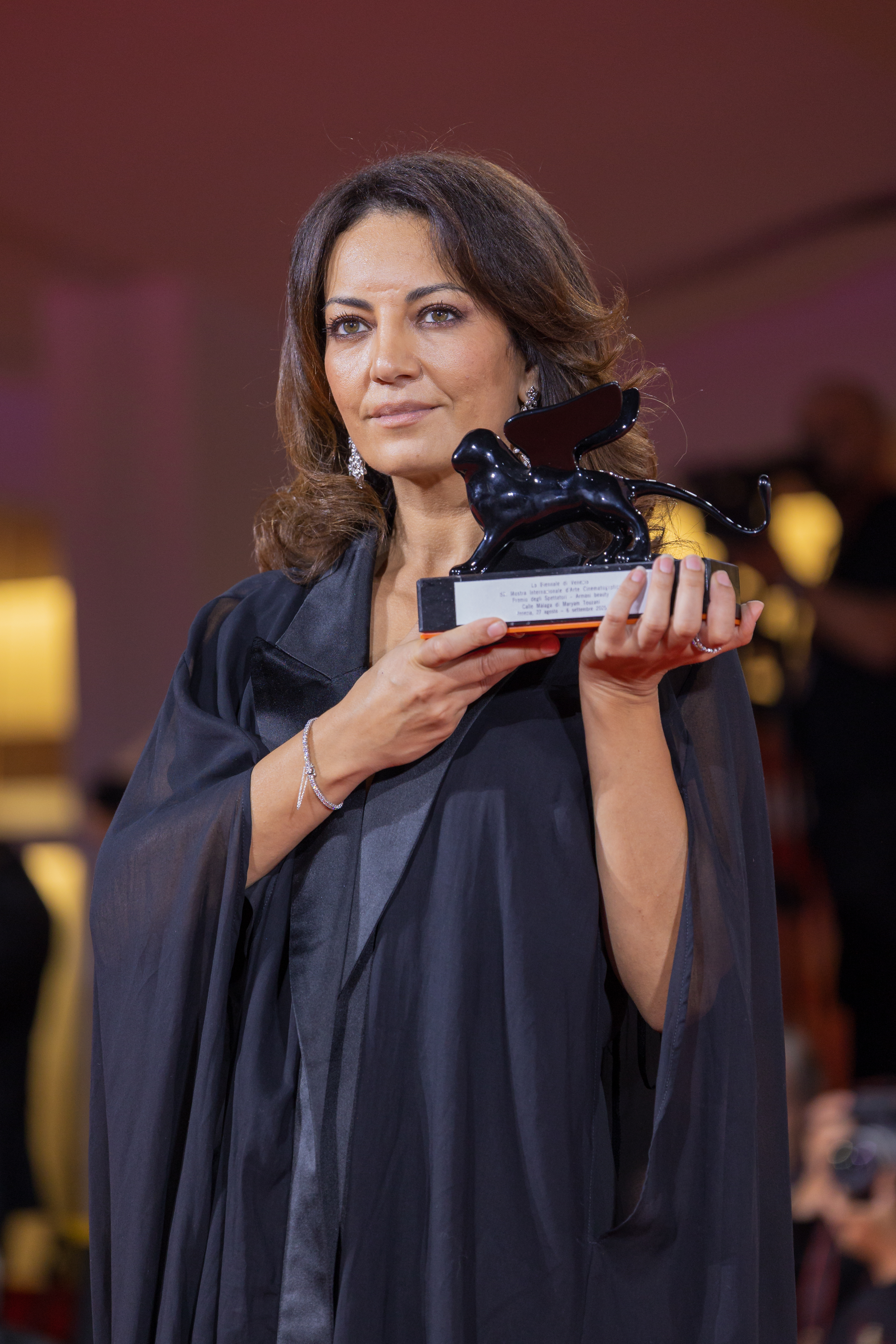
- Touzani in Venice 2025
- Born: Maryam Touzani; 17 September 1980 (age 46); Tangier, Morocco
- Occupations: Director, actress, screenwriter
- Years active: 1991–present
- Spouse: Nabil Ayouch

Maryam Touzani (born 17 September 1980) is a Moroccan filmmaker and actress. She is best known as the director of the critically acclaimed film Adam (2019), Morocco's entry for the 92nd Academy Awards for Best International Feature Film, and The Blue Caftan (2022), the country's submission for the same award for the 95th Academy Awards.

== Early life ==
Touzani was born in 1980 in Tangier. In 2003, she obtained a master's degree in media communication and journalism in London. She began her career as a journalist with a focus on cinema.

== Career ==
At first, Touzani worked as a screenwriter while directing short and documentary films. In 2011, she made the short Quand ils dorment. It won 17 prizes, including that of the Special Jury at the Huesca International Film Festival, the festival qualifying for the Oscars.

In 2014, she made her debut documentary Sous Ma Peau Vieille. The film, which discussed prostitution in Morocco, became very popular in that country. Following its success, Touzani adapted it as a feature drama film, titled Much Loved (2015). She wrote the sceenplay and her husband Nabil Ayouch directed.

In late 2015, Touzani made her second short Aya va à la plage. The film revolves around the exploitation of minor children as domestic workers.

In 2017, Touzani wrote the film Razzia with her husband. She also played the lead role of Salima in the film.

In 2019, Touzani directed her first feature film, Adam. The film was selected for the Cannes Film Festival in the section 'Un Certain Regard', and later at the 12th Festival International du Film Francophone de Namur of Angoulême. It was selected as the Moroccan entry for the Best International Feature Film at the 92nd Academy Awards, but it was not nominated.

In the same year, Touzani became a member of the Academy of Oscars.

In 2022, Touzani's film The Blue Caftan was awarded the Un Certain Regard FIPRESCI Prize at the 2022 Cannes Film Festival.

== Favorite films ==
In 2022, Touzani participated in the Sight & Sound film polls of that year. It is held every ten years to select the greatest films of all time, by asking contemporary directors to select ten films of their choice. Touzani's selections were:

- Tokyo Story (1953)
- Bicycle Thieves (1948)
- Una giornata particolare (1977)
- Ali Zaoua (2000)
- Persona (1966)
- The Kid (1921)
- In the Mood for Love (2000)
- La Règle du jeu (1939)
- Mirror (1975)
- Modern Times (1936)

== Personal life ==
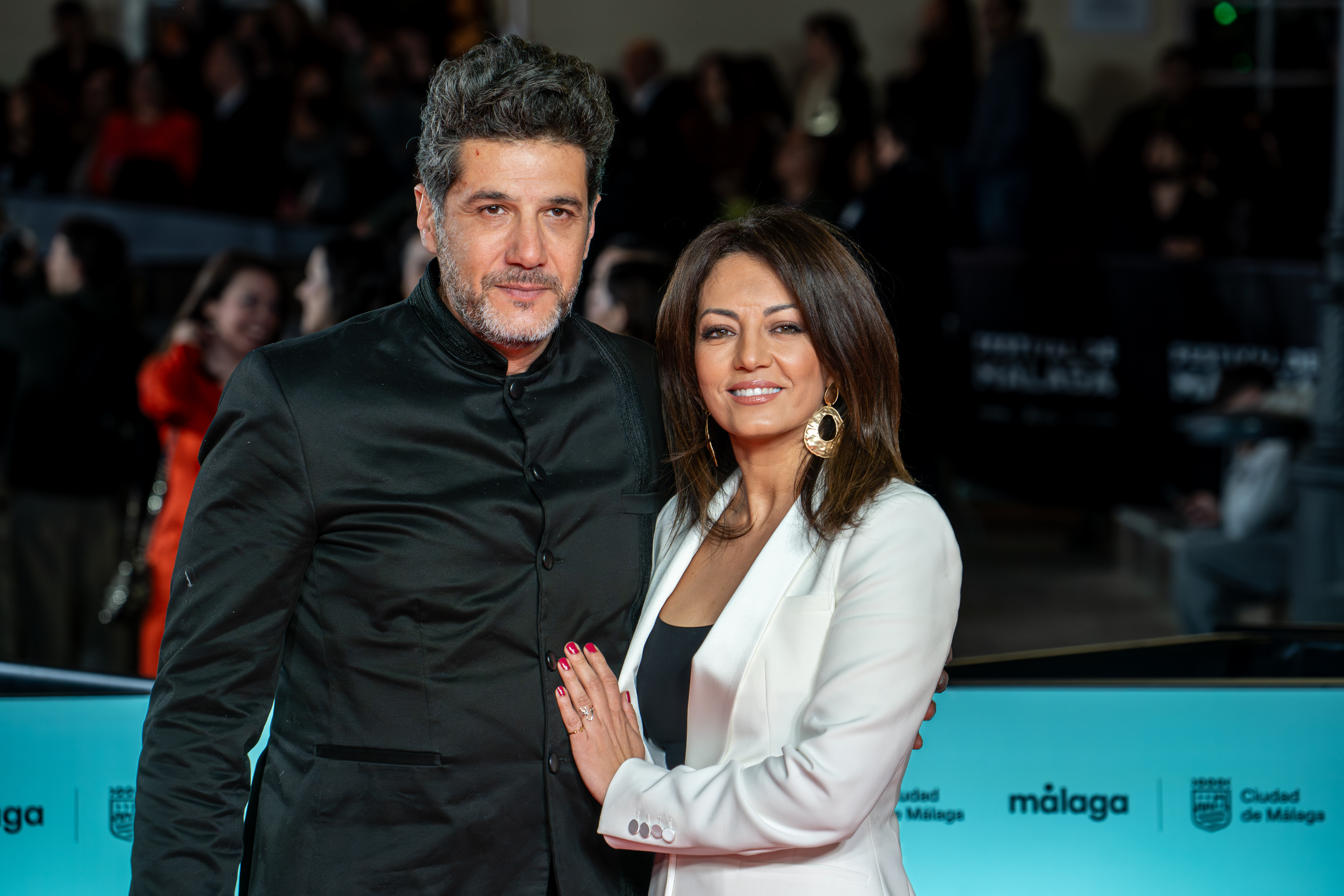
Touzani and Ayouch attending the 29th Málaga Film Festival.

Touzani is married to fellow Moroccan filmmaker Nabil Ayouch.

== Filmography ==
=== As filmmaker ===
Year	Film	Notes
2014	Sous ma peau vieille	Documentary
2019	Adam	
2022	The Blue Caftan	
2025	Calle Malaga	

=== Only screenwriter ===
Year	Film	Notes
2017	Razzia	Also Actress
2022	Casablanca Beats	
2024	Everybody Loves Touda	

=== Short films ===
Year	Film	Role	Ref.
2012	Quand ils dorment	Director, writer	
2015	Aya va à la plage	Director	
