= Des murs et des hommes =

- Directed by: Dalila Ennadre
- Written by: Dalila Ennadre
- Produced by: Philippe Romeo, Raffaele Ventura
- Cinematography: Dalila Ennadre
- Edited by: Véronique Lagoarde-Ségot
- Music by: Hisham Hattab
- Production companies: Label Vidéo, Djinn Productions, Dubai Entertainment and Media Organization, France Télévisions, Télé Bocal
- Release date: 2013
- Running time: 83 minutes
- Countries: Morocco, UAE, Algeria, France, Qatar

Des murs et des hommes (English: Walls and People) is a 2013 documentary film directed by Dalila Ennadre.

== Synopsis ==
A voice embodying Casablanca's old medina recounts the stories of the inhabitants who live inside its walls.

== Festivals, awards and accolades ==
- 2014 : Panorama des Cinémas du Maghreb et du Moyen-Orient (PCMMO)
- 2014 : Dubai International Film Festival (DIFF)
- 2014: 6th International Festival of Documentary Film (FIDADOC) (awarded Grand TV 2M Prize)
