= Mektoub =

1997 film

- Directed by: Nabil Ayouch
- Written by: Nabil Ayouch
- Produced by: Étienne Comar
- Starring: Rachid El Ouali
- Release date: December 1997 (Egypt)
- Running time: 90 minutes
- Countries: France; Morocco
- Language: Arabic

Mektoub is a 1997 French-Moroccan drama film directed by Nabil Ayouch. The film was selected as the Moroccan entry for the Best Foreign Language Film at the 71st Academy Awards, but was not accepted as a nominee.

== Cast ==
- Rachid El Ouali as Dr. Taoufik Raoui
- Faouzi Bensaïdi as Kamel Raoui
- Amal Chabli as Sophia Raoui
- Mohammed Miftah as Inspector Kabir
- Malika Oufkir as The Village Chief

== See also ==
- List of submissions to the 71st Academy Awards for Best Foreign Language Film
- List of Moroccan submissions for the Academy Award for Best Foreign Language Film
