= Une minute de soleil en moins =

- Film poster
- Directed by: Nabil Ayouch
- Written by: Nabil Ayouch; Malika Al Houbach
- Produced by: Béatrice Caufmann
- Starring: Lubna Azabal; Mohamed Majd; Noureddin Orahhou; Hicham Moussoune; Noor
- Cinematography: Joël David
- Edited by: Vanessa Zambernardi
- Production companies: Arte; BC Films; GMT Productions
- Release date: 15 April 2003
- Countries: France; Morocco
- Language: French

Une minute de soleil en moins (transl. A Minute of Sun Less) is a drama film directed by French-Moroccan director Nabil Ayouch and broadcast in 2003. Commissioned by the cultural channel Arte, it is part of the "Masculin/Féminin" collection of films by ten directors.

== Synopsis ==
Kamel Raoui, a young police inspector, is assigned to investigate the murder of Hakim Tahiri, a major drug trafficker. The first suspect is his employee and mistress: Touria, a young woman who lives at the scene of the crime with her younger brother, Pipo. While Touria is placed in custody, Kamel takes Pipo into his home and bonds with the child.
