= Dalila Ennadre =

Moroccan film director (1966–2020)

- Born: 12 August 1966; Casablanca, Morocco
- Died: 14 May 2020 (aged 53); Paris, France
- Occupation: Film Director
- Notable work: El Batalett, Femmes de la médina

Dalila Ennadre (12 August 1966 – 14 May 2020) was a Moroccan film director.

== Biography ==
Ennadre was born in Casablanca and grew up in France. She lived in Saint-Denis and La Courneuve. Her older brother, Touhami, was passionate about photography and became an artist-photographer. She left school at age 16 and stayed in Guyana, Germany, Morocco, and Quebec. During this time, she studied cinema and worked as a production manager on several TV series and commissioned films for institutions.

Ennadre devoted herself to making documentary films, often revolving around daily life in Morocco. She directed her first film in 1987, titled Par la grâce d'Allah. She worked on numerous films as a production manager, returning to directing in 1999 with Loups du désert. She then directed El Batalett, Femmes de la médina, a documentary on women living in the medina of Casablanca.

Ennadre appeared in a Brahim Fritah film in 2012, titled Chroniques d’une cour de récré. She then returned to the medina of Casablanca to film Des murs et des hommes.

Dalila Ennadre died in Paris on 14 May 2020 at the age of 53 following a long illness.

== Filmography ==
=== Director ===
- Par la grâce d’Allah (1987)
- Idoles dans l’ombre (1994)
- Loups du désert (1999)
- El Batalett, Femmes de la médina (2001)
- La caravane de Mé Aïcha (2003)
- Fama, une héroïne sans gloire (2004)
- Je voudrais vous raconter (2005)
- J'ai tant aimé... (2008)
- Des murs et des hommes (2014)
- Jean Genet, notre père des fleurs (2019)

=== Actress ===
- Chroniques d'une cour de récré (2012)
