= Prix du roman arabe =

The Prix du roman arabe of the "Council of Arab Ambassadors" is a French literary award established in 2008.

Its aim is to "reward a work of high literary value as well as consolidate the intercultural dialogue between the Arab world and France by putting forward Arabic literature translated or written directly in French." Placed under the aegis of the Council of Arab Ambassadors in France in partnership with the Institut du monde arabe, it is endowed with a sum of 15000 euros.

In June 2012, Boualem Sansal received this award for his book Rue Darwin against the opposition of the Arab ambassadors who finance it due to Sansal's visit to Israel to speak at the Jerusalem Writers Festival. This disavowal resulted in the resignation of the jury member Olivier Poivre d'Arvor

== Jury ==
The award was launched with the following members of the jury:

- Hélène Carrère d'Encausse of the Académie française, honorary president
- Dominique Baudis, then director of the Institut du monde arabe
- Hélé Béji
- Tahar Ben Jelloun
- Pierre Brunel
- Paule Constant
- Paula Jacques
- Christine Jordis
- Vénus Khoury-Ghata
- Alexandre Najjar
- Olivier Poivre d'Arvor
- Danièle Sallenave
- Elias Sanbar

== Laureates ==
- 2008: Elias Khoury for Comme si elle dormait, translated by Rania Samara, Actes Sud
- 2009: Gamal Ghitany for Les Poussières de l'effacement, translated by Khaled Osman, Éditions du Seuil
- 2010: Rachid Boudjedra for Les Figuiers de Barbarie, éd. Grasset and Mahi Binebine for Les Étoiles de Sidi Moumen, Flammarion
- 2011: Hanan al-Shaykh for Toute une histoire, translated by Stéphanie Dujols, Actes Sud.
- 2012: Boualem Sansal for Rue Darwin, Éditions Gallimard
