= Anas Basbousi =

Moroccan actor and rapper

- Born: November 20, 1990 (age 35)
- Other name: Bawss
- Citizenship: Morocco
- Occupations: Actor; rapper; singer
- Known for: Casablanca Beats

Anas Basbousi (Arabic: أنس بسبوسي; born November 28, 1990) known artistically as Bawss, is a Moroccan actor and rapper. He is best known for his role in Nabil Ayouch's 2021 film Casablanca Beats (French: Haut et Fort), which was selected to compete for the Palme d'Or at the 2021 Cannes Film Festival.
