= Mahi Binebine =

Moroccan painter and novelist

- ماحي بنيبين
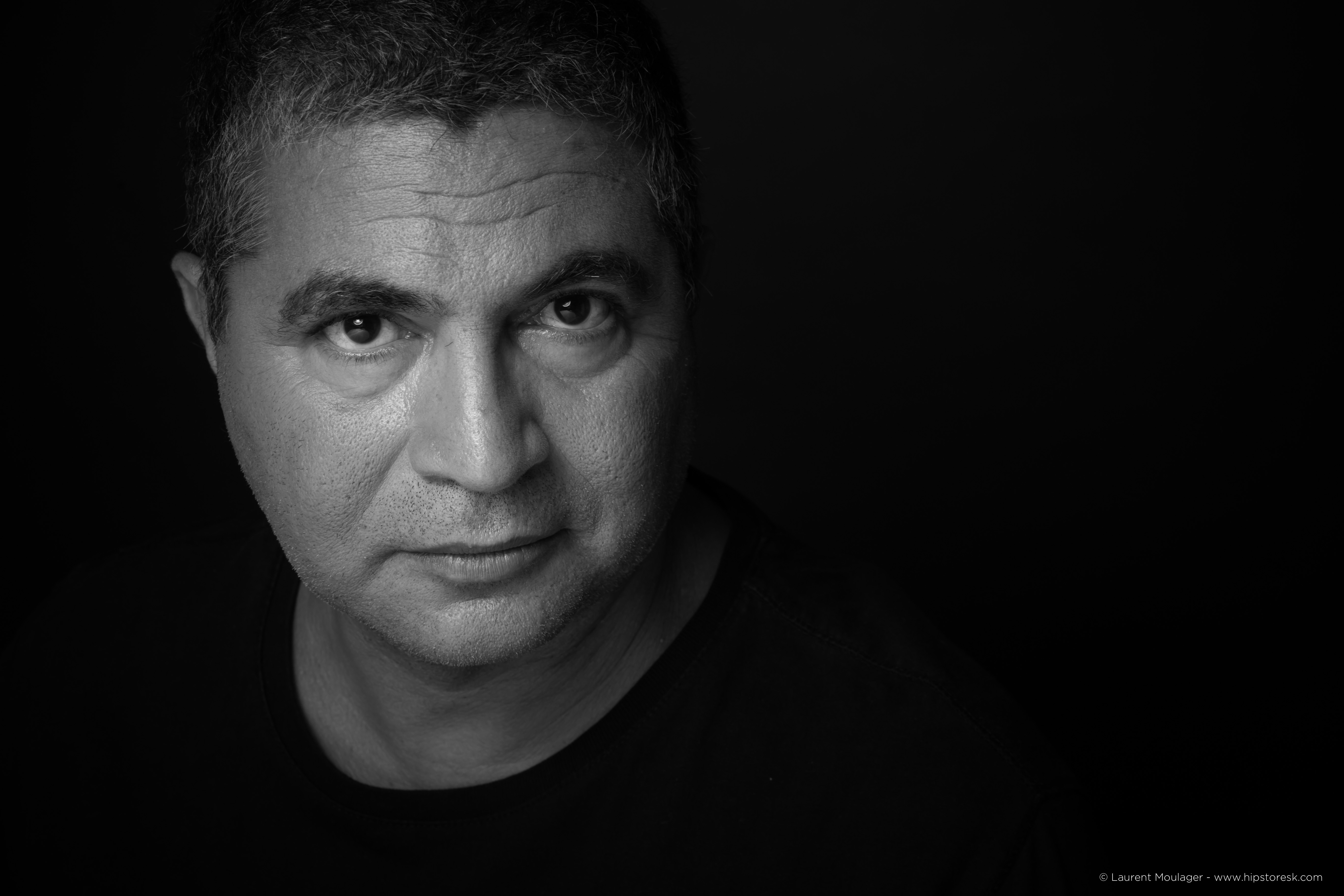
- Binebine in 2017
- Born: 1959 (age 66–67); Marrakesh, Morocco
- Known for: Writing, painting

Mahi Binebine (Arabic: ماحي بنيبين; born 1959) is a Moroccan painter and novelist. Binebine has written twelve novels which have been translated into various languages.

== Career ==
Born in 1959 in Marrakesh, Mahi Binebine moved to Paris in 1980 to continue his studies in mathematics, which he taught for eight years. He then devoted himself to writing and painting. He wrote several novels, which have been translated into a dozen languages. He emigrated to New York from 1994 to 1999. His paintings are part of the permanent collection at the Guggenheim Museum in New York. He returned to Marrakesh in 2002 where he currently lives and works.

In "Mamaya’s Last Journey" the author is drawing on an episode from his family history. His brother Aziz was one of the young officers who had taken part in the failed military coup against King Hassan II in 1971. For 18 years, he was imprisoned in the desert camp of Tazmamart, under conditions of unimaginable and almost indescribable brutality. Of the 56 prisoners, only half survived; among them, Aziz Binebine. Mahi Binebine's fellow writer Tahar Ben Jelloun took this story as the basis for his novel This Blinding Absence of Light.

Welcome to Paradise, the English translation of Cannibales (by Lulu Norman) was short-listed for the Independent Foreign Fiction Prize in 2004. Horses of God, also translated by Lulu Norman (original: Les étoiles de Sidi Moumen), was shortlisted for the Best Translated Book Award in 2014. It was made into a feature film in Morocco in 2011, called Horses of God, directed by Nabil Ayouch and selected for the official Moroccan entry for best foreign language film for the 2013 Oscars.

In 2020, Mahi won the Mediterranean Prize for his novel "Rue du pardon".

== Novels ==
- Le sommeil de l'esclave, Ed. Stock 1992, ISBN 2234024889
- Les funérailles du lait, Ed. Stock 1994, ISBN 9954167412
- L'ombre du poète, Ed. Stock 1997, ISBN 2234046688
- Pollens, Ed. Fayard 2001, ISBN 2213609969
- Terre d'ombres brulée, 1997 Ed. Fayard, ISBN 2213617627
- Cannibales, Ed. Fayard 1999, Ed. L'Aube, ISBN 2213604444 (English translation Welcome to Paradise)
- Le griot de Marrakech, 2005 Ed. L'Aube, ISBN 275260212X
- Les étoiles de Sidi Moumen, Ed. Flammarion 2010 ISBN 2081236362 (English translation "Horses of God"), French Prix du roman arabe; Movie by Nabil Ayouch, Les chevaux de Dieu, English translation Horses of God
- Le Seigneur vous le rendra, Ed. Flammarion 2013, ISBN 2213670846
- Le fou du Roi, Ed. Stock 2017, ISBN 223408265X

== Exhibitions ==
- 2017 Galerie Abla Ababou, Rabat
- 2017 Art Paris (Grand Palais)
- 2017 Galerie DX
- 2017 Rétrospective – Galerie Claude Lemand
- 2016 Musée MACMA, Marrakesh
- 2015 Insoumission
- 2015 Forum international des droits de L'Homme
- 2015 Musée de la Palmeraie, Marrakesh
- 2014 Musée de la Palmeraie, Marrakesh
- 2013 Galerie Document 15, Paris
- 2012 Galerie 38, Casablanca
- 2012 Galerie Benamou, Paris
- 2011 Galerie Caprice Horn, Berlin
- 2011 Galerie Loft (Expo à six mains avec Mourabiti et Yamou), Casablanca
- 2010 Galerie Atelier 21 (Casablanca)
- 2010 AAART Foundation, Kitzbühel, Austria
- 2009 53ème Biennale de Venise Venice Biennale
- 2009 AAART Foundation - Autriche
- 2009 Galerie CMOOA, Rabat
- 2009 Galerie Delacroix, Tanger
- 2008 Galerie Atelier 21 - Casablanca
- 2008 Galerie Violon Bleu - Londres
- 2008 Galerie Navarra - 75 Faubourg, Paris
- 2008 Galerie Loft, Paris
- 2008 Galerie Bailly, Paris
- 2008 Foundation FAAP, São Paulo
- 2007 Siège Société Générale Morocco, Casablanca
- 2007 Galerie Nationale Bab Rouah, Rabat
- 2007 Galerie Noir sur blanc, Marrakesh
- 2007 Palais des Congrès, Grasse (France)
- 2007 Le Lazaret Olandini, Ajaccio (Avec Yamou)
- 2006 Kasbah Agafay, Marrakesh
- 2006 Galerie Venise Cadre, Casablanca
- 2006 Galerie les Atlassides, Marrakesh
- 2005 Galerie Venise-Cadre, Casablanca
- 2005 Galerie Atlassides, Marrakesh
- 2005 Musée Archéologique de Silves (Portugal)
- 2005 Eglise de la Miséricorde, Silves (Portugal)
- 2005 Gemap, Casablanca
- 2004 Arte Invest, Rome
- 2004 Festival Arte Mare Bastia (corse)
- 2004 Bellas Artes, Madrid
- 2004 Galerie Atalante, Madrid
- 2004 Galerie Brigitte Schenk, Cologne
- 2003 Espace Actua, Casablanca (avec Yamou)
- 2003 Galerie Bab el kebir, Rabat (avec Selfati)
- 2003 Galerie AAM, Rome
- 2003 Studio Bocchi, Rome
- 2003 Fundacione Maturen, Tarazona.
- 2003 Galerie Baskoa, Barcelonne.
- 2003 Kunst Köln, Galerie Brigitte Schenk
- 2002 Galerie Dahiez & Associés, Zurich
- 2002 Galerie Brigitte Schenk, Cologne
- 2002 Musée de Marrakech
- 2002 Société Générale Marocaine, Casablanca
- 2002 Institut Cervantes, Tanger
- 2002 Galerie Brigitte Schenk, Kunst Köln
- 2002 Ministère de la culture, Abu Dhabi
- 2001 Tinglado 4 Moll de Costa, Taragone
- 2001 Palais des congrès, Grasse.
- 2000 Espace Paul Ricard, Paris
- 2000 Galerie El Manar, Casablanca
- 1999 Galerie Stendhal, New York
- 1999 Galerie du Fleuve, Paris
- 1999 Galerie Brigitte Shenk, Cologne
- 1998 Galerie Ott, Düsseldorf
- 1998 Museum of Contemporary Art, Washington, D.C.
- 1997 Galerie Stendhal, New York.
- 1989 Contemporary French Art Gallery, New York
- 1988 Galerie la Découverte, Rabat
- 1987 Galerie de L'ONMT, Paris
