= Les Pierres bleues du désert =

- Directed by: Nabil Ayouch
- Written by: Nabil Ayouch
- Starring: Jamal Debbouz, Naïma Lemcharqui, Souad Saber
- Cinematography: Vincent Jeannot
- Edited by: Albert Coporossi
- Distributed by: Arte
- Release date: 1992

Les Pierres bleues du désert (English: The Blue Stones of the Desert) is a short film written and directed by French-Moroccan Nabil Ayouch in 1992. It was shot in the Moroccan region of Tafraout and featured a then unknown teenage Jamel Debbouze.

== Synopsis ==
In a remote village in Morocco. Najib, 14 years old, is convinced that there are blue stones in the desert, whose vision has haunted him for years. Taken for a madman by his friends, he also faces the incomprehension of his family. Only the old sheikh believes in his story. One day, the council meets to decide on his case.
