= The Unknown Saint =

2019 film

- Theatrical release poster
- Directed by: Alaa Eddine Aljem
- Written by: Alaa Eddine Aljem
- Starring: Younes Bouab
- Cinematography: Amine Berrada
- Edited by: Lilian Corbeille
- Release date: 15 May 2019 (Cannes)
- Running time: 100 minutes
- Countries: Morocco; France; Qatar
- Language: Moroccan Arabic

The Unknown Saint is a 2019 internationally co-produced comedy-drama film directed by Alaa Eddine Aljem. It was selected as the Moroccan entry for the Best International Feature Film at the 93rd Academy Awards, but it was not nominated.

== Synopsis ==
A thief driving a car is chased by the police through the Moroccan desert, where he hastily hides his bag of money at the top of a hill just before being arrested.

Released after years in prison, he returns there with his accomplices. But a “Mausoleum of the Unknown Saint” has been built on the summit of the hill that conceals his buried treasure. By day, the mausoleum has become a healing place of worship for the nearby villagers, and at night a guard watches over it with his dog to prevent it from being looted. The thief and his main accomplice settle in the village in order to recover their hidden loot.

A series of unforeseen events prevents them from succeeding. After the prayers of a group of villagers, rain finally falls. And once the thieves ultimately blow up the mausoleum, “The Miracle of the Unknown Saint” occurs, bringing joy and prosperity to the village, isolated amid dust and rocks.

== Cast ==
- Younes Bouab as The thief
- Salah Bensalah as The Brain
- Bouchaib Semmak as Hassan
- Hassan Ben Badida as The Nurse
- Mohammed Nouaimane as Brahim
- Anas El Baz as The doctor

== See also ==
- List of submissions to the 93rd Academy Awards for Best International Feature Film
- List of Moroccan submissions for the Academy Award for Best International Feature Film
