= Je voudrais vous raconter =

- Directed by: Dalila Ennadre
- Written by: Dalila Ennadre
- Cinematography: Dalila Ennadre
- Edited by: Christine Carrière; Dalila Ennadre
- Production companies: 2M TV Maroc; Play Film; NMO (Nederland Moslim Omroep); Images Plus
- Distributed by: Laya Prod; La Maison du doc
- Release date: 2005
- Running time: 60 minutes
- Countries: Morocco; France
- Language: Moroccan Arabic

Je voudrais vous raconter (English: I Wanted To Tell You) is a French-Moroccan documentary film directed by Dalila Ennadre, released in 2005.

== Synopsis ==
The film tells the intertwined stories of Moroccan women of all walks of life after the passing of the Mudawana.

== Awards and accolades ==
- 2007 : Tarifa Festival of African Cinema - Jury Prize
