= El Batalett, Femmes de la médina =

- Directed by: Dalila Ennadre
- Written by: Dalila Ennadre
- Produced by: Samir Abdallah
- Cinematography: Dalila Ennadre
- Edited by: Barbara Pueyo
- Production companies: Canal+ Horizons, ARTE France, L' Yeux ouverts, Les Films de la Passerelle, Images Plus, RTBF - Radio Télévision Belge Francophone, RTBF - Radio Télévision Belge Francophone
- Distributed by: L' Yeux ouverts
- Release date: 2000
- Running time: 60 minutes
- Countries: Morocco, France, Belgium
- Language: Moroccan Arabic

El Batalett, Femmes de la médina (English: The Heroines, Women of the Medina) is a 2000 documentary film directed by Dalila Ennadre. The film has been screened by a number of international film festivals.

== Synopsis ==
The film is set in the heart of the old medina of Casablanca. It follows a group of women who have lived there since their childhood. Together, between laughter and tears, they paint a complex image of the popular Moroccan woman, far from clichés, punctuated by their struggles and by major events such as the death of King Hassan II and the march of women for their rights in March 2000.
