= Road to Kabul =

- Directed by: Brahim Chkiri
- Release date: 16 January 2012 (Tangier Film Festival)
- Running time: 112 minutes
- Country: Morocco
- Language: Arabic

Road to Kabul (Arabic: الطريق إلي كابول) is a 2012 Moroccan action film directed by Brahim Chkiri. With more than 400000 admissions, the film was a success at the box office.

== Plot ==
Four friends in Casablanca dream of a better life in the Netherlands. When one of them has the opportunity to go, he arrives in Afghanistan instead.

== Cast ==
- Aziz Dadas as Ouchen
- Said Bey as Ali
- Rabie Kati as Masoud
- Amine Ennaji as Mbarek
- Rafik Boubker as Hmida
- Alexandre Ottoveggio as Klurk
