= The Blue Caftan =

2022 film by Maryam Touzani

- Theatrical release poster
- Directed by: Maryam Touzani
- Written by: Maryam Touzani; Nabil Ayouch (collaboration)
- Produced by: Nabil Ayouch
- Starring: Lubna Azabal; Saleh Bakri; Ayoub Missioui
- Cinematography: Virginie Surdej
- Edited by: Nicolas Rumpl
- Music by: Kristian Eidnes Andersen
- Production companies: Les Films du Nouveau Monde; Ali n' Productions; Velvet Films; Snowglobe; RTBF
- Distributed by: Megarama Distribution (Morocco); Ad Vitam Distribution (France); Cinéart (Belgium); Camera Film (Denmark)
- Release dates: 26 May 2022 (Cannes); 22 February 2023 (Morocco); 22 March 2023 (France); 29 March 2023 (Belgium); 7 September 2023 (Denmark)
- Running time: 123 minutes
- Countries: France; Morocco; Belgium; Denmark
- Language: Arabic
- Box office: $2.3 million

The Blue Caftan (Arabic: أزرق القفطان, released in France as Le Bleu du caftan) is a 2022 Moroccan Arabic-language drama film directed by Maryam Touzani, and written by Touzani with the collaboration of Nabil Ayouch.

The film premiered in the Un Certain Regard section at the 2022 Cannes Film Festival, where it won the FIPRESCI Prize in its section. The Moroccan Cinema Center (Centre cinématographique marocain) selected The Blue Caftan to represent Morocco in the 2023 Oscars International Feature Film category, where it made history as the first Moroccan film to be shortlisted for the award.

== Plot ==
Mina works the front counter of a caftan shop in the medina of Salé, Morocco. Halim, her husband is a maalem (master artisan) tailor and works in the back room while he mentors their young apprentice Youssef. The two men are laboring on Halim’s masterpiece project, a blue caftan. The married couple share an affectionate and loving relationship, but head-strong Mina is aware of her meek husband’s same-sex predilection and keeps a wary and hostile eye on Youssef. Meanwhile, Halim frequents a hammam (same-sex bathhouse) where he engages in clandestine sexual activities.

Mina becomes ill from an underlying terminal disease and stops working. Alone at the store, Youssef professes his love for Halim and is rebuffed. As Mina’s condition worsens, Halim works from home to care for her while Youssef takes charge of the business. As he shuttles between the home and the shop, Mina begins to appreciate Youssef and they form a bond.

Shortly before her death, Mina gives her tacit approval for Halim to pursue a loving relationship with Youssef. After she dies, Halim wraps her in the blue caftan, which he has finished at home, and he and Youssef carry her bier, alone, to the cemetery.

== Cast ==
- Lubna Azabal as Mina
- Saleh Bakri as Halim
- Ayoub Missioui as Youssef

== Release ==
The film was selected to be screened in the Un Certain Regard section of the 75th Cannes Film Festival, where it had its world premiere on 26 May 2022.

The film was released in Morocco on 22 February 2023 by Megarama Distribution. Ad Vitam Distribution released the film in France on 22 March 2023. It was also released in Belgium on 29 March 2023 by Cinéart. Danish distributor Camera Film released the film on 7 September 2023.

International sales are handled by Films Boutique.

== Reception ==
=== Box office ===
As of November 2023, The Blue Caftan had sold more than 500,000 tickets worldwide setting a new record for overseas admissions for any recent Moroccan film.

=== Critical response ===
On the review aggregator website Rotten Tomatoes, the film holds an approval rating of 96% based on 54 reviews, with an average rating of 8.3/10. The website's critics consensus reads, "A love story shaped by some surprising contours, The Blue Caftan surveys the hidden heart with compassion and grace." Metacritic, which uses a weighted average, assigned the film a score of 83 out of 100, based on 16 critics, indicating "universal acclaim". The Blue Caftan received an average rating of 3.8 out of 5 stars on the French website AlloCiné, based on 27 reviews.

=== Accolades ===
Award	Date of ceremony	Category	Recipient(s)	Result	Ref.
Belgian Film Critics Association	6 January 2024	Grand Prix	The Blue Caftan	Nominated	
Cannes Film Festival	28 May 2022	FIPRESCI Prize – Un Certain Regard	The Blue Caftan	Won	
Lumière Awards	22 January 2024	Best International Co-Production	The Blue Caftan	Nominated	
Magritte Awards	9 March 2024	Best Actress	Lubna Azabal	Won	
Magritte Awards	9 March 2024	Best Foreign Film in Coproduction	The Blue Caftan	Nominated	
GLAAD Media Award	14 March 2024	Outstanding Film – Limited Release	The Blue Caftan	Nominated	

== See also ==
- List of submissions to the 95th Academy Awards for Best International Feature Film
- List of Moroccan submissions for the Academy Award for Best International Feature Film
