= Rajae Imran =

- Born: 1986; Casablanca
- Occupation: Actress

Rajae Imran or Raja Imrane (Arabic: رجاء عمران, born 1986) is a Moroccan actress and ex- journalist.

== Biography ==
Rajae Imran was born in Casablanca in 1986, into a family with a deep appreciation for the arts, that hails from Doukkala, and she embraced theater acting as part of her school activities. In high school, she participated in a theater play that was attended by former Minister of Culture Mohamed Achaari. One of her professors encouraged her to pursue her studied at the Moroccan Institute of theater (ISADAC).

Imran studied Arabic literature at University of al-Qarawiyyin, then joined ISADAC to study theater, and graduated in 2006.

Imran is married and has 3 children. As of 2023, she resides in the Netherlands.

== Career ==
Rajae Imran is well known for her major role in the TV series Al Mostadaafoun (المستضعفون, The Underdogs) as Aicha with actor Rachid El Ouali, which is her first appearance. She also worked in several Moroccan productions such as Aalach ya waldi?, Wahda men Bezzaf, Machaf Mara.

Additionally, she appeared in some advertisements in Algeria. She stopped her career intermittently to focus on her family.

== Notable works ==
- 2006: Al mostadaafoun (The Underdogs)
- 2009: H'rash
- 2014: Zahr w mrisha
- 2018: Assiham Al-mariqa (Renegades)
- Wahda men Bezzaf
- Machaf Mara
- Aalach ya waldi (why my son..?)
- Rommana w Bertal (Rommana And Bertal)
- R'himu
- H'dit L'yed w L'kettan (Tale of the hand and linen)

== Distinctions ==
- 2010: Best actress at the Theater Festival of Cairo
