= Everybody Loves Touda =

2024 film by Nabil Ayouch

- French theatrical release poster
- Arabic: في حب تودا
- Directed by: Nabil Ayouch
- Written by: Nabil Ayouch; Maryam Touzani
- Produced by: Nabil Ayouch; Amine Benjelloun
- Starring: Nisrin Erradi
- Cinematography: Virginie Surdej
- Edited by: Nicolas Rumpl; Yassir Hamani
- Music by: Flemming Nordkrog; Kristian Selin Eidnes Andersen
- Production companies: Les Films du Nouveau Monde; Ali n' Productions; Velvet Films; Snowglobe; Viking Film; Staer; France 3 Cinéma; RTBF
- Distributed by: Ad Vitam (France)
- Release dates: 17 May 2024 (Cannes); 18 December 2024 (France)
- Running time: 102 minutes
- Countries: Morocco; France; Belgium; Denmark; Netherlands; Norway
- Language: Arabic
- Box office: $1.4 million

Everybody Loves Touda (Arabic: في حب تودا) is a 2024 drama film directed by Nabil Ayouch, co-written with Maryam Touzani. A co-production of Morocco, France, Belgium, Denmark, the Netherlands, and Norway, it stars Nisrin Erradi as a young singer who dreams of becoming a traditional Moroccan folk singer and moving to Casablanca for greater recognition and a better life for her son.

The film had its world premiere in the Cannes Premiere section of the 77th Cannes Film Festival on 17 May 2024. It was selected as the Moroccan submission for the Best International Feature Film at the 97th Academy Awards.

== Cast ==
- Nisrin Erradi as Touda
- Joud Chamihy as Yassine
- Jalila Talemsi as Rkia
- El Moustafa Boutankite as the Violinist
- Lahcen Razzougui as the Lover

== Production ==
Nabil Ayouch wrote the film's screenplay with the collaboration of filmmaker and actress Maryam Touzani, who is also his wife. In preparation for her role, Nisrin Erradi trained with professional Sheikhats for a year and a half. She learned to sing, play percussion, dance and speak as they do. Erradi turned down several roles in between shooting to devote herself to the role of Touda.

Everybody Loves Touda was produced by Nabil Ayouch and Amine Benjelloun for the Moroccan company Ali n' Productions along with French company Les Films du Nouveau Monde, in co-production with Velvet Films (Belgium), Snowglobe (Denmark), Viking Film (Netherlands), Staer (Norway), France 3 Cinéma and RTBF (Télévision Belge).

== Release ==
The film was selected to be screened in the Cannes Premiere section of the 77th Cannes Film Festival, where it had its world premiere on 17 May 2024.

International sales are handled by mk2 Films. The film was set to be released theatrically in France by Ad Vitam on 4 December 2024, but the release date was pushed back to 18 December 2024.

== Reception ==
=== Critical response ===
On the review aggregator website Rotten Tomatoes, 100% of 8 critics' reviews are positive, with an average rating of 7/10. Metacritic, which uses a weighted average, assigned the film a score of 68 out of 100, based on 5 critics, indicating "generally favorable" reviews.

== See also ==
- List of submissions to the 97th Academy Awards for Best International Feature Film
- List of Moroccan submissions for the Academy Award for Best International Feature Film
