= Casablanca Beats =

2021 film

- Directed by: Nabil Ayouch
- Written by: Nabil Ayouch; Maryam Touzani
- Produced by: Nabil Ayouch; Amine Benjelloun
- Starring: Anas Basbousi; Ismail Adouab; Nouhaila Arif; Zineb Boujemaa; Meriem Nakkach; Abdelilah Basbousi
- Cinematography: Amine Messadi; Virginie Surdej
- Edited by: Marie-Hélène Dozo; Julia Gregory; Yassir Hamani
- Music by: Fabien Kourtzer; Mike Kourtzer
- Production companies: Les Films du Nouveau Monde; Ali n' Productions; Unité de Production; Ad Vitam
- Distributed by: Ad Vitam (France)
- Release dates: 15 July 2021 (Cannes); 3 November 2021 (Morocco); 17 November 2021 (France)
- Running time: 102 minutes
- Countries: Morocco; France
- Language: Moroccan Arabic
- Box office: $139,923

Casablanca Beats (Arabic: علي صوتك, romanized: ʿali sawtek, lit. 'raise your voice'; French: Haut et Fort, lit. 'high and loud') is a 2021 Moroccan drama film directed by Nabil Ayouch. In June 2021, the film was selected to compete for the Palme d'Or at the 2021 Cannes Film Festival. The film was produced by Ali n' Productions. It is reportedly the first Moroccan film to be selected to compete for the Palme d'Or since 1962. The film was shot at Les Etoiles de Sidi Moumen, a cultural centre that director Ayouch co-founded with Mahi Binebine in 2014. It was selected as the Moroccan entry for the Best International Feature Film at the 94th Academy Awards.

== Plot ==
In Sidi Moumen, a group of talented teens aspire to put on a rap concert.

== Cast ==
- Anas Basbousi as Anas
- Ismail Adouab as Ismail
- Nouhaila Arif as Nouhaila
- Zineb Boujemaa as Zineb
- Meriem Nakkach as Meriem
- Abdelilah Basbousi as Abdou
- Amina Kannan as Amina
- Mehdi Razzouk as Mehdi
- Soufiane Belalli as Soufiane
- Maha Menan as Maha
- Samah Barigou as Samah
- Marwa Kniniche as Marwa
- Abderrahim Errahman
- Sophia Akhmisse

== See also ==
- List of submissions to the 94th Academy Awards for Best International Feature Film
- List of Moroccan submissions for the Academy Award for Best International Feature Film
