= Adam (2019 Moroccan film) =

2019 film directed by Maryam Touzani

- Film poster
- Directed by: Maryam Touzani
- Written by: Maryam Touzani
- Produced by: Nabil Ayouch
- Starring: Lubna Azabal; Nissrine Erradi; Douae Belkhaouda
- Cinematography: Virginie Surde
- Edited by: Julie Naas
- Production companies: Les Films du Nouveau Monde; Artémis Productions; Ali n' Productions
- Release date: 20 May 2019 (Cannes)
- Running time: 98 minutes
- Country: Morocco
- Language: Arabic

Adam is a 2019 Moroccan drama film directed by Maryam Touzani. It was screened in the Un Certain Regard section at the 2019 Cannes Film Festival. It was selected as the Moroccan entry for the Best International Feature Film at the 92nd Academy Awards, but it was not nominated.

== Plot ==
The film focuses on Samia, a young unwed pregnant mother who goes looking for work and is taken in by a widowed baker, Abla, in Casablanca. The film was inspired by a similar situation Touzani experienced where her parents sheltered a heavily pregnant woman in Tangier for several days during a time when being an unwed pregnant woman was illegal in Morocco.

== Cast ==
- Lubna Azabal as Abla
- Nissrine Erradi as Samia
- Douae Belkhaouda as Warda
- Aziz Hattab as Slimani
- Hasnaa Tamtaoui as Rkia

== Reception ==
On Rotten Tomatoes, the film has an approval rating of 87% based on reviews from 23 critics, with an average rating of 6.6/10.

== See also ==
- List of submissions to the 92nd Academy Awards for Best International Feature Film
- List of Moroccan submissions for the Academy Award for Best International Feature Film
