= Proud =

Proud may refer to:

== Music ==
- Proud (Heather Small album), the debut album by Heather Small
  - "Proud" (Heather Small song), a song by Heather Small that was the official song for the London 2012 Olympic bid
- Proud: An Urban-Pacific Streetsoul Compilation, a New Zealand hip hop compilation album
- "Proud" (2 Chainz song), 2018
- "Proud" (Britannia High song), a 2008 song written for Britannia High and later covered by Susan Boyle
- "Proud" (JLS song), 2012
- "Proud" (Key Glock song), 2022
- "Proud" (Tamara Todevska song), 2019 song that represented North Macedonia in the Eurovision Song Contest 2019
- "Proud", a song by D-Block Europe from The Blue Print: Us vs. Them
- "Proud", a song by Korn from Live & Rare
- "Proud", a song by Rita Ora
- "Proud", a song by Roger Daltrey from Ride a Rock Horse
- "Proud", a song by Todrick Hall from Straight Outta Oz

== Other uses ==
- Proud (surname)
- Proud (film), a 2004 film dramatizing the story of the African American crew of the USS Mason (DE-529)
- Proud (play), a 2009 play by John Stanley
- Proud (TV series), a 2026 Polish drama television series written by Karol Klementewicz and Monika Pęcikiewicz
- PROUD (clinical trial), a clinical trial of post-exposure prophylaxis
- People for Real, Open and United Democracy, a Bulgarian political party
- Proud Island, South Georgia, Atlantic Ocean

== See also ==
- List of people known as the Proud
- Pride, the sense of one's own worth
