= Abdella =

Abdella may refer to:

- Ali Said Abdella (1949–2005), Eritrean politician and diplomat
- Abdella (died 345), priest and fellow martyr of Shemon Bar Sabbae
