= J'ai tant aimé... =

- Directed by: Dalila Ennadre
- Produced by: Aya Films
- Cinematography: Dalila Ennadre
- Edited by: Habiba Bent Jilali
- Release date: 2008
- Running time: 50 minutes
- Countries: France; Morocco

J'ai tant aimé... is a 2008 documentary film.

== Synopsis ==
The documentary describes the life of a Moroccan woman employed as a prostitute in a military brothel by the French Colonial Army who took part in the Indochina War. Past 70, Fadma says she agreed to do the documentary so that France would recognize her as they do their veterans: "I too took part in the war".
