= Abdelilah Abdul-Wahid =

Iraqi footballer

Personal information
- Full name: Abdelilah Abdul-Wahid
- Date of birth: 1 July 1956 (age 70)
- Date of death: 1 July 2000 (aged 44)
- Position: Midfielder

Senior career*
Years	Team	Apps	(Gls)
1975–1982	Al-Zawra'a SC		
1982–1989	Al Shabab		

International career
1979–1980	Iraq		
- * Club domestic league appearances and goals

Abdelilah Abdul-Wahid (Arabic: عَبْد الْإِلَه عَبْد الْوَاحِد; born 1 July 1956) is a former Iraq national football player. He also competed in the men's tournament at the 1980 Summer Olympics.
