= The Damned of the Sea =

- French: Les Damnés de la mer
- Directed by: Jawad Rhalib
- Produced by: Latcho Drom Arte RTBF Irène Productions Clap d’Ort Films
- Cinematography: Olivier Pullincks
- Edited by: Karima Saïdi
- Music by: Hassan Laarousi
- Release date: 2008
- Running time: 71 minutes
- Countries: Belgium; France; Morocco

The Damned of the Sea (French: Les Damnés de la mer) is a 2008 documentary film.

== Synopsis ==
In Dakhla (in the southernmost part of Morocco), one of the richest fishing regions in the world, hundreds of Moroccan fishermen, pushed by the increasing shortage of resources in the north, huddle together in tents sprayed by the ocean. However, their quest for a miraculous catch has revealed itself to be a tragic trap. As they have no licenses, they are sentenced to remain a few yards from the shoreline and catch what they can, while foreign trawlers equipped with the latest in sonar technology, captures the sea's riches to export them to other continents.
