= Christine Jordis =

French writer, journalist and editor

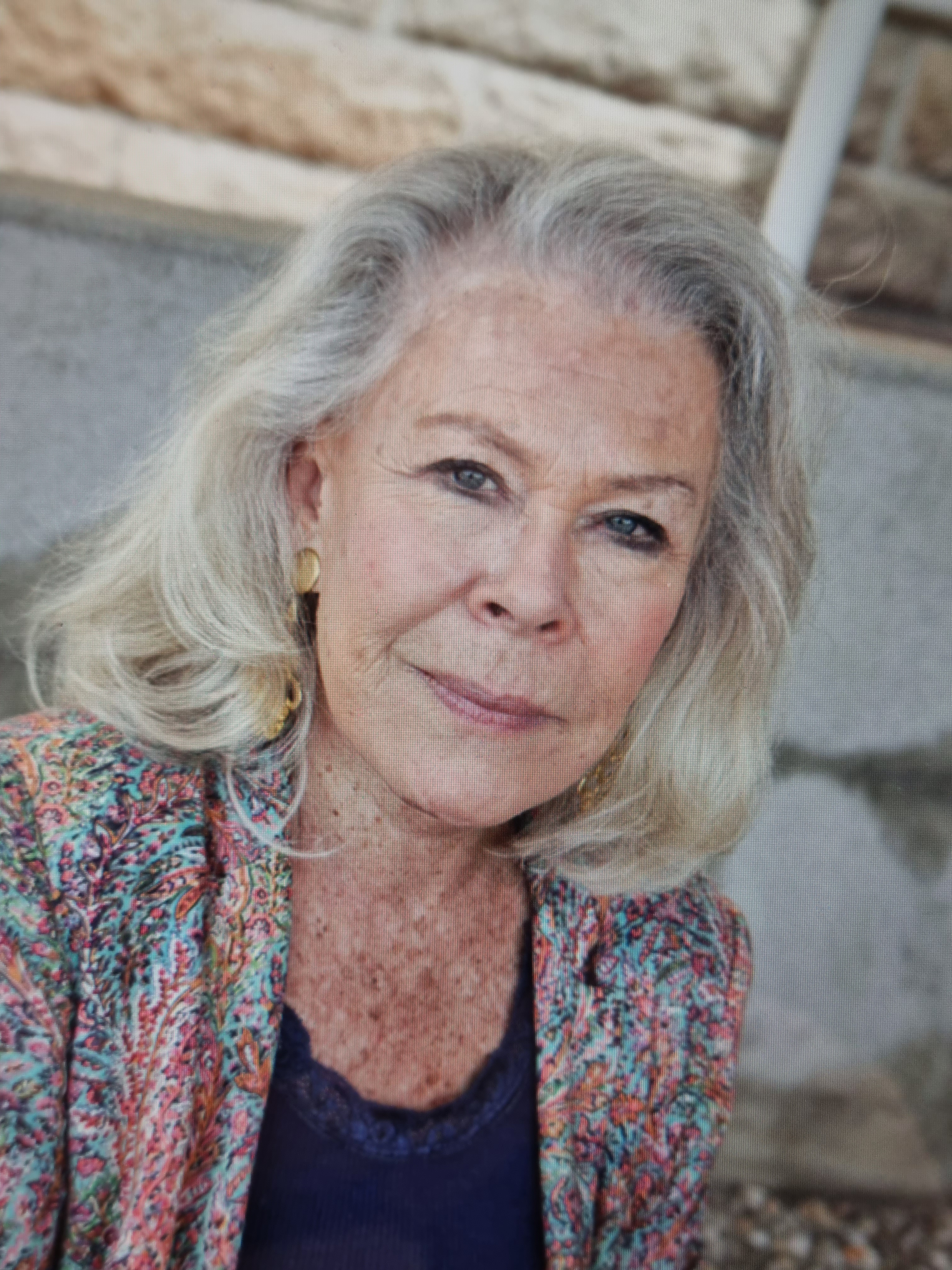

Christine Jordis real name Marie-Christine Morel de Foucaucourt (born 4 January 1942 in Algiers) is a French writer, journalist and editor, a specialist in English literature.

== Biography ==
The daughter of Henri de Foucaucourt, a colonel of Cavalry, banker and journalist, and Charlotte Goüin, Marie-Christine Morel de Foucaucourt married Alexander Jordis-Lohausen.

A graduate of the Sorbonne and Harvard University, she moved to London to prepare her PhD thesis on black humour in English literature and taught there for several years.

On her return to France, she became responsible for English literature at the British Council (1979–1991).

She collaborated with La Nouvelle Revue française, then La Quinzaine littéraire and Le Monde.

From 1991 to 2012, Christine Jordis was director of English fiction at Éditions Gallimard and a member of the reading committee of the publishing house. She has also been a member of the Prix Baudelaire de la traduction since 1985, the Prix du Meilleur Livre Étranger since 1992, the Prix Fémina since 1996, the Prix Cazes since 2006 and the Prix du roman arabe since 2008. She is now a member of the reading committee of Éditions Grasset.

On 15 May 2009 she was made an officer of the Ordre national du Mérite and of the Ordre des Arts et des Lettres.

== Works ==
- 1989: De petits enfers variés, Seuil, (Prix Femina Vacaresco and Prix Marcel-Thiébaut)
- 1996: Jean Rhys, la prisonnière, Stock
- 1999: Gens de la Tamise et d'autre rivages : le roman anglais au XXe siècle, Seuil — Prix Médicis essai
- 1999: Le Paysage et l'Amour dans le roman anglais, Seuil
- 2001: Bali, Java, en rêvant, Éditions du Rocher
- 2003: La Chambre blanche, Seuil
- 2004: Promenade en terres bouddhistes de Birmanie, Seuil
- 2005: Une passion excentrique : Visites anglaises, Seuil, (Prix Valery-Larbaud and Prix Anna de Noailles.)
- 2006: Birmanie, Seuil
- 2006: Gandhi, Gallimard
- 2008: Un lien étroit, Seuil, (Prix Cabourg)
- 2008: Promenades anglaises, Éditions Points
- 2009: L'Aventure du désert, Gallimard
- 2012: Une vie pour l'impossible, Gallimard, (Prix du roman de la Fondation de France Charles Oulmont)
- 2014: William Blake ou l'infini, Albin Michel, (Prix Société des Gens de Lettres de l'essai)
- 2016: Paysage d'hiver. Voyage en compagnie d'un sage, Albin Michel
