= Horses of God =

2012 film

- Film poster
- Directed by: Nabil Ayouch
- Written by: Jamal Belmahi
- Produced by: Frantz Richard
- Starring: Abdelhakim Rachid; Abdelilah Rachid; Hamza Souidek; Ahmed El Idrissi El Amrani; Badr Chakir
- Cinematography: Hichame Alaouié
- Edited by: Damien Keyeux
- Music by: Malvina Meinier
- Release dates: 19 May 2012 (Cannes); 8 February 2013 (Morocco)
- Running time: 115 minutes
- Countries: Morocco; Belgium
- Language: Moroccan Arabic
- Box office: $ 96 277

Horses of God (French: Les chevaux de Dieu, Arabic: يا خيل الله, translit. Ya khayl Allah) is a 2012 Moroccan drama film about the 2003 Casablanca bombings. It was directed by Nabil Ayouch, and based on the novel The Stars of Sidi Moumen by Moroccan writer Mahi Binebine. The film won several awards, and was Morocco's submission for the 86th Academy Awards (held in February 2013).

== Plot ==
The film opens in 1994. Yachine (whose real name is Tarek), (Note: As explained in the film, Tarek is enamored of Lev Yashin, a Russian football goalkeeper, and has adopted Yashin's last name as a nickname.) his violent older brother Hamid, (Note: The boys live with their mother and father. Their father suffers from an unmentioned condition that leaves him constantly confused and affects his memory. Their oldest brother, Karim, joined the Moroccan army and is never seen. Their next oldest brother, Said, is mentally impaired and spends his days listening to radio indoors. Their mother cares for her husband and child, works outside the home, and although seemingly devout watches seedy soap operas on television.) and Yachine's friends Nabil (son of Tamou, a local prostitute and singer), (Note: Beginning as a young boy, Nabil is bullied for being a homosexual and Yachine is taunted for being his lover. Nabil is later depicted applying his mother's lipstick to his mouth, strongly implying that he is, in fact, homosexual.) pot-smoking Fouad, and Khalil live in extreme poverty in Sidi Moumen, a shanty town on the edge of Casablanca in Morocco. Hamid earns money by acting as a drug mule. The boys steal liquor from Khalil's father's wedding, and Hamid rapes a drunk Nabil in front of the others.

In 1999, the shanty town is significantly larger, and Hassan II of Morocco has just died. Yachine, Nabil, Fouad, and Khalil spend their time smoking pot, and Yachine is in love with Ghislaine, Fouad's sister. Hamid is now a major drug dealer, paying off the policeman known as "Pitbull" and forcing Yachine to stay out of the drug business. Religious zealots force Tamou to leave town. Hamid is given a two-year prison sentence after throwing a rock at Pitbull's car. Yachine is forced out of the marketplace in the medina, and Nabil gets him a job repairing engines for repairman Ba'Moussa.

The day after the September 11 attacks, Hamid is released from prison, having given up drugs and embraced radical Islam. Yachine kills Ba'Moussa after the drunk man attempts to rape Nabil. Nabil gets Hamid, and he and his radical friends hide the body. Hamid gives the two refuge in an Islamic compound hidden within the shanty town, and Yachine and Nabil meet with Abou Zoubeir—who begins to recruit them into radical Islam. Nouceir, a former neighborhood enemy and now one of Hamid's close friends, intimidates Khalil and Fouad into joining the cell also. All four begin learning jujutsu. Yachine, feeling immense guilt over murdering Ba'Moussa, spends the night with Nabil. (Note: There film strongly implies that the two have sexual intercourse, and that Hamid is aware of this when he see them together partly undressed the next morning.) But he is also drawn to Zoubeir's message of forgiveness through adherence to radical Islam.

A year later, in November 2002, Tarek (having given up his nickname), Nabil, and Fouad have fully embraced radical Islam. (Note: Fouad is depicted as somewhat more socially conservative than his friends as a teenager, and this appears to be his motivation for embracing radical Islam. Nabil's motivation is less clear, but appears to be an attempt to shed his homosexuality. A leader of the cell later says Nabil has become "a real man", implying he has abandoned or suppressed his same-gender longings.) Zoubeir tells Tarek, Nabil, and Fouad they are being admitted to the innermost councils of the cell, which leaves Hamid jealous and angry. An extensive montage depicts the radicalization of the friends. Tarek learns that Ghislaine is going to marry a cousin.

In February 2003, the police raid a public meeting of radical Muslims, beating Tarek. Abou Zoubeir begins to preach martyrdom to the cell. Tamou attempts to see Nabil, but he refuses to see her or accept her gifts. An unidentified emir arrives and reinforces the message of martyrdom, telling Hamid, Tarek, Fouad, Nabil, and Nouceir, "Take care, children of Islam, never to become like those who cling to life down here and fear to become martyrs. Fly, horses of God, and the gates of paradise will open for you." He selects the four for a suicide mission, and Hamid's jealousy toward Tarek worsens.

9 May, the day of the attack, approaches. Abou Zoubeir flees as the police close in on the cell, and the attack is moved to 16 May. The five men drive into the foothills near Casablanca, which Tarek, Nabil, and Fouad have never seen before. They are amazed at the city's wealth, and surprised to see vast forests and rivers (unlike the desert they have lived in). They camp in the forest, waiting for the day of attack to arrive. Tarek hopes Ghislaine will think fondly of him, once he becomes a martyr. Hamid unsuccessfully attempts to convince Tarek not to go through with the attack. (Note: Tarek warns Hamid that anyone having learned of the attack and who attempts to pull out should be killed. His refusal to expose Hamid finally inverts the long-standing relationship between the two, leaving Tarek the stronger and more aggressive brother.) The men return to the shanty town on 15 May, where they meet with Abou Zoubeir and the 14 others in their cell. They prepare extensively for their mission by shaving, washing, setting watches, and receiving their bombs.

Hamid, Fouad, Tarek, and Nabil enter Casablanca on 16 May, spending the day wandering the city. That night, they approach the Casa de España restaurant. Hamid refuses to let Tarek go through with the attack, but Tarek pushes him away. Fouad flees, not wanting to die. Tarek and Nabil stab and kill the doorman, and enter the club. Two minutes later, they see Hamid through a window of the club. Hamid watches as Tarek and Nabil set off their bombs.

The film ends with children in Sidi Moumen playing football in the dark, and pausing to listen to the explosions in the city. End titles describe the 2003 Casablanca bombings, where they occurred, and how many people died.

== Cast ==
- Abdelhakim Rachid as Tarek/Yachine, the bullied younger brother who dreams of being a football goalie but turns to radical Islam after murdering a man
- Abdelilah Rachid as Hamid, Yachine's older brother and drug dealer who embraces radical Islam in prison but who fears death
- Hamza Souidek as Nabil, Yachine's (possibly homosexual) best friend and the son of a prostitute
- Ahmed El Idrissi El Amrani as Fouad, a friend of Yachine and elder brother of Ghislaine (Yachine's love interest)
- Badr Chakir as Khalil, Yachine's happy-go-lucky friend who fails to embrace radical Islam
- Mohammed Taleb as Abou Zoubeir, the charismatic leader of the Sidi Moumen radical cell
- Mohamed Mabrouk as Nouceir, Yachine's former childhood enemy who has embraced radical Islam
- Imane Benennia as Ghislaine, Fouad's sister and the girl Tarek loves
- Abdallah Ouzzad as Ba'Moussa, the obese and abusive repair shop owner

== Themes ==
Horses of God deals with many themes, including radicalization, terrorism, poverty, machismo, and sexuality. While the film features terrorism and radicalization, the film emphasizes poverty, extreme machismo, and hopelessness over the influence of religion, specifically Islam. By following the main characters from their childhoods into their adulthoods, the film demystifies this impoverished North African community by making their embrace of terrorism frighteningly comprehensible through a sense of tragic inevitability.

In an interview about Horses of God, Nabil Ayouch explained that: "My point of view is not to give moral lessons but to give to understand by showing. At the start of the film, we see 10-year-old kids just like everyone else, with the same dreams. Young Muslims have the same aspirations as young Westerners, we must stop believing that they come from a planet with distant customs...But the environment around them makes everything fall apart. There is a feeling of abandonment: These young people have the impression of being second-class citizens. This is what can lead, in the Arab world and in Morocco in particular, to a drift for those who live in these lawless areas where only religious mafias are able to meet needs that no one else takes."

== Release and awards ==
The film competed in the Un Certain Regard section at the 2012 Cannes Film Festival.

The film won awards in film festivals in Rotterdam, Namur, Brussels, Valladolid, Doha, Besançon, Montpellier, but not in its own country, in the Marrakesh film festival when it was in competition in February 2013. The film was selected as the Moroccan entry for the Best Foreign Language Film at the 86th Academy Awards, but it was not nominated. It received two nominations at the 4th Magritte Awards, winning Best Cinematography for Hichame Alaouié.

== See also ==
- List of submissions to the 86th Academy Awards for Best Foreign Language Film
- List of Moroccan submissions for the Academy Award for Best Foreign Language Film
