= Proud (surname) =

Proud is a surname. Notable people with the surname include:

- Albert Proud (born 1988), Australian rules football player
- Andrew Proud (born 1954), Anglican Bishop
- Bill Proud (1919–1961), English cricketer
- David Proud (born 1983), English actor born with spina bifida
- Geoffrey Proud (1946–2022), Australian painter
- George Proud (1939–2019), Canadian politician from Prince Edward Island
- Peter Proud (1913–1989), British art director
- Richard Proud (1922–2009), American politician from Nebraska
- Ted Proud (1930–2017), British postal historian and philatelic writer
