= Le Dernier cri =

- Directed by: Hamid Basket
- Screenplay by: Hamid Basket
- Produced by: Morocco Movie Group
- Starring: Mohamed Amalki, Saida Baaddi, Saadallah Abdelmajid, Zakaria Atifi
- Cinematography: Fadel Choika
- Edited by: Karim Adraoui
- Music by: Said Alaoui Azizi
- Release date: 2006
- Running time: 20 minutes
- Country: Morocco

Le Dernier cri is a 2006 film from Morocco.

== Synopsis ==
After discovering his mother's adultery, and after his father's death, a child decides to commit suicide to put an end to his suffering.

== Awards ==
- Las Palmas 2007
- Martil 2007
- Film Arabe Argelia 2007
- Ismailia 2007
- Damasco 2007
- Festival Nacional de Cine Marroquí 2007
