= Parcours de réfugiés =

- Directed by: Ali Benjelloun
- Screenplay by: Ali Benjelloun
- Produced by: Hassan Benjelloun Rachida Saadi
- Cinematography: Ali Benjelloun
- Edited by: Siham El Idrissi
- Music by: Ismael Arbaoui
- Release date: 2009
- Running time: 52 minutes
- Country: Morocco
- Language: French

Parcours de réfugiés is a 2009 documentary film about refugees in Morocco, directed by Ali Benjelloun.

== Synopsis ==
Morocco receives many emigrants whose ultimate destination is Europe. About a thousand of these migrants hold a political refugee card from the United Nations High Commissioner for Refugees Agency (UNHCR). However, even those with this card face challenges.

== Awards ==
Parcours de réfugiés was screened at the following festivals:

- Festival Internacional del Cortometraje y del Documental de Casablanca 2010
- Festival Internacional de Cine Documental de Khouribga (FIFDOC) 2010
