= Said Bey =

Moroccan actor and humorist

Saad Bey
- Born: May 10, 1970 (age 56); Ain Taoujdate, Morocco
- Citizenship: Morocco
- Occupations: Actor, Humorist
- Notable work: Jesus (1999)

Saad Bey is a Moroccan actor and humorist.

== Filmography ==
- Jesus (1999)
- The Man Who Sold the World (2009)
- Femmes en miroires (2011)
- Road To Kabul (2011)
- Son of God (2014)
- Urgent (2018)
