= Aziz Dadas =

Moroccan actor (born 1968)

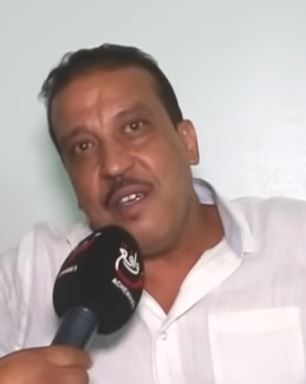
- Born: 16 May 1968 (age 57); Casablanca
- Citizenship: Morocco
- Occupation: Actor
- Notable work: The Hook

Aziz Dadas (born 16 May 1968 in Casablanca) is a Moroccan actor. He is known for starring alongside comedian Saïd Naciri, working with him in a number of acts such as The Rebbe, Al-Aouni, Playing with Wolves, The Hook, and for appearing in the successful Moroccan series Hour in Hell which aired on Al Aoula Channel. However, when he participated in the Moroccan comedy film The Way to Kabul, he was aired. He also appeared on the series Hdidan in Gueliz in 2017.

== Work ==
=== Movies ===
- Play with wolves (2004)
- Pair of balls (2008)
- The hook (2010)
- Road to Kabul (2012)
- The Zero (2012)
- Wolves that don't sleep (2014)
- Olive Riad (2015)
- Midnight Orchestra (2015)
- Green March (2016)
- Dalas (2016)
- The sneeze (2016)
- serpent (2017)
- My Uncle (2017)
- in Wonderland (2017)
- A cry from another world (2018)
- Catharsys or The Afina Tales of the Lost World (2018) (2019)
- Masoud Saida and Saadan (2020)

=== Series ===
- The stepson
- Al Aouni
- An Hour in Hell
- Hdidan in Gueliz
- Never Mind (series)
- Ouchan
- Ali Boys (series)
- Hdidan at the Pharaohs
- The Past Doesn't die
- Hami Wlad Aami
- Country Side (Serie)

=== Programmes ===
- Rachid Show (Guest)
- I have something to help (Guest)
- Face à Face (Guest)
- FBM (Guest)
