= Sextape (2018 film) =

2018 film

- Film poster
- Directed by: Antoine Desrosières
- Written by: Antoine Desrosières
- Starring: Souad Arsane
- Release dates: 10 May 2018 (Cannes); 6 June 2018 (France)
- Running time: 98 minutes
- Country: France
- Language: French

Sextape (French: À genoux les gars) is a 2018 French comedy film directed by Antoine Desrosières. It was screened in the Un Certain Regard section at the 2018 Cannes Film Festival. Film critic Lisa Nesselson writing for Screen Daily found the film was "an invaluable and frank conversation-starter in the arena of what constitutes sexual harassment and what can be done about reducing it", while Todd McCarthy writing for The Hollywood Reporter called it "a nugget of truth wrapped in a gross and vulgar package." It had a theatrical release in France on 6 June 2018.

== Cast ==
- Souad Arsane as Yasmina
- Inas Chanti as Rim
- Loubna Abidar as The mother
