= Driss Roukhe =

Moroccan actor and director

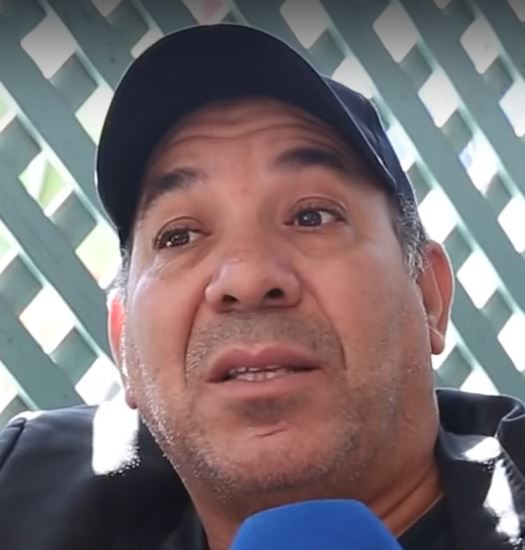
- Born: July 5, 1968 (age 57); Meknes, Morocco
- Citizenship: Morocco
- Occupations: Actor, director
- Years active: 1993–present

Driss Roukhe (born July 5, 1968) is a Moroccan actor and director.

== Early life ==
Roukhe was born in Dyour Jdad B’ni M’Hamed, a poor neighborhood of Meknes, and lost his father when he was 7. He practiced theater in high-school and with various youth associations. He later joined the High Institute of Theatrical Arts and Cultural Animation (ISADAC) where he was formally trained as an actor.

He first appeared in the Moroccan director Ahmed Essyad's opera, Le Collier des ruses, in 1993.

== Works ==
=== Films ===
- Un aller simple (2001) as Omar
- La chambre noire (2004)
- Le Regard (2005) as Ramzi
- Syriana (2005) as Guard
- Babel (2006) as Alarid
- The Situation (2006) as Walid
- Les Anges de Satan (2007) as Kader
- Rendition (2007) as Bahi
- Arn: The Knight Templar (2007) as Fakhr
- Number One (2008) as Toro
- Arn – The Kingdom at Road's End (2008) as Fakhr
- Secret défense (2008) as Natrif
- Gud, lukt och henne (2008)
- Casanegra (2008) as Adil's stepfather
- Die zwei Leben des Daniel Shore (2009) as Commandant
- Green Zone (2010) as Tahir al-Malik
- 37 Kilometers Celsius (Short) (2009)
- Pegase (2011) as Chrif
- Agadir Bombay (2011)
- Love in the Medina (2011) as the Le Mokkadem
- Ben X (2011)
- Or noir (2011) as Magrouf (English title: Day of the Falcon)
- L'enfant cheikh (2012)
- Agent Hamilton: But Not If It Concerns Your Daughter (2012) as Arahan
- Entropya (Short) (2013) as Husband
- Traitors (2013) as Haj
- L'esclave Du Mâle (Short) (2014) as Chief Inspector Bougati

=== Television ===
- The Passion (TV serial) episode #1.2 (2008) as Roman Soldier at Procession
- The Grid (TV mini-series) (2004) as Saudi Customs Officer
