= Razzia (2017 film) =

2017 film

- Film poster
- Directed by: Nabil Ayouch
- Written by: Nabil Ayouch
- Starring: Maryam Touzani
- Release dates: 9 September 2017 (TIFF); 14 February 2018 (Morocco)
- Running time: 119 minutes
- Country: Morocco
- Languages: Moroccan Arabic; Berber; French

Razzia (from Arabic: غزية, romanized: ghazia, lit. 'Raid', romanized according to French orthography into "Razzia") is a 2017 Moroccan drama film directed by Nabil Ayouch. It was selected as the Moroccan entry for the Best Foreign Language Film at the 90th Academy Awards, but it was not nominated. Razzia is mostly set in Casablanca and characters frequently discuss the 1942 film Casablanca.

== Plot ==
In Casablanca and the Atlas Mountains, five different stories interconnect over a 30-year period.

== Cast ==
- Maryam Touzani as Salima
- Arieh Worthalter as Joe
- Amine Ennaji as Abdallah
- Abdelilah Rachid as Hakim
- Dounia Binebine as Inès
- Abdellah Didane as Ilyas

== See also ==
- List of submissions to the 90th Academy Awards for Best Foreign Language Film
- List of Moroccan submissions for the Academy Award for Best Foreign Language Film
