= Alaa Eddine Aljem =

Moroccan film director and screenwriter

- علاء الدين الجم
- Born: 29 November 1988 (age 37); Rabat, Morocco
- Education: The Superior School of Visual Arts of Marrakech
- Occupation: Director
- Notable work: The Unknown Saint

Alaa Eddine Aljem (Arabic: علاء الدين الجم; 29 November 1988), is a Moroccan director and screenwriter.

== Biography ==
Aljem was born on 29 November 1988 in Rabat. He is a graduate of the Superior School of Visual Arts of Marrakech (ESAV Marrakech). He also studied at the Institut National Supérieur des Arts du Spectacle et des Techniques de Diffusion (INSAS) in Brussels for a master's degree in directing, production and screenwriting. After working as a scriptwriter and assistant director for film and television, he founded the production company Le Moindre Geste in Casablanca alongside producer Francesca Duca.

He began his career as a director with three short films. In 2015, he directed the short fiction film Les poissons du désert, which won the Grand Prize for Best Short Film, the critics' award and the screenplay award at the National Film Festival of Morocco.

In 2016, he was chosen by Screen International Magazine as one of the five rising stars of the Arab world.

In May 2019, his first feature film, The Unknown Saint, a Franco-Moroccan co-production, was screened at the Cannes Film Festival's Critics' Week. The film was nominated for the Caméra d'Or and was also screened at several festivals in Europe, America, Asia and Australia. The film was also well received by critics and the public and was selected to represent Morocco at the Oscars in 2021.

== Filmography ==
=== Feature films ===
- 2019: The Unknown Saint

=== Short films ===
- 2008: Alaa's Ritual (Le rituel d'Alaa)
- 2009: National Education
- 2011: Tribute
- 2013: The Third Hand (Troisième main)
- 2015: The Desert Fish (Les poissons du désert)
