= Rachid El Ouali =

Moroccan actor

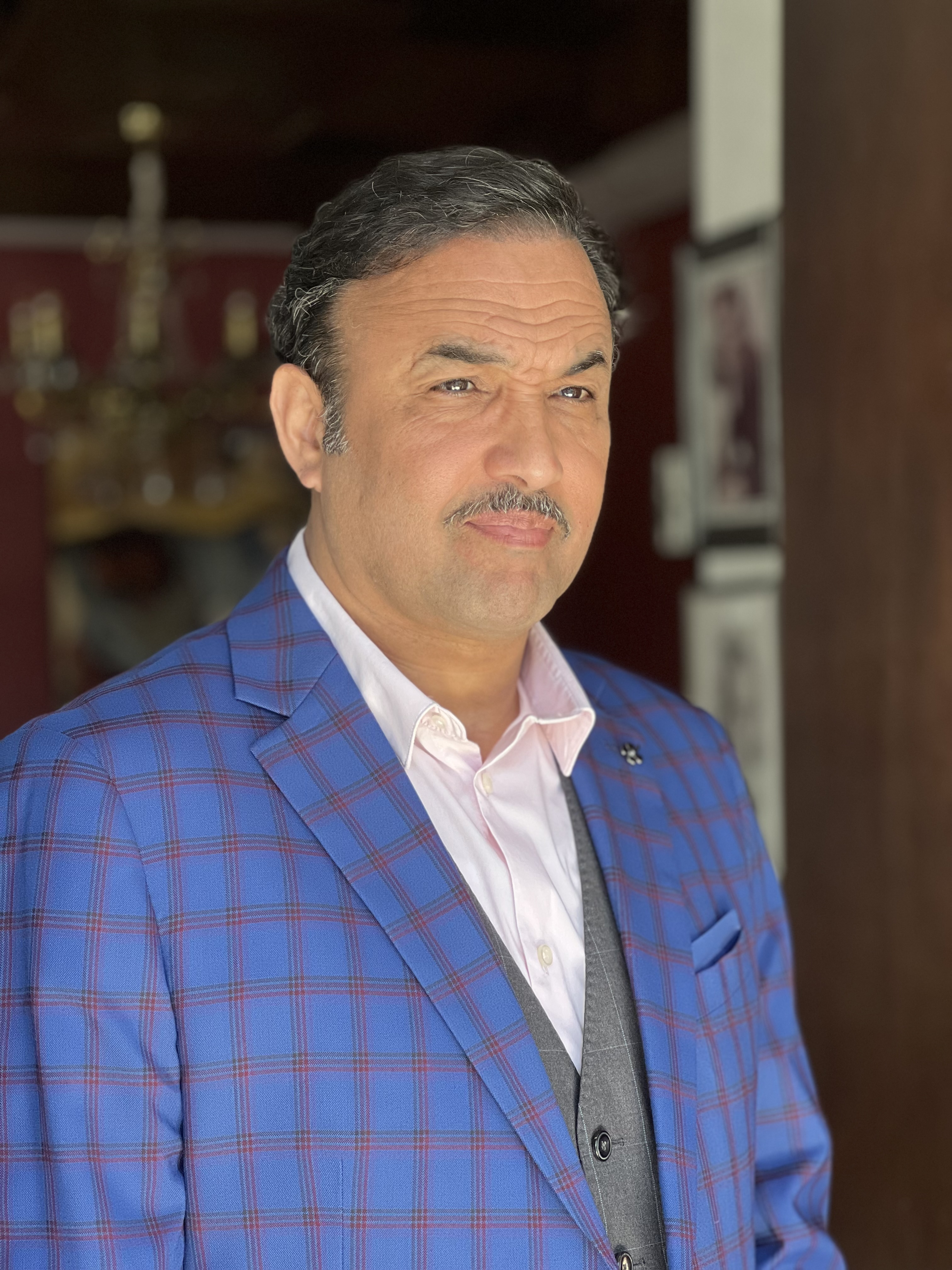
- Rachid El Ouali in 2023
- Born: April 3, 1965 (age 61); Rabat, Morocco
- Citizenship: Morocco
- Occupations: Actor film director producer tv host
- Years active: 1988–present

Rachid El Ouali (Arabic: رشيد الوالي; born April 3, 1965) is a Moroccan actor, producer, director and TV host. He participated in several Moroccan and foreign films and series, and is considered one of the most successful and famous Moroccan actors, as he won many national and international awards.

== Career ==
El Ouali started acting at the end of the 1980s. He showed proficiency in his major role in the drama TV serial Flock of Pigeons (سرب الحمام، Serb Al Hamam). He starred in the famous television comedy series Hossein & Safia (الحسين و الصافية، El Hossein w Safia) with actress Samia Akariou. In 2006 Rachid El Ouali acted in the drama TV-serial Al Mostadaafon(المستضعفون،The Underdogs) with actress Rajae Imran. He also starred in several successful movies such as Obsessions After Midnight (هواجس بعد منتصف الليل، Hawajes baada montassaf el leil), a drama horror movie where he took the leading role with actress Majida Benkirane. Besides his acting career, he also directed several short films and sitcoms such as: Ninni ya Moummou, Nass El Houma, L'Aube, and La mouche et moi.

== Filmography ==
Film

- 2018 Nooh Laa Yaarifu Laawm (Noah Can't Swim)
- 2015 Domouaa Ebliss (Satan's Tears)
- 2015 Ahlam Moajjala (Postponed Dreams) as "Abdel Hay"
- 2015 Hafid El Haj
- 2013 Marhaban wa awili as "Khaled"
- 2013 Yemma as "Boujmaa"
- 2011 Nhar Tzad Tfa Dou as "Said"
- 2011 Dilal Al mawt as (Hamid's father)
- 2010 Oulad El Blad (Land's progeny) as "El Mefddel"
- 2009 Rass Lmhayn as "El Hossein"
- 2007 Wadaan Ommahat (Farewell Mothers!) as "Ibrahim"
- 2007 Al Bahet as "Salah"
- 2006 Abwab Al Janna (Gates of Heaven)
- 2006 Assefa Abi (I'm Sorry... Dad) as "Ibrahim"
- 2005 A'lach Lae? (Why not?) as "Aanbar"
- 2005 Baed Aan Al Aain
- 2005 Al ajneha Al Monkacera (The Broken Wings)
- 2005 Fiha Lmelha w Sekkar o mazal mabghatch Tmout 2 (She's diabetic & hypertensive yet won't die 2)
- 2004 Assdiqae men Canada (Friends from Canada) 2004 as "Shoukri"
- 2004 Majeda as "El Hossein"
- 2004 Layali Baidae (White Nights) as "Nabil"
- 2004 Kharif Al ahlam as "Omar"
- 2004 Hna w Lhih (Here & There)
- 2003 Aallal El Qelda as "Aallal"
- 2003 Al Dobaba El Baydae (The White Fly)
- 2002 Jarima wa Tahqiq (Crime & Inquiry)
- 2002 Lailat El majnoun as "Inspector Hakim"
- 2001 Gharamiyat El haj El Mokhtar Souldi (The Adventures of Hadj Mokhtar Souldi)
- 2001 Et après...Wa baad
- 2001 Mohakamat Imraea (A Woman's Trial)
- 2001 El milaf El azraq (The Blue File)
- 2001 Al bakma (The Mute)
- 2001 Dar Al bidae ya Dar Al bidae (Casablanca Casablanca)
- 2001 Rass Laain as "Inspector"
- 2000 Chadia (Chadia)
- 1999 Keid Nssae (Women's Machination)
- 1999 Massir Imraea (A Woman's Fate)
- 1999 Hawajis Baada Montassaf Leil (Obsessions After Midnight) as "Adel"
- 1999 Fiha Lmelha w Sekkar o mazal mabghatch Tmout 1 (She's diabetic & hypertensive yet won't die 1)
- 1997 Aabbirou Fi Samtt
- 1997 Solomon (Solomon)
- 1996 Mektoub (Fate) as "Taoufiq"
- 1996 Safar ila Lmadi (Travel to the Past)
- 1995 Nehaya Saaida (Happy End)
- 1994 Sareq Al Ahlam (The Dreams Thief)
- 1991 Leilat El jarima (Night of the Crime)
- 1989 Hob Fi Dar El Bayda (Love in Casablanca)

Play

- 1991 Sadafa Hemmadi

TV Series

- 2011 Houssein et Safia (Hossein & Safia) as "El Hossein"
- 2006 Al Mostadaafoun (The Underdogs) as "Taher"
- 2006 Al Boad El akhar (The Other Dimension) 'he played different roles'
- 2003 Rabia Qortoba as "Hesham Al Msshafi"
- 2002 Khalkhal Al Batoul (The Anklet of Batoul) as "S'llam"
- 2000 Serb El Hamam (Flock of Pigeons) as "Hemmadi"
- 1999 Al wasiyya
- 1999 El Mossabon
- 1992 Hout El Barr
- 1992 Delal Al Madi (Shadows of the Past)

Short Films

- 2011 Plastic
- 2004 Ninni ya Moumou
- 2003 El Akhar (The Other)

Sitcoms

- 2002 Sofian
- 2013 Nass El Houma

TV programs

- Lalla Laaroussa (Ms. Bride)
- Man sayarbah Al-million? (Who Wants to Be a Millionaire?)
