= Much Loved =

- Film poster
- Directed by: Nabil Ayouch
- Written by: Nabil Ayouch
- Produced by: Saïd Hamich Benlarbi; Eric Poulet; Nabil Ayouch
- Starring: Loubna Abidar; Asmaa Lazrak
- Cinematography: Virginie Surdej
- Edited by: Damien Keyeux
- Music by: Mike Kourtzer
- Production company: Celluloid Dreams
- Distributed by: Pyramide Distribution (France)
- Release dates: 19 May 2015 (Cannes); 16 September 2015 (France)
- Running time: 100 minutes (theatrical); 184 minutes (workprint)
- Countries: Morocco; France
- Language: Moroccan
- Box office: $1.3 million

Much Loved (also known as Zin Li Fik) is a 2015 French-Moroccan drama film directed by Nabil Ayouch about the prostitution scene in Marrakesh. It was screened in the Directors' Fortnight section at the 2015 Cannes Film Festival. The film has been banned in Morocco for alleged "contempt for moral values and the Moroccan woman". It was screened in the Contemporary World Cinema section of the 2015 Toronto International Film Festival.

It is one of the first films to address the issue of prostitution in Morocco. Following the lives of four female sex workers, it brings to the forefront the exploitation of prostitutes by pimps, and the corruption of the police who sometimes even profit from the trade. The film stirred a national debate before it was released when rushes were stolen and leaked on the web. The lead actress received death threats, and religious authorities condemned the film for portraying a negative image of Morocco, with its portrayals of extramarital sex and sympathetic views towards homosexuals.

== Cast ==
- Loubna Abidar as Noha
- Asmaa Lazrak as Randa
- Halima Karaouane as Soukaina
- Sara Elmhamdi Elalaoui as Hlima
- Abdellah Didane as Said
- Danny Boushebel as Ahmad

== Production ==
Loubna Abidar deceived the filmmaker Nabil Ayouch during the casting process, going so far as to disguise herself as a prostitute to pass the casting.

== Accolades ==
Award / Film Festival	Category	Recipients and nominees	Result
César Awards	Best Actress	Loubna Abidar	Nominated
Lumière Awards	Best French-Language Film		Won
