= Burnout (film) =

2017 film

- Film poster
- Directed by: Nour-Eddine Lakhmari
- Written by: Nour-Eddine Lakhmari
- Starring: Morjana Alaoui
- Cinematography: Wesley Mroziński
- Edited by: Sarah M
- Music by: Øistein Boassen
- Release date: 11 October 2017
- Running time: 112 minutes
- Country: Morocco
- Language: Arabic

Burnout is a 2017 Moroccan drama film directed by Nour-Eddine Lakhmari. It was selected as the Moroccan entry for the Best Foreign Language Film at the 91st Academy Awards, but it was not nominated.

== Cast ==
- Morjana Alaoui as Ines
- Sarah Perles as Aida
- Anas El Baz as Jad
- Ilyass Eljihani as Ayoub
- Driss Roukhe as Mr. Faridi
- Saadia Ladib as Rabia
- Fatima ezzahra El Jaouhari as Soumaya
- Mohamed Khiyari as Ronda

== See also ==
- List of submissions to the 91st Academy Awards for Best Foreign Language Film
- List of Moroccan submissions for the Academy Award for Best Foreign Language Film
