= Laïla Marrakchi =

Moroccan director, screenwriter (born 1975)

- ليلى المراكشي
- Marrakchi in 2026
- Born: 10 December 1975 (age 50); Casablanca, Morocco
- Occupation: Filmmaker
- Notable work: Marock
- Spouse: Alexandre Aja

Laila Marrakchi (born 10 December 1975) is a Franco-Moroccan filmmaker. Most known for her drama film Marock (2005).

== Education and Career ==
Marrakchi studied at Lyautey High School, a French high school in Casablanca. She holds a Master's degree in Film and Audiovisual Studies from Paris III University.

She assisted the director on various films and directed her first short film in 2000, L’Horizon perdu. Two documentaries later (Femmes en royaume chérifien and Derrière les portes du hammam in 2001), another short film, Deux cents dirhams, was presented at the Namur International Francophone Film Festival in 2002.

Her first feature film, Marock (2005), was produced in 2004 and screened in the Un Certain Regard section at the 2005 Cannes Film Festival. It portrays the privileged youth of Casablanca, with their Westernized customs, but confronted by the prejudices of traditional society when a first love brings a young Muslim woman and a young Jewish man together.

Her second feature film, Rock the Casbah (2013), had its premiere at the Special Presentation section in the 2013 Toronto International Film Festival. In another personal tale about her native Casablanca, starring Arab popular actors Nadine Labaki, Hiam Abbass and Omar Sharif.

Her feature film, Strawberries, followed the Moroccan diaspora in Spain. The film had its world premiere in the Un Certain Regard section of the 2026 Cannes Film Festival. It was later selected as the Moroccan submission for the Best International Feature Film at the 99th Academy Awards.

In May 2026, Marrakchi was named among the six honorees for the Women in Cinema Gala hosted by the Red Sea Film Foundation during the 2026 Cannes Film Festival.

== Personal life ==
Marrakchi is married to French filmmaker Alexandre Aja, son of filmmaker Alexandre Arcady.

== Filmography ==
=== Feature films ===
Year	English Title	Original Title
2005	Marock	
2013	Rock the Casbah	
2026	Strawberries	La más dulce

=== Short films ===
- L' Horizon perdu (2000)
- 200 Dirhams (2002)
- Momo mambo (2003)

=== Documentaries ===
- Femmes en royaume chérifien (2001)
- Derrière les portes du hammam (2001)
- Zwaj El Waqt (2017)

=== Television ===
- The Bureau (2015-2018)
- The Eddy (2020), episodes 5 and 6
- L'Opéra (2021)
- Carême (2025)

== See also ==
- Sanaa Hamri
