= The Red Moon (film) =

2013 film

The Red Moon القمر الأحمر
- Directed by: Hassan Benjelloun
- Written by: Bachir Qermane
- Starring: Fattah Ngadi
- Release date: 8 February 2013
- Running time: 117 minutes
- Country: Morocco
- Language: Arabic

The Red Moon (القمر الأحمر) is a 2013 Moroccan drama film directed by Hassan Benjelloun. It was selected as the Moroccan entry for the Best Foreign Language Film at the 87th Academy Awards, but was not nominated.

== Cast ==
- Fattah Ngadi
- Fatine Hilal Bik
- Wassila Sobhi
- Fatim Zahra Benacer
- Abdellatif Chaouki
- Abderrahim El Meniar
- Mehdi Malakane
- Khadija Jamal

== See also ==
- List of submissions to the 87th Academy Awards for Best Foreign Language Film
- List of Moroccan submissions for the Academy Award for Best Foreign Language Film
