= Marock =

2005 Moroccan film

- Marock
- Directed by: Laïla Marrakchi
- Written by: Laïla Marrakchi
- Produced by: Stéphanie Carreras
- Starring: Morjana Alaoui; Mathieu Boujenah; Assaad Bouab
- Cinematography: Maxime Alexandre
- Edited by: Pascale Fenouillet
- Distributed by: Pan Européenne Distribution
- Release date: 2005
- Running time: 100 minutes
- Countries: Morocco; France
- Languages: Arabic; French

Marock is the 2005 Moroccan film by director Laïla Marrakchi. The film was 2006's most successful film in Morocco, taking more than 3 million dirhams at the Moroccan box-office, according to TelQuel. It deals with a Muslim-Jewish romantic relationship between two young people in Casablanca, Morocco, Rita and Youri.

The film was shown in Moroccan cinemas without being edited or censored. The title Marock is a play on words based on the French name for Morocco, Maroc, and rock as in rock 'n' roll. It was screened in the Un Certain Regard section at the 2005 Cannes Film Festival.

== Cast ==
- Morjana Alaoui – Rita Belghiti
- Matthieu Boujenah – Youri Benchekri
- Razika Simozrag – Asmaa
- Fatym Layachi – Sofia
- Assaad Bouab – Mao
- Rachid Benhaissan – Driss
- Khalid Maadour – Omar
- Michael Souda – Mehdi

== Critical reception ==
The film received 3 stars out of 4 from the critic Alain Spira in Paris Match: "Marrakchi depicts, in an original way, the young jet set of her country. [...] Hypocritical religion, arranged marriages, the Judeo-Arab rivalry, nothing is spared. But Marock is also a great cry of love for her country with its generous spirit and matchless style for living."

Marock was nominated for "Best Film" at the Sydney Film Festival and for the Contemporary World Cinema Award at the Toronto International Film Festival. It won the Coup de Cœur Audience Award at the Sarlat International Cinema Festival.
