= Nour-Eddine Lakhmari =

Moroccan filmmaker and musician

- نور الدين الخماري
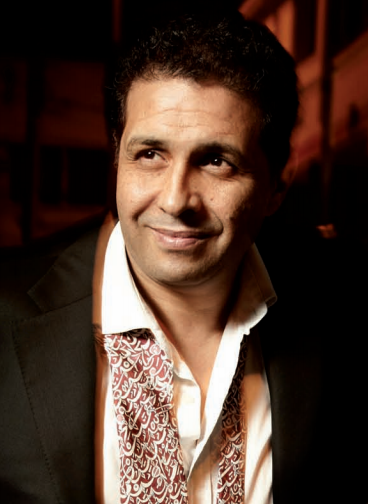
- Nourredine Lakhmari in 2013
- Born: February 15, 1964 (age 62); Safi, Morocco
- Occupations: Instrumentalist, singer, choreographer, film director

Nour-Eddine Lakhmari (Arabic: نور الدين الخماري) is a Moroccan instrumentalist, singer, choreographer and film director.

== Biography ==
Based in Italy, Nour-Eddine has been involved in various groups specializing in ethnic, traditional music of the desert, with whom he has performed both in Italy and abroad. These collaborators include Azahara, Desert Sound and Jajouka.

Also a filmmaker, Nour-Eddine's most famous movie was the award-winning Casanegra.

In 2018, his latest film Burnout was selected for the Brussels International Film Festival.

== Career ==
=== Discography ===
- The Music of Morocco

=== Filmography ===
- 2005: Le regard (The gaze)
- 2008: Casanegra
- 2012: Zero
- 2017: Burnout
