= Rock the Casbah (2013 film) =

2013 film

- Film poster
- Directed by: Laïla Marrakchi
- Written by: Laïla Marrakchi
- Starring: Morjana Alaoui
- Cinematography: Pierric Gantelmi d'Ille
- Edited by: Jennifer Augé
- Music by: Laurent Garnier; Robin Coudert
- Production companies: Estrella; Pathé; Agora Films
- Distributed by: Pathé Distribution
- Release dates: 13 September 2013 (TIFF); 11 September 2013 (France)
- Running time: 100 minutes
- Countries: France; Morocco
- Languages: French; English; Arabic

Rock the Casbah is a 2013 French-Moroccan drama film written and directed by Laïla Marrakchi. It was screened in the Special Presentation section at the 2013 Toronto International Film Festival.

== Plot ==
After Moroccan entrepreneur Moulay Hassan (Omar Sharif) abruptly dies of a heart attack members of his family come together for a three-day mourning period over his death. Foremost among the mourners are Aicha (Hiam Abbass), his wife, and his three daughters Miriam (Nadine Labaki), Kenza (Lubna Azabal) and Sofia (Morjana Alaoui).

Sofia is someone estranged from her family, having left Morocco to act in Hollywood years before. Furthering the rift between her and her family is the fact that her older sister Leyla committed suicide years before, in part because Moulay was controlling towards her and refused to let her marry Zakaria, the son of their maid, who she was in love with.

Despite trying to reconnect with her family Sofia finds herself feuding with them when they discover that she is divorcing her American husband and is critical of her sisters' decisions to marry Moroccan men whom their father approved of but whom they do not love. Sofia temporarily leaves her mourning family to spend time with Zakaria but fights with him after he leaves her at a club to go have sex with the mother of his child in the bathroom. Fighting with Zakaria, Sofia learns that her sister Leyla was pregnant when she committed suicide.

While going through her father's things Sofia finds a picture of Zakaria with her father and the maid looking like a family. She realizes that Zakaria was her father's biological son making him her half-brother. Zakaria also receives a call from the executor of Moulay's estate and learns that he was Moulay's son, and also his heir.

At the reading of the will the other sisters discover the truth including the fact that Aicha knew that Zakaria was Moulay's son. Initially horrified, they decide to forgive their mother after she tells them that she remained silent to preserve family unity. Furthermore, she encourages Zakaria to accept his inheritance, which is greater than that of the sisters as he is the sole male heir.

Reconciled, the entire family gathers together to watch old home movies from when the sisters were little girls. They are interrupted by the arrival of Sofia's husband who left the set of his latest film to reunite with her.

== Cast ==
- Morjana Alaoui as Sofia
- Nadine Labaki as Miriam
- Lubna Azabal as Kenza
- Hiam Abbass as Aicha
- Omar Sharif as Moulay Hassan
