= Casanegra (film) =

2008 Moroccan film

- Directed by: Nour-Eddine Lakhmari
- Written by: Nour-Eddine Lakhmari
- Starring: Anas El Baz; Omar Lotfi; Ghita Tazi; Mohamed Benbrahim; Driss Roukh
- Release date: 24 December 2008 (Morocco)
- Running time: 131 minutes
- Country: Morocco
- Language: Moroccan Arabic ( Darija )

Casanegra is a 2008 Moroccan drama film directed by Nour-Eddine Lakhmari. It was nominated by Morocco to compete for the Academy Award for Best International Feature Film at the 82nd Academy Awards.

== Plot ==
Two childhood friends, Karim and Adil, prowl the streets of Casablanca, their native city. They do not do much, in fact they hustle rather than work. They are also unashamed ambitious dreamers, Karim believing in his "love story" with Nabila, a rich girl, and Adil contemplating emigrating to Sweden but never taking action. One day, the two friends go onto top gear by getting themselves into a big caper.
