= Nabil Ayouch =

Franco-Moroccan television and film director, producer, and writer

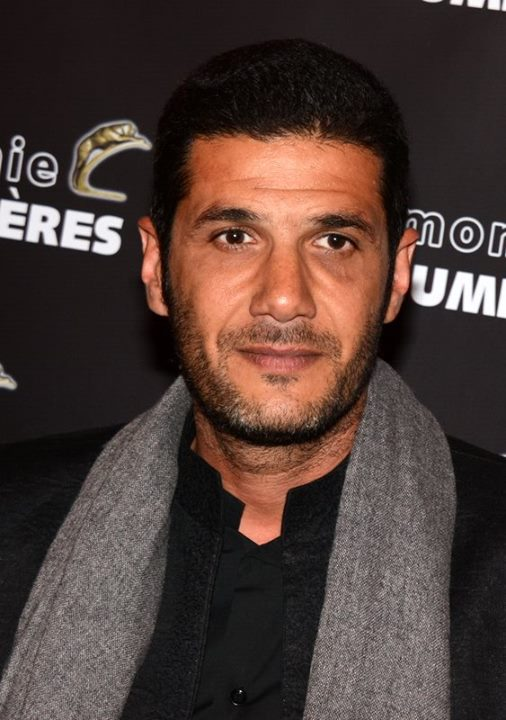
- Born: 1 April 1969 (age 57); Paris, France
- Occupations: Film director, producer, and screenwriter
- Years active: 1992–present
- Notable work: Les Pierres bleues du désert (1992)
- Spouse: Maryam Touzani
- Father: Noureddine Ayouch

Nabil Ayouch (born 1 April 1969) is a Franco-Moroccan television and film director, producer, and writer. His films have been screened at international film festivals including the Cannes Film Festival and Montreal World Film Festival.

== Early life ==
Ayouch was born in 1969 in Paris, to a Moroccan father, Noureddine Ayouch and a French mother of Tunisian-Jewish descent. His brother is fellow director Hicham Ayouch. After his parents' divorce, he spent a large part of his childhood in the suburb of Sarcelles, visiting Casablanca in the summers.

Ayouch cites discovering international cinema at the local cultural center, Forum des Cholettes, as inspiring his filmmaking career.

== Film career ==
Ayouch started his career as a scriptwriter and director with the advertising agency Euro-RSCG. In 1992, he directed Les Pierres bleues du désert, a first short film with Jamel Debbouze, which tells the history of a young man convinced that there are large blue stones in the desert.

In 1993, Ayourch ended up settling in Casablanca, where he directed two short films, Hertzienne Connexion (1993) and Vendeur de silence (1994), for which he received international recognition.

In 1997, Ayouch directed his first feature film Mektoub, which represented Morocco at the Oscars. He also directed the feature films Une Minute de soleil en moins (2003) and Whatever Lola Wants (2008), produced by Pathé.

In 1999, Ayouch created a production company called Ali n'Productions to aid aspiring young directors in establishing their careers. He won the Ecumenical Award in 2000 in the Montreal World Film Festival for his film Ali Zaoua: Prince of the Streets. Ayouch is set to produce the French-Moroccan thriller film Mirages.

Ayouch's 2012 film Horses of God is based on Mahi Binebine’s novel The Stars of Sidi Moumen. In Horses of God, Ayouch explores the radicalization that can occur from poverty and extreme machismo, alluding to the 2003 Casablanca bombings. The film competed in the Un Certain Regard section at the 2012 Cannes Film Festival. It was also Morocco's submission for the 85th Academy Awards (held in February 2013).

In 2021, Ayouch's film Casablanca Beats was selected for the 74th Cannes Film Festival competition.

In February 2025, Ayouch joined the competition jury at the 75th Berlin International Film Festival, presided over by Todd Haynes.

Ayouch is a member of the Academy of Motion Pictures, the Académie des Césars, and the Arab Film Academy.

== Controversy ==
Ayouch's film Much Loved, which takes place in Marrakesh, caused a stir due to its unsimulated sex scenes especially the scene where Loubna Abidar performed an unsimulated fellatio on a man. The movie was ultimately banned in Morocco.

== Personal life ==
Ayouch works and lives in Casablanca. He is married to fellow Moroccan filmmaker and actress Maryam Touzani.

== Filmography ==
=== Feature films ===
Year	English title	Original title	Notes
1992	The Blue Stones of the Desert	Les Pierres bleues du désert	
1997	Mektoub	مكتوب	
2000	Ali Zaoua	Ali Zaoua, prince de la rue	
2003	A Minute of Sun Less	Une minute de soleil en moins	TV Film
2007	Whatever Lola Wants		English-language debut
2012	Horses of God	يا خيل الله	
2015	Much Loved	الزين اللي فيك	
2017	Razzia	غزية	
2021	Casablanca Beats	علي صوتك	
2024	Everybody Loves Touda	في حب تودا	

=== Only writer ===
- Whatever Lola Wants (2007) co-written with Jane Hawksley
- The Blue Caftan (2023) co-written with Maryam Touzani

=== As producer ===
- 2000: Ali Zaoua: Prince of the Streets (associate producer)
- 2006: Tiwarga (TV Movie)
- 2006: Heart Edges
- 2008: Houti Houta (TV Movie)
- 2010: L'Equipe (The Team) (TV Series)
- 2010: Al ferka (TV Series)
- 2010: 3ichk al baroud 2010 (TV Movie)
- 2010: Mirages
- 2011: My Land (Documentary)
- 2011: Zinat Al Hayat (TV Series) (executive producer)
- 2012: Quand ils dorment (Short)
- 2012: Horses of God
- 2013: Une bonne leçon (TV Movie) (line producer: Morocco)
- 2013: C'est eux les chiens...
- 2015: Much Loved
- 2015: Aji-Bi (Documentary)
- 2015: All Three of Us (line producer: Morocco)
- 2015: Aya Goes to the Beach (Short)
- 2017: Pluie de sueur
- 2017: Zwaj El Waqt (TV Movie documentary)
- 2019: Wadrari (Documentary)
- 2019: Adam
- 2023: The Blue Caftan

== Decorations ==
- Chevalier of the Order of Arts and Letters (2015)
