= Amazonian Jews =

Ethno-religious group in South America

Total population
- about 25,000

Regions with significant populations
- Brazil: 24,000
- Israel: 550
- Peru: 50

Languages
- Modern: Portuguese (Brazil), Spanish (Peru), Hebrew (Israel and liturgical); Traditional: Haketia

Religion
- Judaism

Related ethnic groups
- Moroccan Jews, Sephardic Jews, Maghrebi Jews, Berber Jews, Brazilians, Peruvians, caboclos, mestizos

Amazonian Jews (Portuguese: judeus da Amazônia; Spanish: judíos de la Amazonia; Hebrew: יהודי האמזונס, romanized: yehudei haAmazonas; Ladino: ג׳ודיוס די אמאזוניה, djudios de Amazonia) are the Jews of the Amazon basin, mainly descendants of Moroccan Jews who migrated to northern Brazil and Peru in the 19th and early 20th centuries. The migrants were attracted to the growing trade in the Amazon region, especially during the rubber boom, as well as to the newly established religious tolerance. They settled in localities along the Amazon River, such as Belém, Cametá, Santarém, Óbidos, Parintins, Itacoatiara and Manaus in Brazil, some venturing as far as Iquitos in Peru.

During the 20th century, the Jews of the region became concentrated in its urban areas, and some moved to other Brazilian cities such as Rio de Janeiro and São Paulo, joining other Jewish communities there. In the 21st century, in northern Brazil there were significant Jewish communities in Belém and Manaus, active with various institutions, as well as smaller communities in Macapá and Porto Velho. Of the approximately 120,000 Jews in the whole country, about 20% were estimated to be of Moroccan origin, mostly descendants of migrants to the Amazon basin.

In parallel to the established Jewish communities, many of the original migrants dispersed and married into the local population. As a result, a significant portion of the general population of the Amazon region has partial Moroccan Jewish ancestry. Despite not being considered Jews under religious law, which requires Jewish matrilineal descent or conversion to Judaism, many of these descendants cherish their Jewish ancestry and some keep Jewish practices to various degrees. In Iquitos, most of them formally converted to Judaism and moved to Israel under its Law of Return.

== History ==
Historical Jewish communities in Morocco

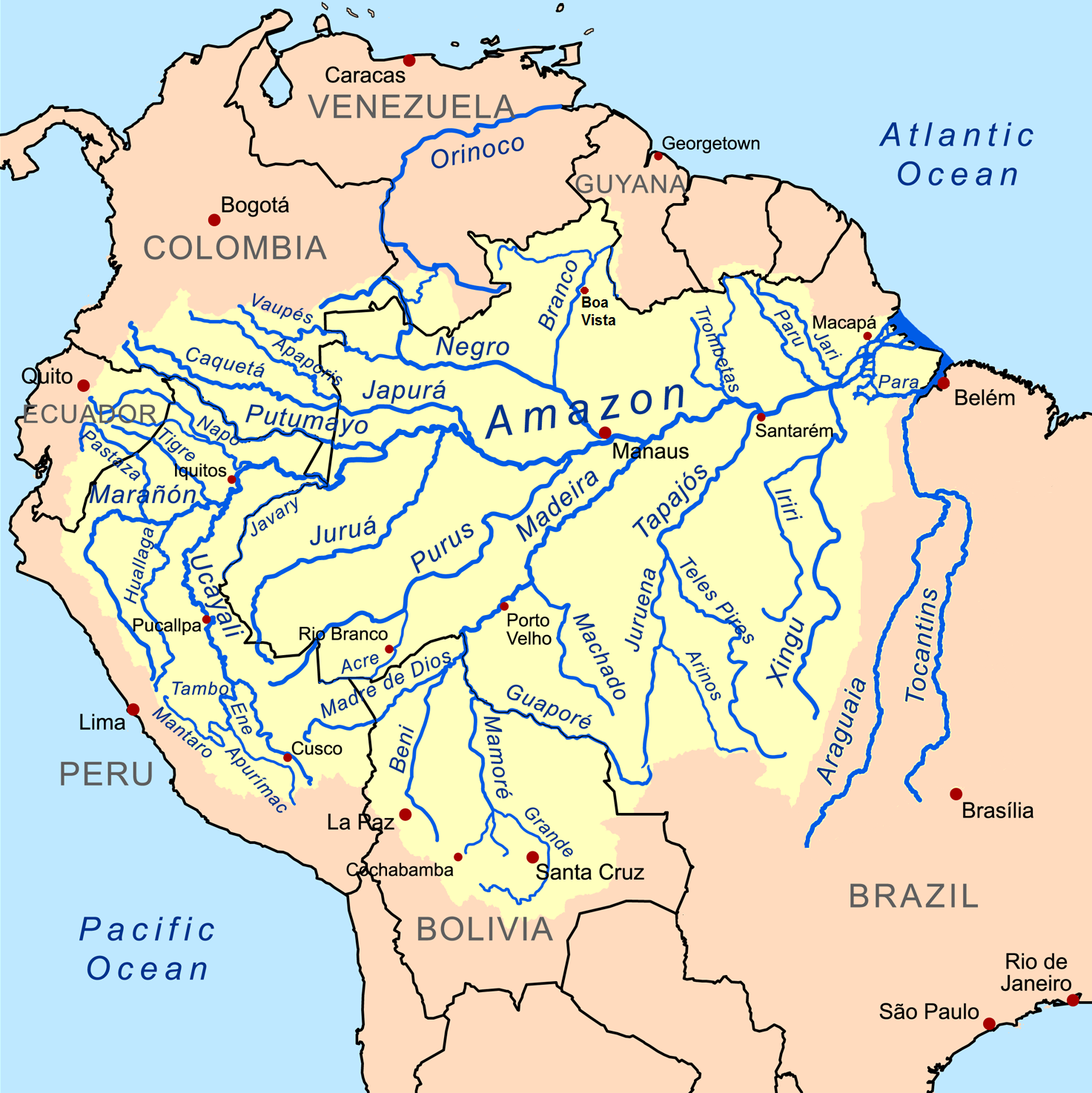
Amazon River basin

In 1808, the Portuguese Empire allowed foreigners to trade and reside in its colony of Brazil, along with tolerance for the private practice of religions other than Catholicism, followed by the official termination of the Portuguese Inquisition in 1821 and the independence of Brazil in 1822. Attracted by the favorable economic and social conditions, Moroccan Jews started migrating to Brazil in 1810. They included two groups:

- Megorashim, meaning "expelled": Sephardic Jews, descendants of Jews expelled from Spain and Portugal in the late 15th century, speaking Spanish, Portuguese and Haketia, mostly from the Moroccan cities of Tangier, Tétouan and Casablanca, as well as the Spanish city of Ceuta and the British territory of Gibraltar;
- Toshavim, meaning "residents": Maghrebi and Berber Jews, descendants of Jews who lived in Morocco before the arrival of Sephardic Jews, speaking Arabic and Berber, mostly from the Moroccan cities of Rabat, Fez and Marrakesh.

The Megorashim ironically called the Toshavim forasteros (foreigners). The rivalry that existed between the two groups in Morocco continued in Brazil: the Toshavim founded a modest synagogue, Eshel Abraham (Abraham's Tamarisk), in 1824, and the Megorashim founded a richer synagogue, Shaar Hashamaim (Gate of Heaven), in 1826, both in Belém, at the mouth of the Amazon River. They also built a Jewish cemetery in the city in 1842. Jews of other origins also migrated to the Amazon region in smaller numbers, such as French Jews from Alsace–Lorraine, Ashkenazi Jews from Central and Eastern Europe, and other Sephardic and Mizrahi Jews from the Middle East.

The initial migrants were mostly young men. After achieving a certain prosperity, they often returned to their native land to visit their families, marry Jewish women, and bring them back to Brazil. Their prosperity and their continued contact with the original communities stimulated new migrants, who would have the financial and social support of their acquaintances in Brazil. Later migrants were able to marry those from Jewish families who had previously come with their parents or who were already born in Brazil, thus maintaining their religious traditions with their descendants in the new communities.

The migrants worked mostly as merchants, selling food, beverages, medications, fabrics and ammunition to the local population, from whom they bought items produced from local plants and animals, such as rubber, balsam, fruits, nuts, hides and leather, to export to other countries. Traveling along the Amazon River, many settled in smaller localities beyond the city of Belém, such as Cametá, Macapá, Santarém, Óbidos, Parintins, Itacoatiara, and the city of Manaus. Some ventured as far as Iquitos in Peru, or through tributary rivers to localities such as Porto Velho and Rio Branco.

In 1862, the Alliance Israélite Universelle began to establish Jewish schools in Morocco and throughout the Mediterranean and Middle East. These schools were crucial in improving the education of Moroccan Jews and prepared them for their future professions and business activities. Some migrants in Brazil also sent their children to Morocco to study in these schools.

Many Moroccan Jews became naturalized citizens of Brazil. Some returned to Morocco permanently but retained their Brazilian citizenship, enjoying its consular protection there.

=== Rubber boom ===
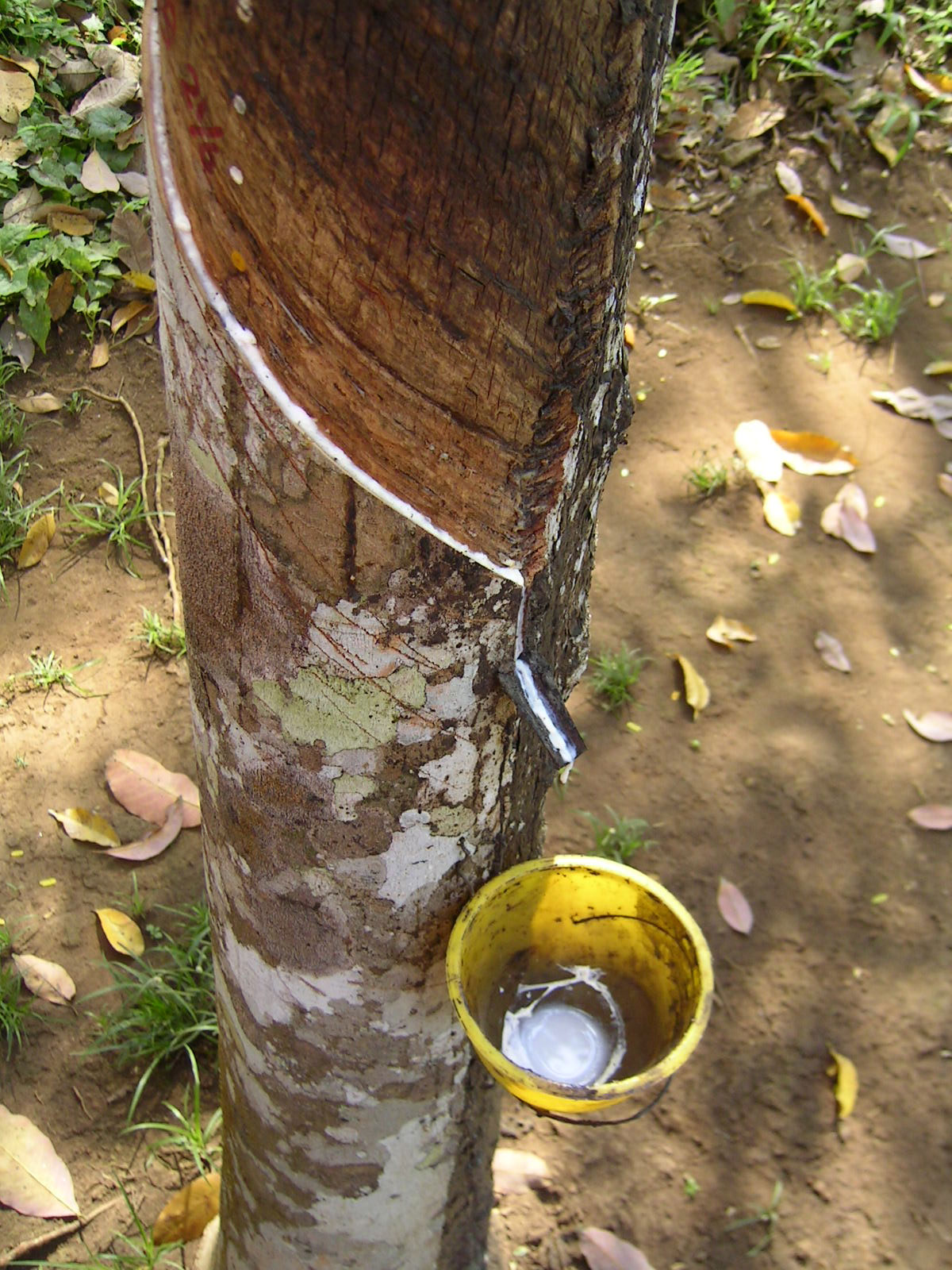
Extraction of latex from a rubber tree

Natural rubber is produced from latex of the rubber tree, which at the time was found exclusively in the Amazon region. Around 1880, rubber became a highly demanded commodity for the production of automobile tires and other industrial processes, causing a rubber boom in the region, leading to significant economic prosperity and attracting migrants from many regions.

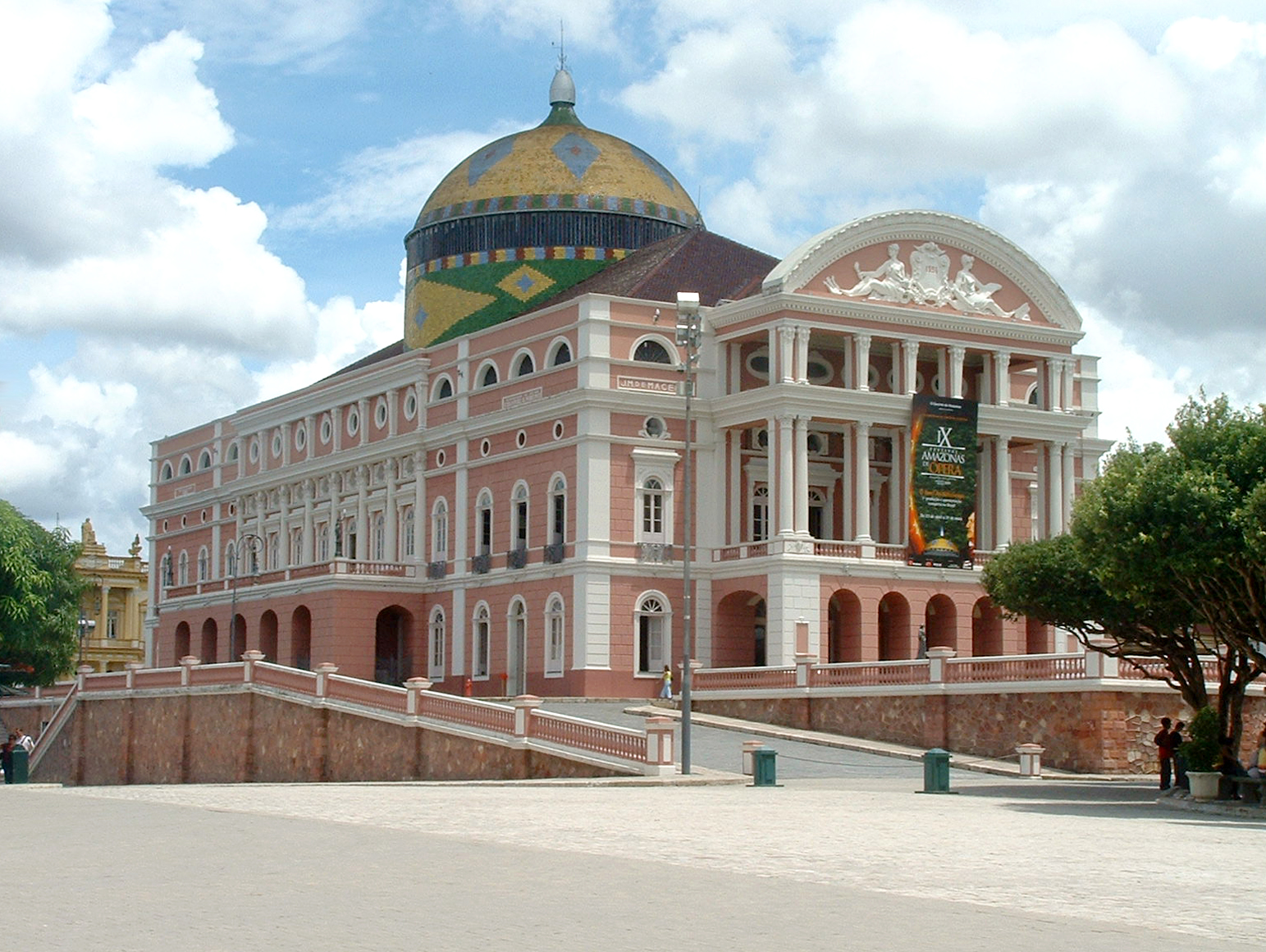
Amazon Theatre in Manaus, one of the luxurious buildings built with rubber fortunes

In 1889, Brazil became a republic, and in 1890, the country allowed full freedom of religion, not only restricted to private spaces as before. The rubber boom continued under the new regime and led to the rapid development of the cities of Belém, Manaus and Iquitos, including running water and sewers, electricity (a novelty at the time), wealthy residences, luxurious buildings, theaters, and railroads. This period marked the height of Jewish migration to the Amazon basin.

=== Decline ===
Around 1910, the rubber boom started to decline due to competition with the British colonies of Ceylon and Malaya and the Dutch East Indies, which began to grow rubber trees from seeds smuggled from Brazil by British explorer Henry Wickham. The decline later intensified due to the production of synthetic rubber.

With the economic decline, Jews left the smaller localities in northern Brazil, concentrating in the cities of Belém and Manaus. They built two synagogues in Manaus: Beit Yaacov (House of Jacob) by the Toshavim in 1928, and Rabi Meyr by the Megorashim in 1929. In 1962, reflecting the continuing decline of the community and the obsolete distinction between the two groups, they were merged as the Beit Yaacov/Rabi Meyr Synagogue.

Many Jews also left the Amazon region altogether, moving to other Brazilian cities such as Rio de Janeiro and São Paulo, joining the existing Jewish communities there. Most Jews of Iquitos also moved to larger cities in Brazil or to Lima.

=== Rabbi Shalom Emanuel Muyal ===
In 1908, Chief Rabbi of Morocco Raphael Ankawa sent Rabbi Shalom Emanuel Muyal to provide religious orientation to the Jewish communities in the Amazon basin. Although unknown in Belém, Rabbi Muyal visited the Jewish communities in many smaller localities in the region, as well as Manaus and Iquitos. During his stay, he became gravely ill, probably from yellow fever based on the reported symptoms, and died in Manaus in 1910. As there was no Jewish cemetery in the city at the time, he was buried in a Catholic cemetery, with a wall around his grave. The local Catholics started to revere the rabbi as a saint, making pilgrimages to his grave and placing commemorative plaques giving thanks for miraculous cures. Around 1980, Ely Muyal, a nephew of Rabbi Muyal and a member of the Israeli government, suggested the transfer of his grave to Israel. The Jewish community of Manaus warned against the move, as it refrained from transferring the rabbi's grave even to the city's Jewish cemetery to avoid upsetting the local population. The Jewish community continued to guard the graves of Jews who were buried in the Catholic cemetery before the Jewish one was built, but maintained the rabbi's grave open to visitation, and held an annual ceremony in his honor.

== Present communities ==
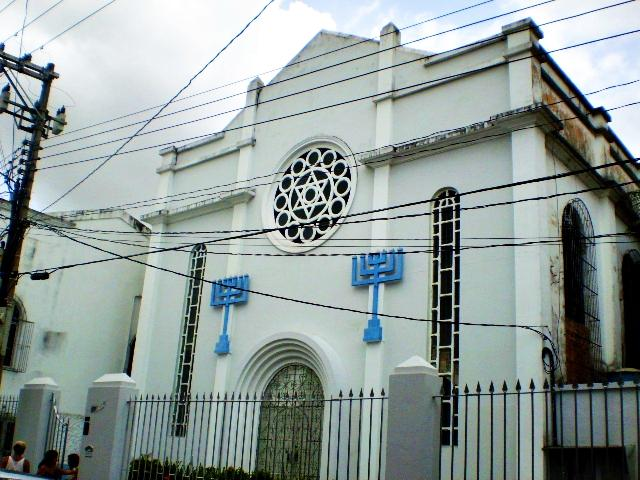
Eshel Abraham Synagogue in Belém

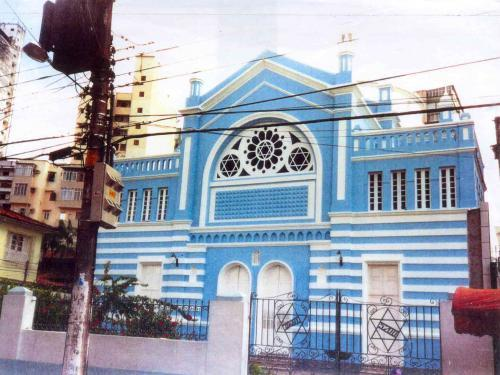
Shaar Hashamaim Synagogue in Belém

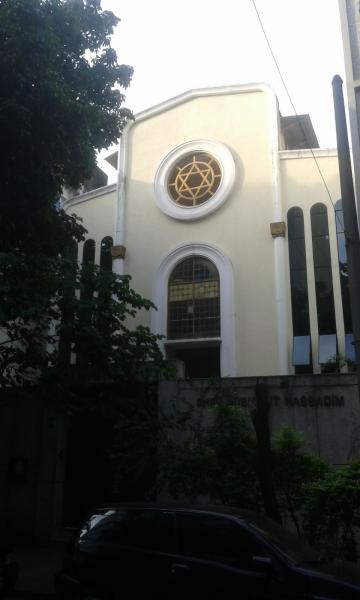
Synagogue Shel Guemilut Hassadim in Rio de Janeiro, maintained largely by descendants of Moroccan Jews from the Amazon region

The 2010 Brazilian Census counted 1,346 Jews in Belém, 1,183 in Manaus, and 1,896 in the rest of the North Region of the country. The Jewish communities of Belém and Manaus maintained synagogues, schools, recreation centers, and social groups for women, children and seniors. There were also synagogues in Macapá and Porto Velho.

A Sephardic synagogue in Rio de Janeiro was also maintained largely by descendants of Moroccan Jews who left the Amazon region, becoming part of the larger Jewish community of the city. In 2014, it was estimated that 20% of the approximately 120,000 Jews in Brazil were of Moroccan origin, mostly descendants of migrants to the Amazon region. About 300 of them lived in Israel.

=== Mixed descendants ===
Many of the original migrants remained in smaller localities of the Amazon basin and married into the local population, mostly of Amerindian origin. Very few of their spouses or children converted to Judaism, while the vast majority of their caboclo or mestizo descendants gradually abandoned the religion or were raised as Catholics, but some kept certain Jewish practices to various degrees. In 1999, it was estimated that about 300,000 people in northern Brazil had a Moroccan Jewish ancestor.

In the late 20th century, a group of mixed descendants in Iquitos began to explore their Jewish heritage. As they lacked Jewish matrilineal descent, a formal conversion would be required for them to be recognized as Jews under religious law. After years of study, with the help of Conservative rabbis from Lima, the United States, Argentina and Chile, 98 of the descendants converted to Judaism in 2003, followed by about 180 in 2005, and 284 in 2011. The ritual immersion took place in nearby Lake Quistococha in all occasions. Most of them emigrated to Israel, between 2010 and 2014, settling in Beersheba and Ramla. In 2017, about 50 remained in Iquitos.

In 2022, in the northern Brazilian municipality of Cametá, a group of 800 self-declared Jews, mostly descendants of Moroccan Jews, sought to reestablish a synagogue there. An old synagogue of Portuguese colonial architecture had been overtaken by the Tocantins River after most of the Jews left in the 20th century. The group received the support of Sephardic congregations in the United States.

== Languages ==
Among the original Jewish migrants, the Megorashim spoke Spanish, Portuguese and Haketia, also known as Western Ladino, a language mostly based on Old Spanish with Hebrew and Arabic influences; the Toshavim spoke Arabic and Berber; and smaller groups spoke French, German, Yiddish, Eastern Ladino and Arabic.

Over time, their descendants adopted the main languages of their respective countries, namely Portuguese in Brazil and Spanish in Peru. Although Haketia is no longer spoken as a full language, many families still use words or expressions from it when speaking among themselves, to convey emotions such as affection, impatience, humor, irony, or for insults, secrecy, proverbs, religious expressions, and songs. A few community members also devoted time to study and document the language.

Hebrew remained the liturgical language. It is also learned to various degrees by members of the communities in Brazil and Peru, as well as by those who emigrated to Israel.

== Documentaries ==
- Where is the Rabbi? (2000), by Stephen Nugent and Renato Athias, showing the life of Jews in the Amazon basin.
- Eretz Amazônia (Land of Amazon), produced in 2004 by David Salgado, based on Samuel Benchimol's homonymous book published in 1998, about Jews in northern Brazil.
- The Fire Within: Jews in the Amazonian Rainforest (2008), by Lorry Salcedo Mitrani, about the Peruvian-Jewish descendants in Iquitos and their efforts to revive Judaism and emigrate to Israel.

== Notable people ==
- Jayme Aben-Athar (1883–1951), Brazilian physician and professor
- Davi Alcolumbre (born 1977), Federal Deputy (2003–2015) and Senator (from 2015) for Amapá, and President of the Senate (2019–2021 and from 2025)
- David Azulay (1953–2009), Brazilian fashion designer
- Samuel Benchimol (1923–2002), Brazilian businessman, economist and professor
- Saul Benchimol (1934–2022), Brazilian businessman and professor
- Isaac Bennesby (1945–2011), Mayor of Guajará-Mirim (1983–1988, 1993–1996)
- Moisés Bennesby (born 1935), Federal Deputy for Rondônia (1988–1989, 1996–1999)
- Sara Benoliel (1898–1970), Brazilian-Portuguese pediatrician and feminist
- Abraham Bentes (1912–1990), Brazilian Army general and linguist
- Isaac Jacob Benzecry (1908–1991), Brazilian industrialist and entrepreneur
- Eliezer Moisés Levy (1877–1947), Mayor of Macapá (1932–1936, 1942–1944) and Afuá
- Judah Levy (1916–2001), Brazilian engineer
- Sultana Levy Rosenblatt (1910–2007), Brazilian writer
- Abraham Medina (1916–1995), Brazilian businessman
- Shalom Emanuel Muyal (1875–1910), Moroccan rabbi
- Eduardo Pazuello (born 1963), Brazilian Army general, Minister of Health (2020–2021) and Federal Deputy for Rio de Janeiro (from 2023)
- David José Pérez (1883–1970), Brazilian linguist, professor and journalist
- Isaac José Pérez (1876–1945), Mayor of Itacoatiara (1926–1930)
- Clara Pinto (born 1946), Brazilian dancer and businesswoman
- Isaac Benayon Sabbá (1907–1996), Brazilian businessman
- Nora Pazuello Sabbá (born 1940), Miss Amazonas (1959)
- Isaac Soares (c. 1924–2008), Brazilian journalist and Vice Mayor of Belém (1961–1964)
- Ana Unger (born c. 1963), Brazilian dancer and businesswoman

=== Descendants ===
- Christian Bendayán (born 1973), Peruvian painter
- Gilberto Dimenstein (1956–2020), Brazilian journalist
- Roberta Medina (born 1978), Brazilian-Portuguese businesswoman
- Roberto Medina (born 1947), Brazilian businessman
- Rubem Medina (born 1942), Brazilian businessman and Federal Deputy for Guanabara (1967–1975) and Rio de Janeiro (1975–2003)
- José Isaac Peres (born 1940), Brazilian businessman

== See also ==
- History of the Jews in Brazil
- History of the Jews in Peru
- Moroccan Jews
- Sephardic Jews
- B'nai Moshe
- Beit Yaacov/Rabi Meyr Synagogue
- Indigenous peoples in Brazil
- Indigenous peoples of Peru
- Indigenous peoples of South America
