= Beit Yaacov/Rabi Meyr Synagogue =

Synagogue in Brazil

- Portuguese: Sinagoga Beth Jacob/Rebi Meyr
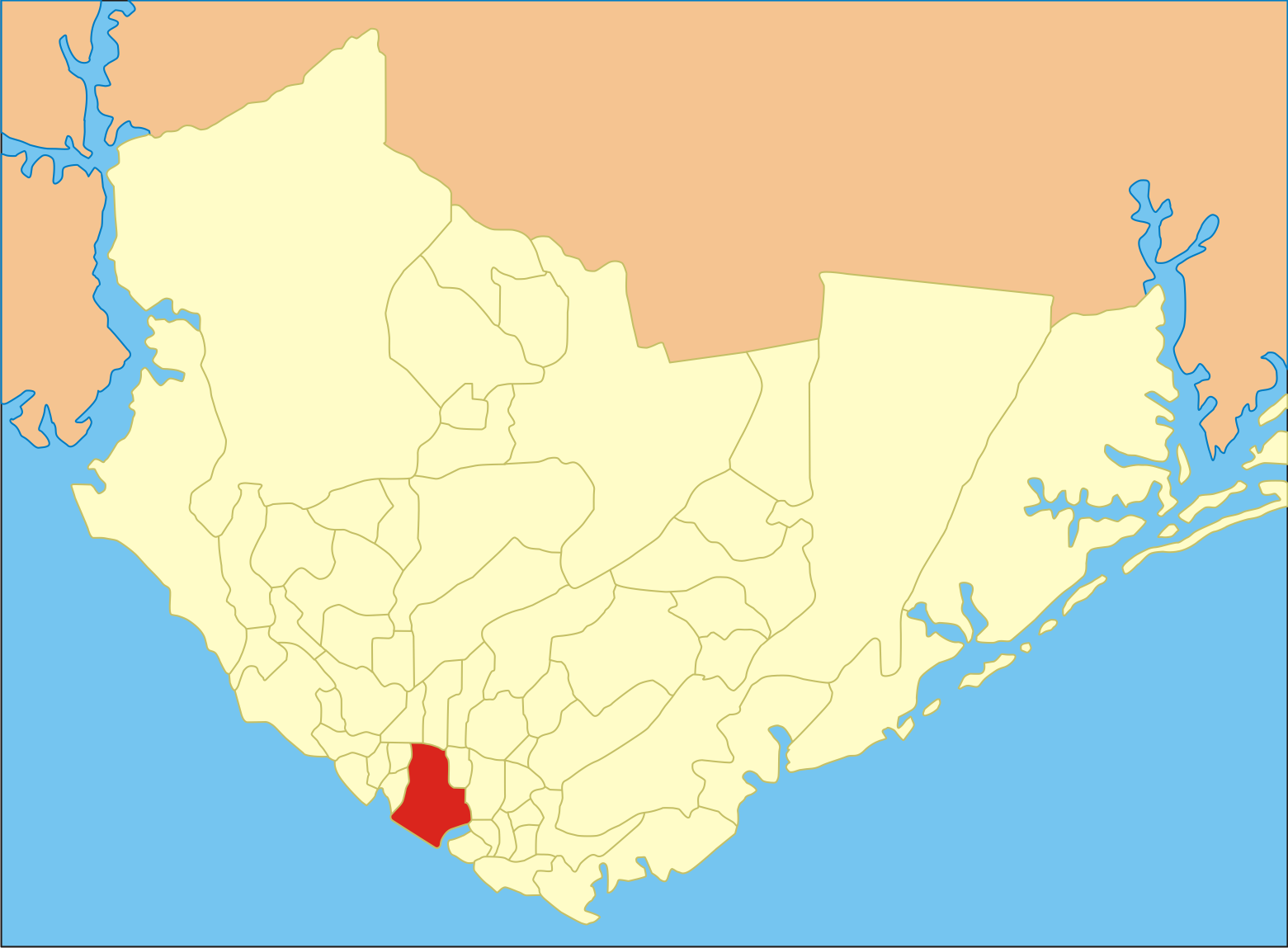

- Location of the synagogue in Brazil

Religion
- Affiliation: Judaism
- Rite: Sefardi; Spanish-Moroccan
- Ecclesiastical or organisational status: Synagogue
- Status: Active

Location
- Location: 630 Avenida Leonardo Malcher, Manaus, Amazonas
- Country: Brazil
- Coordinates: 3°07′34″S 60°01′33″W

Architecture
- Architect: Judah Eliezer Levy
- Established: June 15, 1929 (Jewish Committee of Amazonas); 1937 (Rabi Meyr congregation)
- Completed: 1962 (current synagogue)

Website
- comiteisraelita.com.br (in Portuguese)

The Beit Yaacov/Rabi Meyr Synagogue (Portuguese: Sinagoga Beit Yaacov/Rabi Meyr) is a Traditional Jewish congregation and synagogue, in Manaus, Amazonas, Brazil. The congregation is a merger of two earlier congregations that have origins from the 1920s. It is one of the largest and most influential congregations of Amazonian Jews in northern Brazil. The current synagogue was completed in 1962.

== History and congregational life ==
=== Jewish presence in Colonial Brazil ===
Jewish presence in Brazil dates back to the colonial era, when Portuguese expansion brought both practicing Jews and Cristãos-Novos to the Americas. Many Jews concealed their religious identity to evade persecution by the Inquisition, which actively monitored religious conformity in Portuguese territories. Periods of relative tolerance were rare but notable, particularly during the Dutch occupation of northeastern Brazil in the seventeenth century, when New Holland was established and religious pluralism was temporarily permitted.

Following the Portuguese reconquest in the mid-1600s, Jews were once again expelled. Some members of these displaced communities are believed to have migrated northward, contributing to early Jewish settlement in what would later become the United States, including New Amsterdam (present-day New York City).

=== Religious tolerance and the legal framework of the nineteenth century ===
A decisive transformation occurred in the early nineteenth century as a result of the Napoleonic Wars. Threatened by Napoleon's invasion, Portugal sought British protection, formalized through treaties signed in 1810. These agreements granted limited religious freedom to non-Catholics throughout Portuguese dominions, including Brazil. Although initially designed to protect Anglican merchants and residents, the treaties had broader implications for religious minorities.

Brazil's independence in 1822 further solidified this trajectory. The Constitution of 1824 recognized freedom of religion, albeit under restrictive conditions, allowing non-Catholic worship in private spaces without external religious symbols. Despite its limitations, this constitutional guarantee represented a significant departure from earlier colonial practices. The principle of religious tolerance persisted throughout the imperial period and expanded substantially after the proclamation of the Republic in 1889 and the formal separation of church and state in 1890.

Together with economic incentives, this legal framework positioned Brazil as one of the principal immigrant destinations of the nineteenth and early twentieth centuries, alongside the United States, Canada, and Argentina.

=== Moroccan jewish migration to Brazil ===
Against this backdrop, Moroccan Jews began to view Brazil as a viable alternative to the legal insecurity and economic limitations they faced in North Africa. Jewish communities had existed in Morocco for centuries and expanded after the expulsion of Jews from the Iberian Peninsula in the late fifteenth century. While culturally rich, Moroccan Jewish life was deeply shaped by political instability. Conditions varied depending on the reigning sultan, ranging from periods of relative coexistence to episodes of segregation in mellahs and outbreaks of antisemitic violence, including the execution of Sol Hachuel in the early nineteenth century.

Linguistic diversity, Arabic, French, and Spanish, and geographic proximity facilitated transatlantic mobility. The similarities between Portuguese and Spanish further eased migration. Beginning in the early nineteenth century, young Moroccan Jewish men migrated to Brazil, particularly to the Amazon region. This movement echoed earlier population transfers, such as the relocation of Portuguese settlers from Mazagan (present-day El Jadida) to the Amazon in 1769.

=== The rubber boom and jewish economic life in the amazon ===
The consolidation of Moroccan Jewish communities in the Amazon coincided with the Rubber Boom, a period of rapid economic expansion driven by global demand for natural rubber. From the mid-nineteenth century through the early twentieth century, the region attracted migrants from across the world. Moroccan Jews established commercial networks that extended from major urban centers such as Belém and Manaus into the riverine hinterland.

Jewish traders navigated the Amazon River and its tributaries, selling goods, facilitating transport, and connecting rubber plantations to export ports supplying European and North American markets. Their economic activities positioned them as intermediaries between local producers and global trade networks, embedding Jewish life deeply within the region's economic infrastructure.

=== Communal institutions and the case of manaus ===
Moroccan Jews organized religious and communal institutions shortly after their arrival. In Belém, two synagogues and a cemetery were established in the 1820s, marking the oldest continuously functioning Jewish institutions in Brazil. In Rio de Janeiro, the União Israelita Shel Guemilut Hassadim was founded in 1873.

Manaus presents a distinct case. Initially an insignificant settlement, the city rapidly transformed into a cosmopolitan center during the Rubber Boom. Unlike Belém, Manaus first attracted Alsatian Jews following the Franco-Prussian War of 1870–1871. Seeking to avoid German rule, these migrants settled in the Amazon, where they remained throughout the rubber economy's peak.

Despite their prominence in commerce, early Jewish residents of Manaus did not immediately establish formal communal structures. It was only after the post–World War I collapse of the rubber economy, when Moroccan Jews relocated from the hinterland to urban centers, that institutional life consolidated. A synagogue was inaugurated in 1925, followed by a cemetery in 1928 and the incorporation of a Jewish Federation in 1929.

Subsequent decades saw the expansion and consolidation of communal life, including the unification of synagogues in 1962, the establishment of a Hebrew school in 1973, and the creation of a community center in 1976. In 2012, the inauguration of a mikveh marked another milestone in the community's religious infrastructure.

=== Contemporary developments ===
The creation of the Free Economic Zone of Manaus in 1967 renewed economic growth and attracted Ashkenazi Jews from other parts of Brazil, including descendants of European refugees from Nazi persecution. In 2010, Beit Chabad established a local presence. Today, the Jewish population of Manaus is estimated at 800 individuals.

The Jewish Labour Zionist youth movement Habonim Dror was established in Manaus and it is part of the community, and it operated for many years, until it was cancelled. More recently, the Habonim Dror was replaced by the Revisionist Zionist movement Betar as the community's youth movement, remaining active since early 2025, sparking an increased interest in Judaism and Zionism among the community's youth.

The local synagogue is locally referred to as 'esnoga,' derived from the Ladino term for synagogue which is derived from the Hebrew words for fire (אש) and brightness (נוגה).

== Service times ==
The Beit Yaacov/Rabi Meyr Synagogue conducts weekly Friday night and Saturday morning, Shabat services. Services are generally at 6:30 p.m. on Friday evening and 9:00 a.m. on Saturday morning. The synagogue also offers services throughout each holiday including Rosh Hashanah, Yom Kippur and Pessach.

The community also celebrates Yom Ha'Atzmaut, Yom HaShoah, Yom Hazikaron, Yom Yerushalayim, Mimouna and the Hilulot, celebrations linked to the commemoration of great rabbis and tzadikim of Morocco.

For security reasons, Jewish tourists and groups of Jewish tourists (with or without a guide) wishing to participate in the religious services of the synagogue must inform the community in advance.

== ”The Jewish Saint” ==
In 1908, following instructions from then Chief Rabbi of Morocco, Rephael Ancáua, Rabbi Shalom Imanuel Muyal traveled to the Amazon to verify the situation of hundreds of families of Moroccan Jews who started emigrating in 1810. In 1910, Rabbi Shalom Imanuel Muyal died of yellow fever and is buried in the Manaus Catholic Cemetery. He has come to be regarded as a saint by many in the local non-Jewish population, who make regular pilgrimages to his gravesite. Local Christians in the Amazonian city have made it a tradition to turn up at Muyal's burial spot in the Saint John the Baptist Cemetery to pray for miracles. When their prayers are answered, they put up small signs of thanks.

== See also ==
- History of the Jews in Brazil
- List of synagogues in Brazil
