= Moroccan Jews =

Jewish ethnic group

Moroccan Jews יהדות מרוקו (Hebrew) اليهود المغاربة (Arabic)
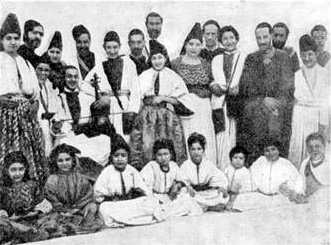
- Jews of Fes c. 1900

Total population
- 1.2 million

Regions with significant populations
- Israel: ~1 million (Note: 900,000 according to BBC Arabic in 2004. The World Federation of Moroccan Jewry estimated close to 1 million as of 2019.); 472,800 (born in Morocco or with a Moroccan-born father) (Note: As of 2010.)
- France: ~55,000
- Canada: ~27,000
- United States: ~25,000
- Spain: ~11,600
- Venezuela: ~6,000
- Brazil: ~6,000
- Morocco: 2,000
- Gibraltar: 700
- United Kingdom: ~550
- Argentina: 500

Languages
- Hebrew, Judeo-Moroccan Arabic, Moroccan Arabic, Haketia, Judeo-Berber, French, Spanish.

Religion
- Judaism

Related ethnic groups
- Moroccans, Spaniards, Maghrebi Jews, Sephardic Jews

Moroccan Jews (Arabic: اليهود المغاربة, romanized: al-Yahūd al-Maghāriba; Hebrew: יהודים מרוקאים, romanized: Yehudim Maroka'im; Ladino: Djudios de Maroko) are Jews who live in or are from Morocco. Moroccan Jews constitute an ancient community dating to Roman times. Jews began immigrating to the region as early as 70 CE. They were much later met by a second wave of migrants from the Iberian Peninsula in the period which immediately preceded and followed the issuing of the 1492 Alhambra Decree, when Jews were expelled from Spain, and soon afterwards, from Portugal. This second wave of immigrants changed Moroccan Jewry, which largely embraced the Andalusian Sephardic liturgy, to switch to a mostly Sephardic identity.

Moroccan Jews built the first Jewish neighborhood outside the walls of Jerusalem (Mahane Israel) in 1867, as well as the first modern neighborhoods in Tel Aviv, Haifa and Tiberias. Following the spread of Zionism in Morocco beginning in the early 20th century and the establishment of the State of Israel in 1948, there was a significant migration of Moroccan Jews to Palestine, especially through the Israeli initiatives Cadima (1949–1956) and Operation Yachin (1961–1964).

During the 1950s, Morocco's Jewish population was about 250,000–350,000. Due to Jewish-Moroccan emigration during the 1960s-1970s, the country’s Jewish population reduced to approximately 2,500. The vast majority of Moroccan Jews now live in Israel, where they constitute the second-largest Jewish community. Other communities are found in France, Canada, Spain, the United States, and throughout South America (mainly in Venezuela, Brazil, and Argentina).

The affection and respect between Moroccan Jews and the Kingdom of Morocco remains palpable. Every year, rabbis and community leaders around the Moroccan Jewish diaspora are invited to attend the Throne Celebration held in Rabat. During the 2014 celebration, Rabbi Haim A. Moryoussef from Canada, dedicated his book "Le Bon Oeil - Ben Porath Yossef" to King Mohammed VI along with a handwritten blessing on parchment wishing him a healthy, long, and successful life.

== History ==
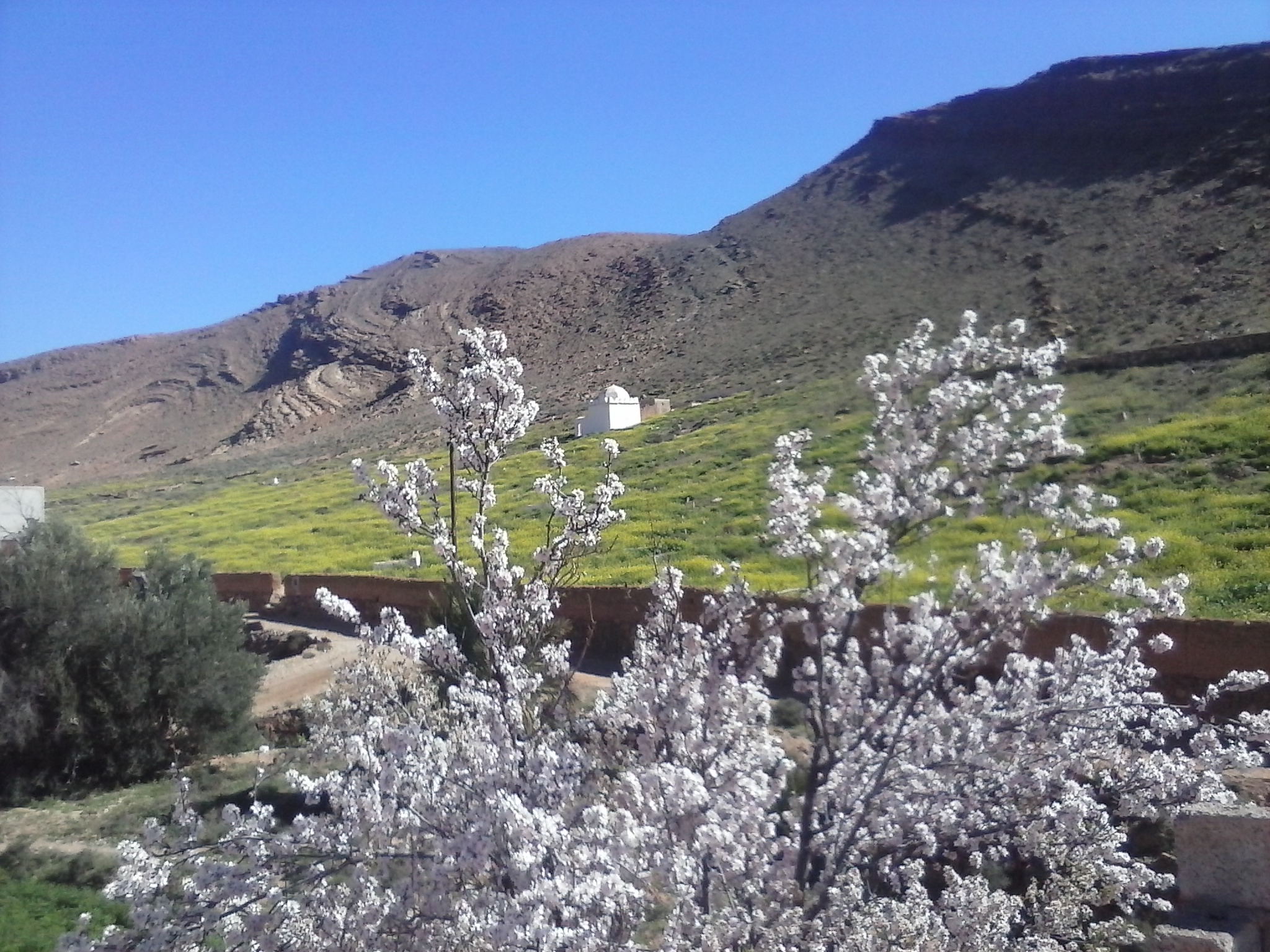
Ifrane Atlas-Saghir in the Anti-Atlas, known to Jews as Oufrane, is believed to be the oldest Jewish community in Morocco, speculatively dated to the year 361 BCE.

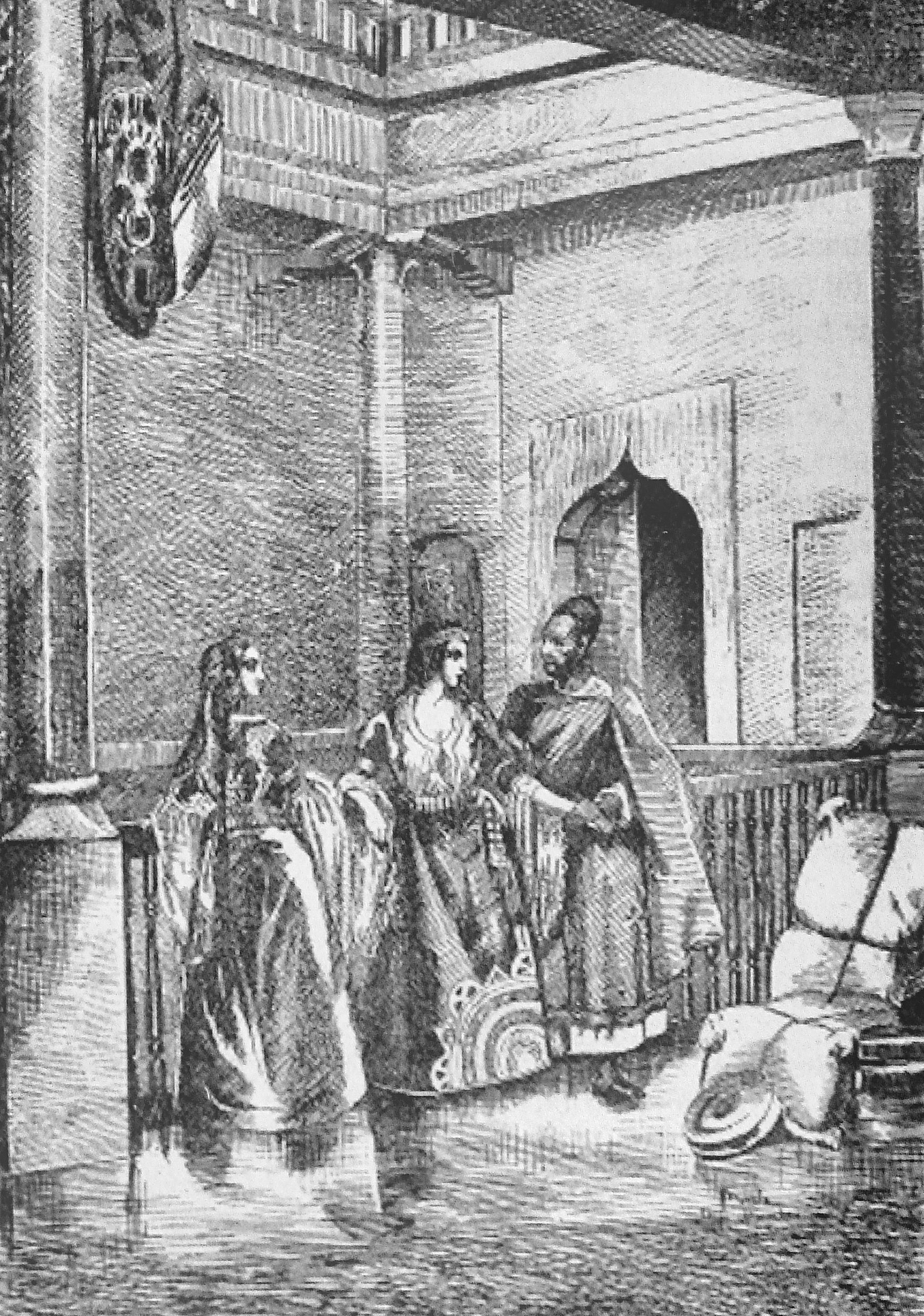
Etching of Jewish home in Mogador, Darondeau (1807–1841)

Moroccan Jews constitute an ancient community with possible origins dating to before 70 CE. Concrete evidence of the Jewish presence in Morocco becomes apparent in late antiquity, with Hebrew epitaphs and menorah-decorated lamps discovered in the Roman city of Volubilis, and the remains of a synagogue dating to the third century CE. In accordance with the norms of the Islamic legal system, Moroccan Jews had separate legal courts pertaining to "personal law" under which communities (Muslim sharia, Christian Canon law, and Jewish halakha law-abiding) were allowed to rule themselves under their own systems.

During the Late Middle Ages, and particularly after the expulsion of Jews mandated by the Alhambra Decree, countless Sephardic Jews migrated from al-Andalus to the northern Maghreb as refugees fleeing the inquisitions in Spain and Portugal, settling in Tétouan, Fez, Tangier, Marrakesh, Meknes, Rabat, Essaouria, Tlemcen, Oran, Constantine, Tunis, and elsewhere along the Mediterranean and Atlantic coasts of the region historically referred to as the Maghreb proper (i.e., Morocco, Algeria, and Tunisia). They are referred to as the Megorashim, while the Jews already in Morocco are referred to as the Toshavim. Many Sephardic Jews settled in Fez and Marrakesh. In the following centuries, Conversos who had been banished to Iberian colonial possessions in the Americas and the Atlantic reclaimed their Judaism and also resettled in Morocco.

In the mid 19th century, Moroccan Jews started migrating from the interior of the country to coastal cities such as Essaouira, Mazagan, Asfi, and later Casablanca for economic opportunity, participating in trade with Europeans and the development of those cities. The Alliance Israélite Universelle opened its first school in Tetuan in 1862.

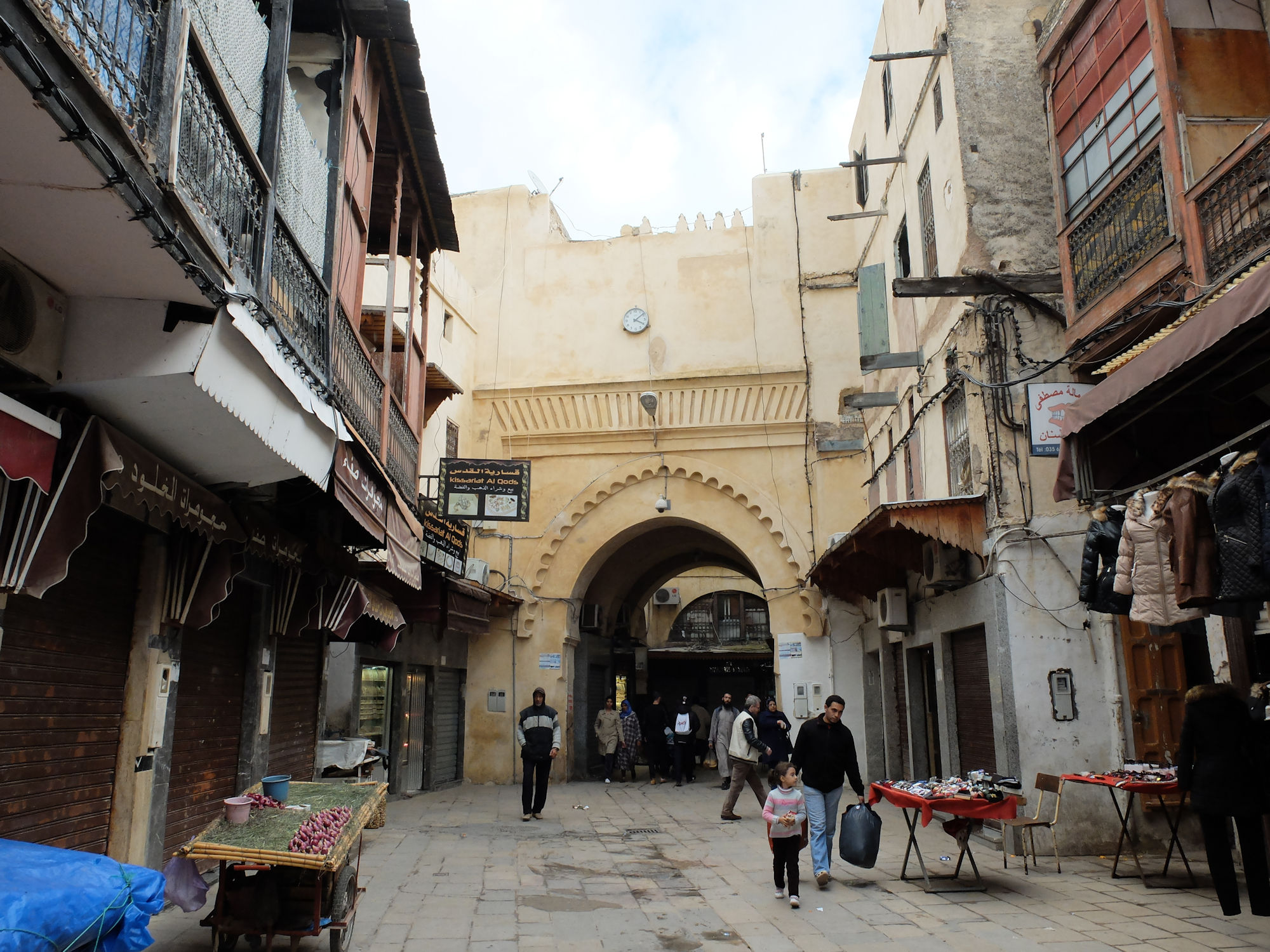
Balconies in the Mellah of Fes, an old Jewish neighborhood, distinguish the homes from homes of Muslims at the time.

After the establishment of the State of Israel in 1948, and due to domestic strife in the 1950s, the next several decades saw waves of Jewish emigration to Israel, France and Canada. Shay Hazkani found that of the 20,000 who performed aliyah in 1948-1949, 1,000 served in the IDF, of which 70 percent wished to return home to Morocco. Only six percent managed to do so, given such various bureaucratic obstacles as the Israelis’ confiscation of their passports. Moroccan Jews emigrated for a variety of reasons. Some have emigrated for religious reasons, some faced mistreatment, and others left for better economic prospects than they faced in post-protectorate Morocco. With every Arab-Israeli war, tensions between Arabs and Jews would rise, sparking more Jewish emigration. By the time of the Yom Kippur War in 1973, the majority of Morocco's Jewish population had emigrated.

As a protectorate of France (from 1912-1956), parts of Morocco were influenced by the French, while the same was true for northern Morocco while under Spain’s protectorate (also from 1912-1956). During the French and Spanish protectorates, Moroccan Jews and Moroccan Muslims were classified based upon which Moroccan regions they called home. Certain remnants of these classifications can be felt today. These differences are reflected in language, foods, last names and even liturgy. Early photographs of Moroccan Jewish families, taken in the early 20th century by German explorer and photographer Hermann Burchardt, are now held at the Ethnological Museum of Berlin.

During the late 1930s, many Jews in Morocco lived in desolate areas. This was in part due to increased taxation by French authorities. In 1936, Léon Blum, a Jewish man, was appointed as prime minister of France. This gave some Moroccan Jews hope that they may be able to become French citizens at some point, as Algerian Jews gained French citizenship with the Crémieux Decree. Algerian Jews were granted right of passage to France, and this then furthered the desire of many Moroccan Jews to embrace French culture to the extent of the Algerian Jews.

During the Moroccan struggle for independence in the 1950s, several promises were made to ensure equal rights for the Jewish community in a future independent Morocco, in part due to lobbying efforts of Moroccan nationalists in the United States.

Today, a small Jewish community of perhaps 2,500 live in Morocco (most of whom live in Casablanca). However, many young men emigrate to France and Israel. As of 2017, according to The Economist, "No Arab country has gone to the lengths of Morocco to revive its Jewish heritage." The country has restored 110 synagogues and has the Arab world's only Jewish museum, located in Casablanca. In October 2026, a new Museum of a Moroccan Jewish culture opened in Fes. More than 50,000 Moroccan Jews in Israel visit Morocco each year.

== Communities today ==
In the preamble to the 2011 Moroccan constitutional referendum following the Arab Spring, King Mohammed VI affirmed the status of the Jewish community of Morocco as a constitutive component of Moroccan national identity.

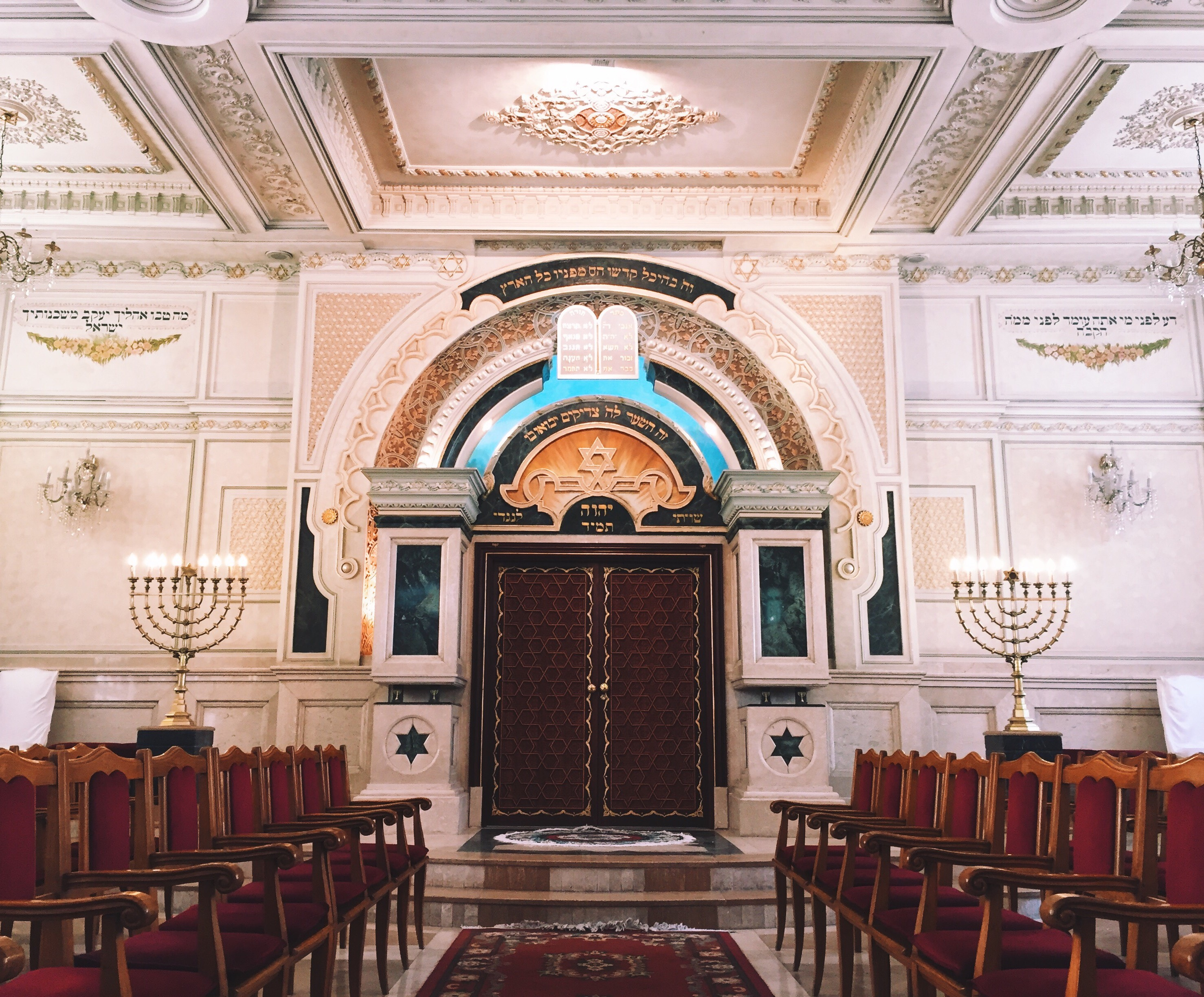
Beth-El Synagogue in Casablanca in 2017

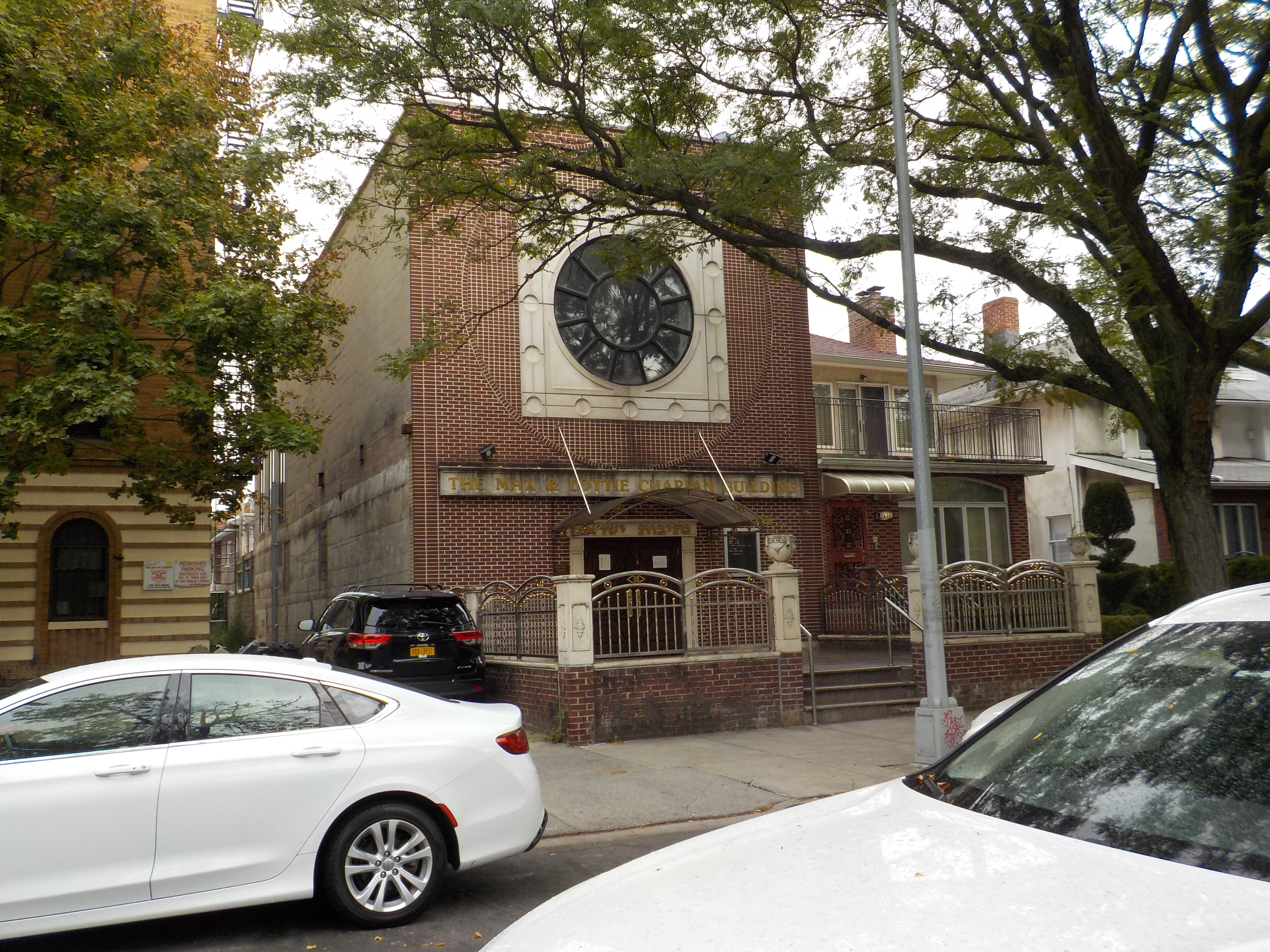
Netivot Yisrael congregation in Brooklyn.

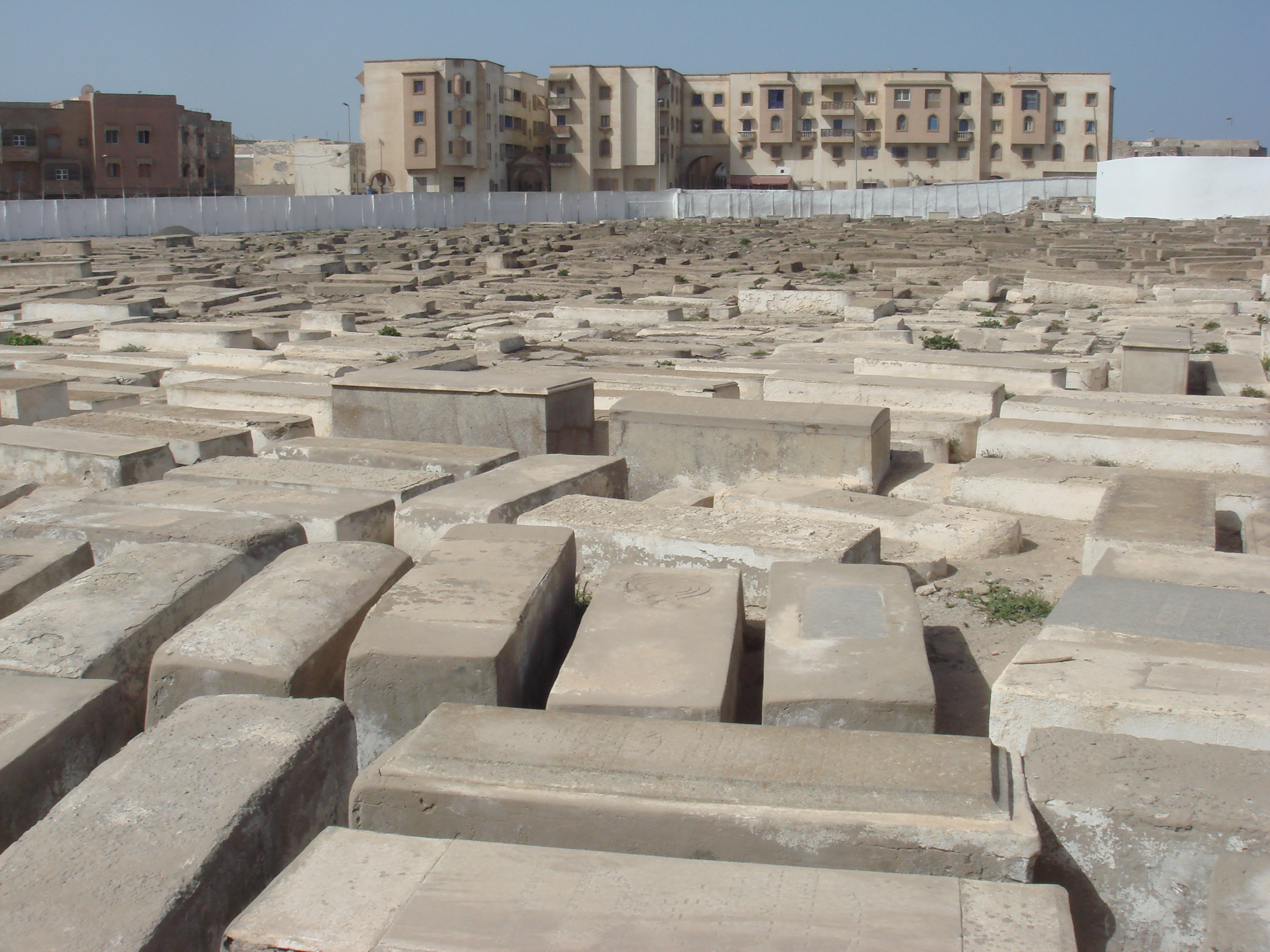
Jewish cemetery, Essaouira

- Morocco: As of 2024, about 2,100 Jews live in Morocco. As the only city that has retained a large Jewish population, Casablanca is now the center of Moroccan Jewish life. Smaller, aging populations remain in other cities, notably in Tangier.
- Israel: The 1960s and 1970s saw large waves of Jewish emigration from Morocco to Israel. Many Moroccan Jews were transferred to peripheral development towns while others settled in larger, established cities. Today, Moroccan Jews can be found throughout Israel.
- France: Large Moroccan Jewish communities in France include Paris, Marseille, Strasbourg, Lyon, and Nice.
- Argentina: Mainly in Buenos Aires and Rosario.
- Brazil: Amazonian Jews mainly in Belém (about 450 families), Manaus (about 250 families) and Rio de Janeiro (about 100 families), with small communities scattered throughout the Amazon region. 2009 marked 200 years since the first wave of immigration to the Amazon region. Prominent descendants of Moroccan Jews in Brazil include a Brazilian senator for the Amazonian province of Amapá, Davi Alcolumbre, who became President of the Senate in 2019, as well as Isaac Benayon Sabba and Samuel Benchimol.
- Canada: Canada began extending visas to Jews from Morocco in the 1950s. Large communities developed in Montreal and Toronto. Moroccans were attracted to Canada because of its high quality of life and to French-speaking Montreal, in particular, due to the language element. Toronto is known for its significant Moroccan population originating from such northern cities as Tangier and Tétouan. In the recent past, however, an emergence of French-Moroccan musical liturgy and customs has been noticed even in this dominant Moroccan city. For example, the traditional Moroccan Bakashot, classical music sung by Sephardic Jews in the winter months across countries in North Africa and West Asia on Friday night, has come to life in recent productions by Magen David Congregation and Abir Ya'akob Congregation.
- Venezuela: Concentrated mainly in Caracas.
- Gibraltar: The Jewish community in Gibraltar originates from Tangier and Tétouan.
- United States: The Moroccan Jewish Organization (MJO) was founded in 1972. Founding Members created Moroccan Services & a Synagogue in Forest Hills, NY named Shaar Hashamayim Sephardic Synagogue. Members and Participants of MJO went on to create other Moroccan Synagogues and Batei Midrashot / Houses of [Torah] Study in Manhattan (Manhattan Sephardic Song.), Brooklyn (Netivot Yisrael), Fort Lee, New Jersey, and Cedarhurst (HaChaim veHaShalom) and Philadelphia, Pennsylvania.

== Jewish quarters in Morocco ==
The Jewish quarters in Morocco were called mellahs. Jews in Morocco were considered dhimmis under Muslim law, meaning that they were a protected religious minority distinct from the Muslim majority, and were prevented from participating in certain activities. Following the Pact of Umar in the 7th century, the dhimmis (including Jewish communities) were tolerated, accepted, and integrated into Moroccan society. Morocco's longstanding coexistence between differing religious communities opposed the European Christians' policy of intolerance practiced toward Europe's Jewish peoples. Moroccan Jews lived in the mellahs, in what some modern historians interpret as attempts to ostracize Moroccan Jews and keep them from being exposed to insurgents; The Sultans also desired that Jews to be protected for political reasons, as an attack on minorities was seen as an attack on the Sultans' power. The Sultans thus restricted Jews to the mellahs for their safety, as well as to protect the Sultans' rulings from being tested by insurgents. The word mellah is similar to the Hebrew word for salt, melach (מלח); it refers to the salty, marshy area to which the Jews of northern Morocco were originally transferred and where they gathered. Mellahs were not ghettos and were not structured in manners to the Jewish ghettos in Europe. By the 1900s, most Moroccan cities had a mellah.

== Culture ==
=== Music ===
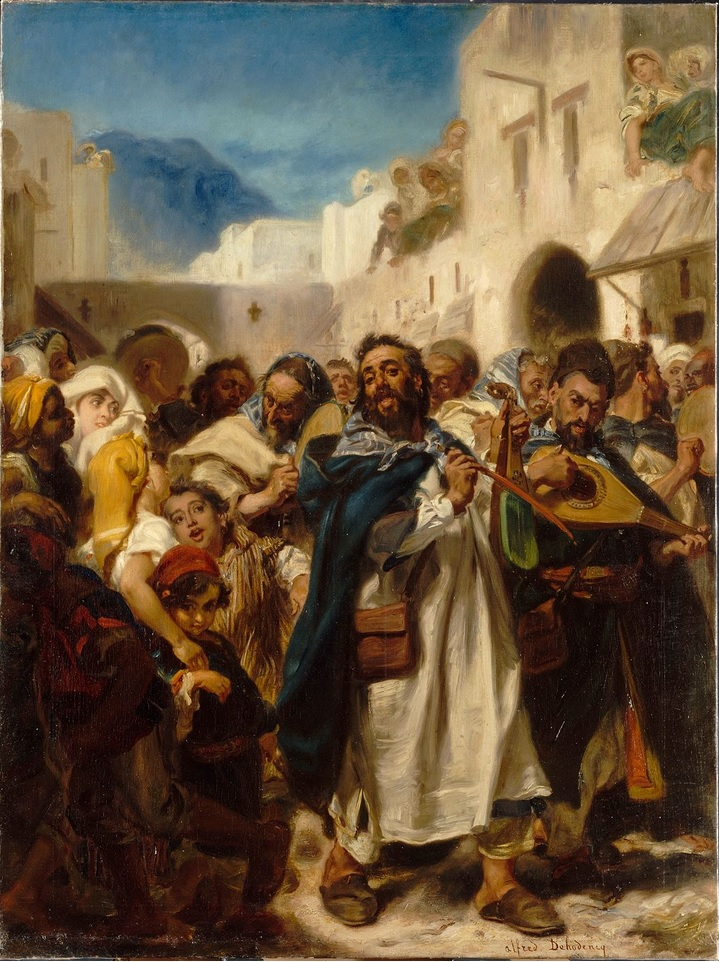
Jewish Festival in Tetuan, Alfred Dehodencq, 1865, Paris Museum of Jewish Art and History

Even before the arrival of Sephardic Jews to Morocco, Moroccan Jews performed and developed the traditions of the Andalusian classical music and introduced it into their liturgical music. In his book "Jews of Andalusia and the Maghreb" on the musical traditions in the Jewish communities of the Morocco, Algeria, Tunisia, and Libya, Haim Zafrani writes: "In Spain and Morocco, Jews were ardent maintainers of Andalusian music and the zealous guardians of its old traditions ... "

Notable Moroccan Jewish musicians include Zohra Al Fassiya, Haim Botbol, Raymonde El Bidaouia, Samy Elmaghribi, LD Malca, and many others.

=== Cuisine ===
Moroccan Jewish cuisine blends local Moroccan flavors, the culinary traditions of Jewish communities, and kosher dietary laws. The cuisine is closely tied to social and religious events, particularly Shabbat and holiday meals, and includes dishes such as couscous and tajine. The cuisine reflects influences from Arab, Berber, French, and Spanish traditions, with emphases on spices, herbs, and vegetables.

One of the most famous dishes of Moroccan Jewish cuisine is the traditional sabbath meal: skhina (سخينة, a literal translation of Hebrew: חמין "hot"), also called dfina (دفينة "buried"). There is also a kosher version of pastilla. Special foods are prepared for holidays, like the post-Passover Mimouna celebration, which features sweet delicacies and symbolic treats such as the mofletta, a sweet pancake served with butter and honey. Mahia, an aperitivo distilled from dates or figs, is traditionally associated with Morocco's Jewish communities.

=== Henna party ===
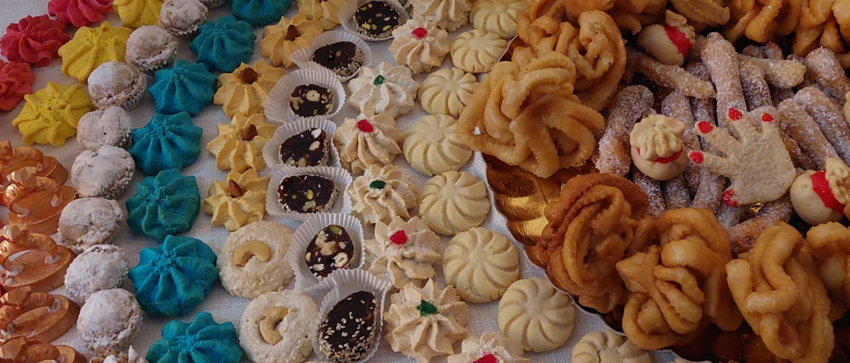
Sweets served in a pre-wedding henna party in Israel

Traditional henna parties usually take place within the week before a special occasion, such as a wedding, Bnei Mitzvah, or baby showers. During pre-wedding Henna parties, the Matriarch of the family (often the grandmother) smudges henna in the palm of the bride and groom to symbolically bestow the new couple with good health, fertility, wisdom, and security. In Moroccan tradition, the henna is believed to protect the couple from demons. The grandmother covers the henna, a dough-like paste produced by mixing crushed henna plant leaves with water, in order to lock in body heat and generate a richer color. Normally, the henna will dye skin orange for up to two weeks. In Moroccan folklore, the bride is exempt of her household duties until the henna completely fades. After the bride and groom are blessed with the henna, the guests also spread henna on their palms to bring good luck.

=== Clothing ===
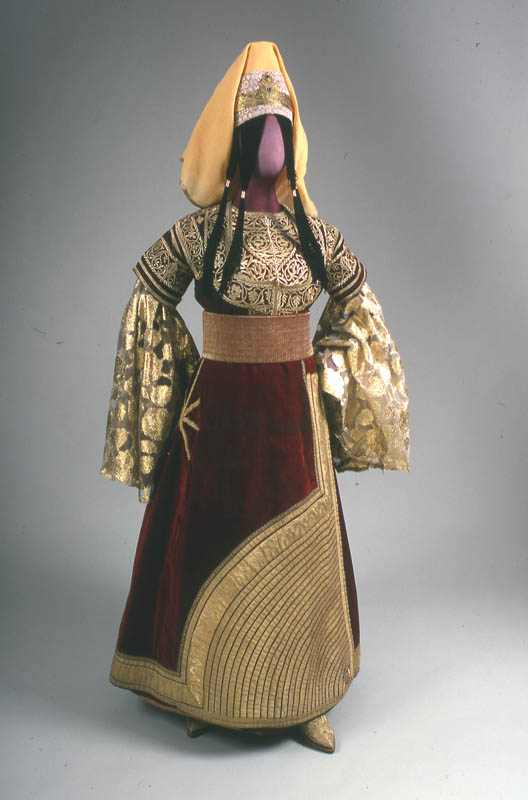
The berberisca dress (or keswa-el-kbira in Arabic) is a traditional dress for a Moroccan Jewish woman for her wedding

Although most Moroccan Jews tend to dress in styles of their adopted countries, traditional Moroccan clothing is sometimes worn during celebrations (Mimouna, weddings, Bar Mitzvas, etc.) or even during more intimate gatherings, such as Shabbat dinners. Men usually wear a white jellaba (jellabiya) cloak while women wear more ornate kaftans.

=== Mimouna ===
Mimouna is celebrated by many Moroccan Jews on the night following the last day of Passover. It has spread to become an unofficial 'national' holiday in Israel, particularly prevalent in cities with large populations of Moroccan Jews (i.e., Ashdod, Ashkelon, and Netanya).

== Representations in art ==
=== Film ===
==== Narrative ====
Laïla Marrakchi's 2005 film Marock about upper-class teenagers in Casablanca features a Moroccan Jewish protagonist named Youri (Matthieu Boujenah) who falls in love with Rita (Morjana Alaoui), a Moroccan Muslim woman.

Hassan Benjelloun's 2007 film Where Are You Going Moshé? depicts the departures of the final remaining Jews from the town of Bejaâd. Mohamed Ismaïl's 2008 film Adieu, Mères is about Jewish and Muslim families in Casablanca amid the mass emigration of Moroccan Jews in the early 1960s, at the time of the Pisces Affair.

Driss Mrini's 2015 film Aida explores Jewish-Muslim relations through music.

Jérôme Cohen-Olivar's 2016 film The Midnight Orchestra, starring Moroccan-Jewish actor Gad Elmaleh, tells the story of the son of a famous musician returning to Morocco upon his father's death.

Nabil Ayouch's 2017 film Razzia features a Jewish restaurateur named Joe (Arieh Worthalter).

==== Documentary ====
Edge of the West is an ethnographic film about Moroccan Jews made in the early 1960s and preserved by the Steven Spielberg Jewish Film Archive. Izza Génini's 1994 film Return to Oulad Moumen depicts a family reunion in a small town south of Marrakesh. Kathy Wazana's 2013 film They Were Promised the Sea investigates the migration of Jewish Moroccans. Younes Laghrari's 2013 film Moroccan Jews: Destinies Undone also explores the different reasons Moroccan Jews left in the 1960s. Kamal Hachkar's 2013 film Tinghir - Jerusalem: Echoes from the Mellah features interviews with people from Tinghir – Jews who left and migrated to Israel and Muslims who stayed—who recall "memories of good neighbourliness and coexistence" in the fifties and sixties before the Jewish exodus.

=== Literature ===
Mohamed Azzedine Tazi's novel Anā al-mansī (“I am the forgotten”) tells the story of Jewish characters in the Mellah of Fes, leading up to the 1967 Arab-Israeli War. Moroccan Jews are also depicted in the novels Le Captif de Mabrouka by El Hassane Aït Moh, Casanfa by Driss Miliani, and Cintra by Hassan Aourid.

=== Visual art ===
==== French Orientalist depictions of Jews in Morocco in the 19th century ====
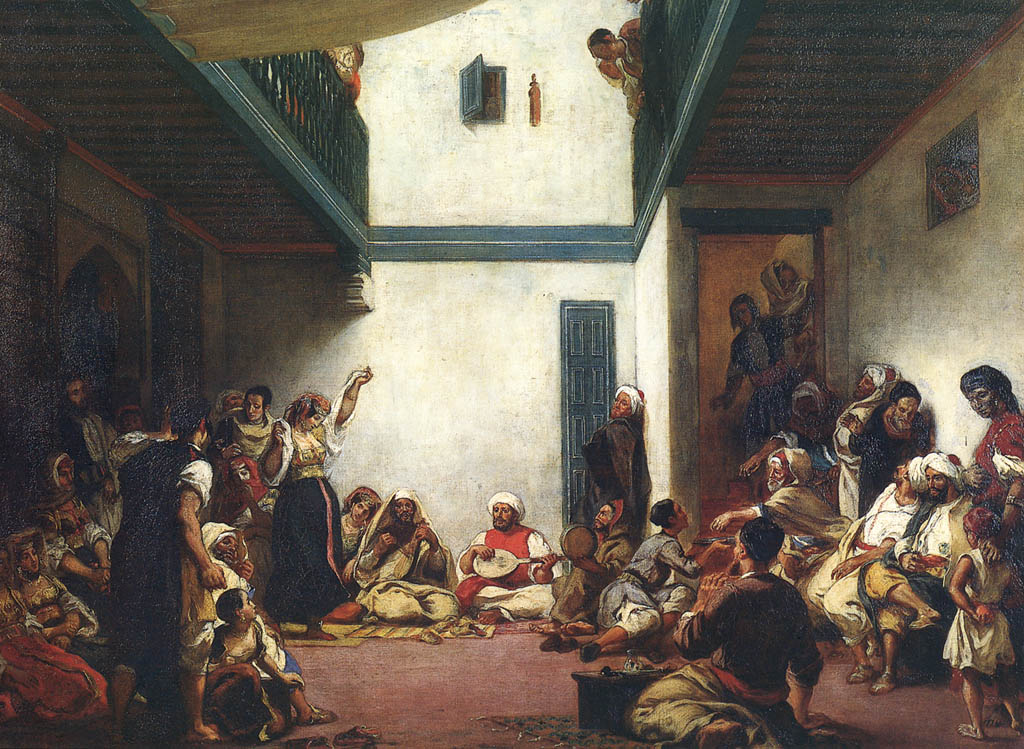
Jewish Wedding in Morocco by Eugène Delacroix, 1839, Louvre, Paris

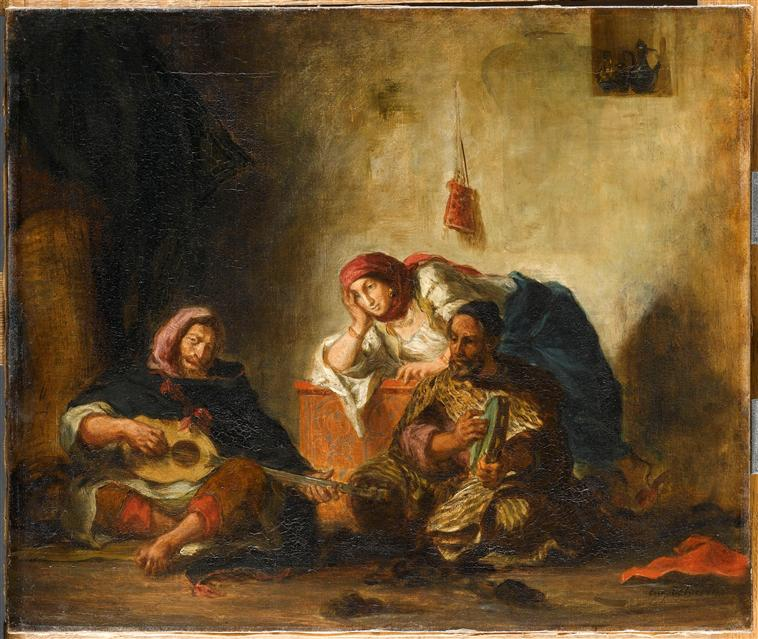
Jewish Musicians of Mogador by Eugène Delacroix, 1847, Louvre, Paris

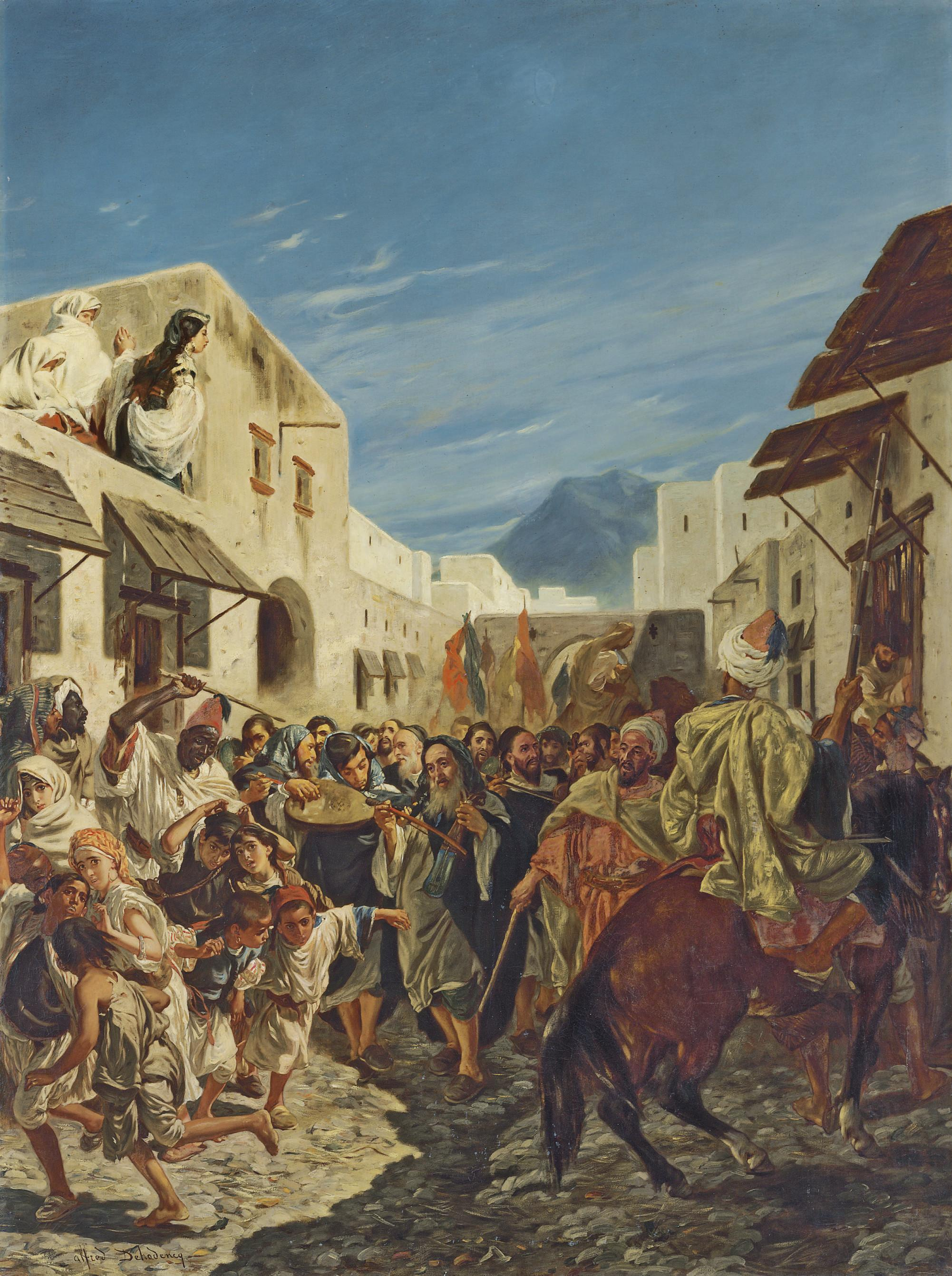
Jewish musicians in the streets of Tetouan by Alfred Dehodencq, 1859

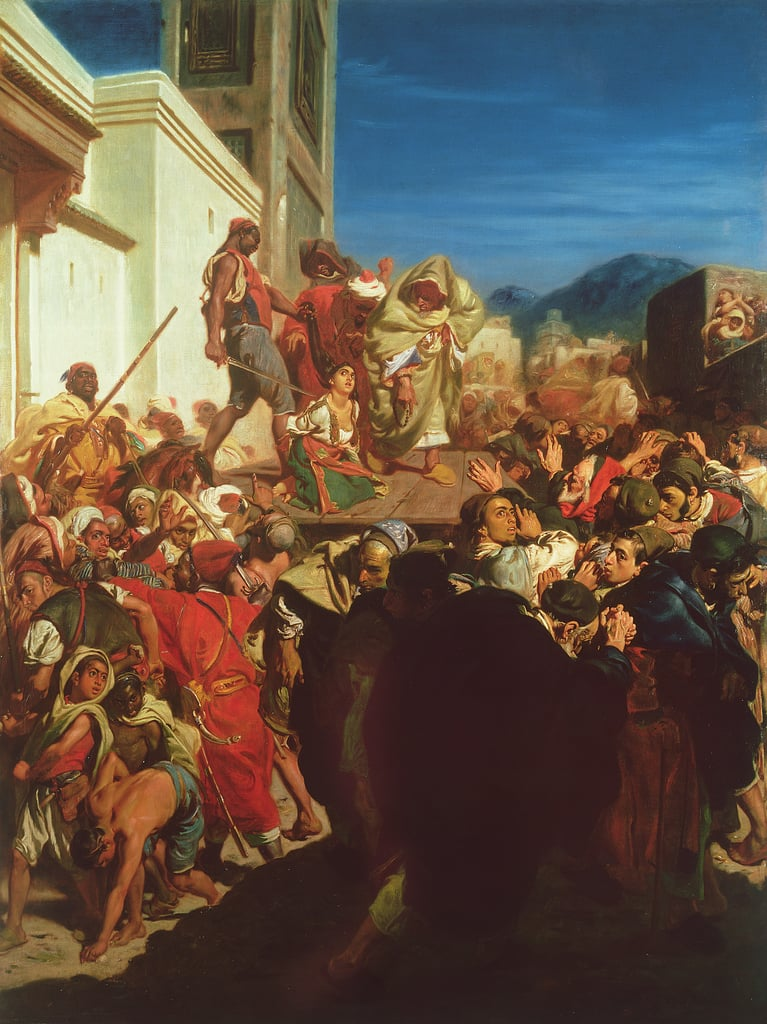
Execution of a Jewess in Tangiers by Alfred Dehodencq, c. 1861—the 1834 execution of Sol Hachuel as imagined by the European painter 27 years later.

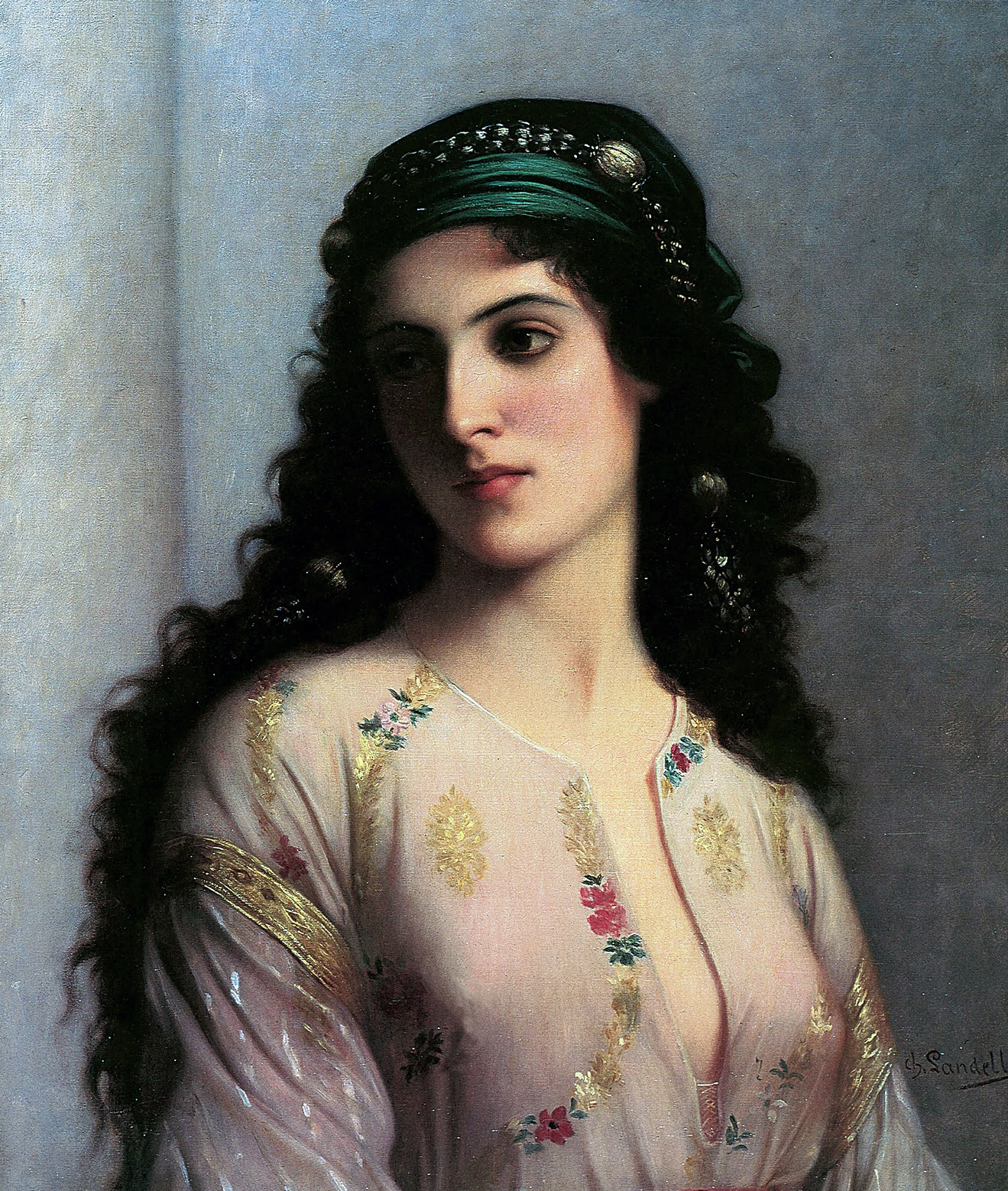
Jewish woman from Tangier by Charles Landelle, 1874, Museum of Fine Arts, Reims

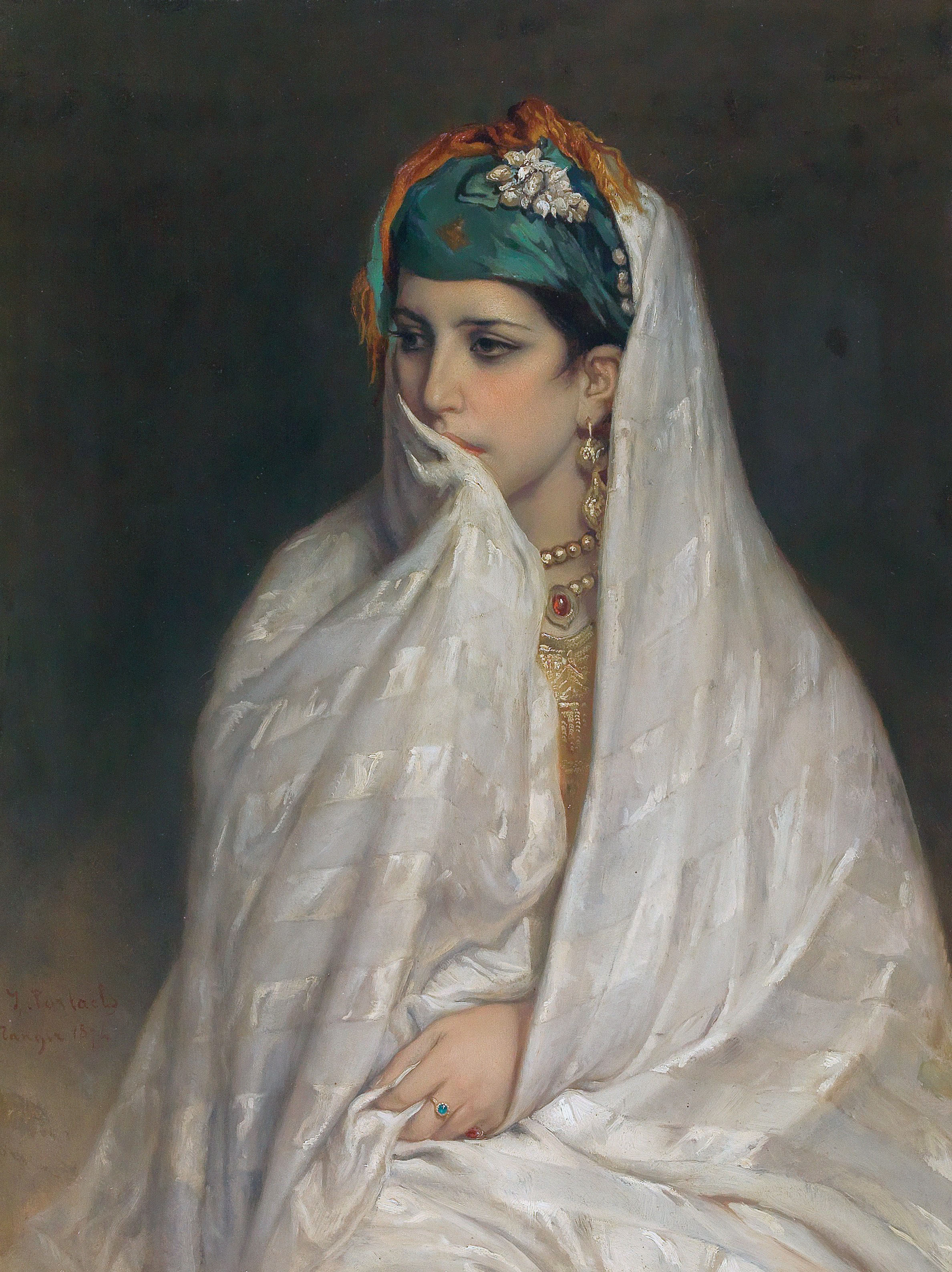
Jewish woman from Tangier by Jean-François Portaels (1874)

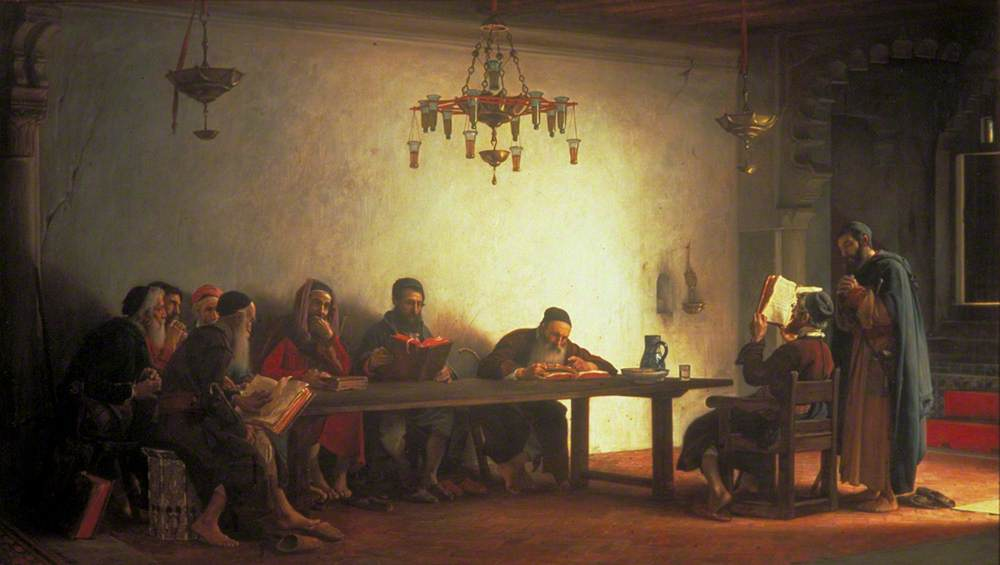
The Reading of the Bible by the Rabbis, Lecomte de Nouÿ, 1882

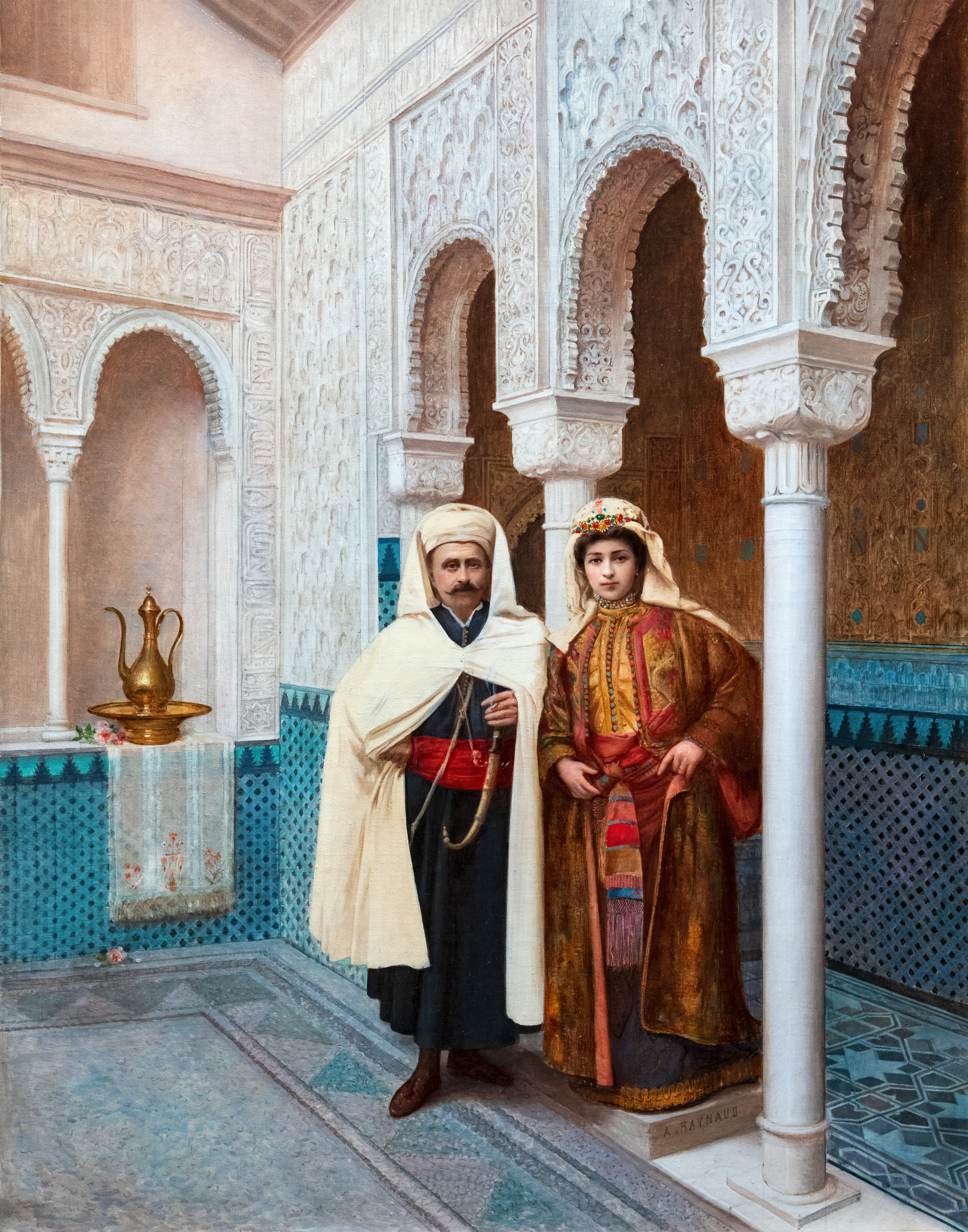
Dignitary couple in a palace or Moroccan Sephardic couple, Auguste Raynaud, 1890, Musée d'Art et d'Histoire de Narbonne

== Religious observance ==
Many Rabanim have passed through and sojourned in Morocco leaving behind great influence. In 2008, a project to preserve Moroccan Torah and the words of its Ḥakhamim was initiated. DarkeAbotenou.com was created members of the Toronto Sephardic Community, devoting their time and effort to increase global awareness of the customs and laws that Jews of Morocco live. Daily French- and English-language emails are sent which contain the customs, laws, and traditional liturgy of Morocco. This daily publication is currently broadcast in both English and French.

=== Liturgy ===
The observer of a typical Moroccan Jewish prayer service will note the presence of Oriental motifs in the melodies. However, unlike the tunes of Eastern rites (Syrian, Iraqi, etc.), which were influenced by Middle Eastern sounds, Moroccan Jewish religious tunes have a uniquely Andalusian feel. Furthermore, just as Eastern liturgical melodies are organized into Maqams, Moroccan liturgy can be classified by Noubas. The Moroccan prayer rite itself is also unique among Sephardic customs. The Moroccan nusach has many unique components but has also incorporated numerous Ashkenazic customs due to the country's proximity and exposure to Europe. Some customs of the Moroccan nusach include:

- Two blessing for Hallel: One blessing (ligmor et ha'Hallel) is said when the full Hallel is recited, while the other blessing (likro et ha'Hallel) is said when the abridged Hallel is recited. Other Sephardim omit the latter.
- Yiru Enenu: The blessing commencing with the words Yiru Enenu (translation: Our eyes shall see) is recited after Hashkivenu in the Arvit service after the Sabbath. Many Ashkenazim say this passage on every weekday night after Hashkivenu. This custom is discussed in Tosafot of Tractate Berakhot 4a.
- Le'David: Before the Arvit service after the Sabbath, three psalms are recited in a unique tune said to be the same tune that King David's soldiers recited them in. The psalms are Chapters 144, 67 and 44 (in that order). Some congregations begin this service with Chapter 16 in a tune that leads up to the other three psalms.
- Pesukei Dezimra: The opening verse of Psalm 30 ("Mizmor Shir Ḥanukat Habayit LeDavid") is added to the remainder of the Psalm during Shaḥarit of Hanuka. Other Sepharadim begin with "Aromimkha" even on Ḥanuka.
- Shir HaShirim: This is usually read between Mincha and Kabbalat Shabbat on the Sabbath eve. Other Sephardic groups tend to read it before Minḥa. Moroccan Jews chant Shir HaShirim with a unique cantillation. A common practice is for a different congregant to sing each chapter.
- Before the repetition of the Amidah in Shaḥarit and Musaf of Rosh Hashana and Yom Kippur, the hymn "Hashem sham'ati shim'akha yareti" (Translation: Hashem, I have heard your speech and was awed) is sung. The origin of this verse is Habakkuk 3:2.
- The Moroccan tune for Torah Reading is unique to the Moroccan tradition, unlike all other Sephardic Jews who merely utilize different variations of the Yerushalmi tune.
- Certain Moroccan Piyutim/Jewish Prayer Melodies and Songs – which are said to come from the songs of the Leviim/Levites – were sung on the steps leading to Jerusalem's Beit HaMikdash/Holy Temple.

=== Religious customs ===
- Psalm 29 and Lekha Dodi are recited sitting down in the Kabbalat Shabbat service.
- Packets of salt are distributed to congregants on the second night of Passover, marking the first counting of the 'Omer. The significance of salt includes the commemoration of the sacrifices in the Temple and other Kabbalistic reasons.
- Pirke Avot is read during the Musaf service of Shabbat between Passover and Shavuot. As well, the custom is for pre-Bar Miṣva boys to read each chapter, and this is usually performed with a special tune.
- After reciting the hamotzie blessing over bread, there is a custom to dip the bread into salt while reciting "Adonai melekh, Adonai malakh, Adonai yimlokh le'olam va'ed" (Translation: God reigns; God has reigned; God will reign for ever and ever). This "verse" is actually a compilation of three verses taken from Psalms and Exodus. The validity of this custom has been disputed among Moroccan Poskim since it may constitute an interruption of a blessing.
- Before the Magid section of the Passover Seder, the Seder plate is raised and passed over the heads of those present while reciting "Bibhilu yaṣanu mi–miṣrayim, halaḥma 'anya bené ḥorin" (Translation: In haste we went out of Egypt [with our] bread of affliction, [now we are] free people). It can be heard here.

== Politics ==
=== Relationship with the Makhzen ===
Moroccan Jews have held important positions in the Makhzen throughout their history. André Azoulay currently serves as an advisor to Muhammad VI of Morocco.

=== Communism ===
Throughout the 20th century, there were several prominent Jewish-Moroccan communists (including Léon Sultan, Elie Azagury, Abraham Serfaty, and Sion Assidon). According to Emily Gottreich, "although the [Moroccan Communist Party] welcomed everyone, it held special appeal for urban educated elite; almost all of Morocco's prominent Jewish intellectuals joined the party at one time or another."

=== Israeli politics ===
In 1959, Moroccan Jews started a riot in Wadi Salib, a neighborhood in Haifa that was populated primarily by immigrants from Morocco, against the conditions Mizrahi Jews faced in Israel. It led to the first of a series of violent demonstrations against the government, the Labor Party and the Histadrut around the country. Shay Hazkani sees the struggle of Moroccan Jews against Ashkenazi racism in Israel that led to the riots as an extension of their political radicalization in the anti-colonial struggle they had been engaged in against France in Morocco.

All ten of the founding members of the Israeli Black Panthers (a group inspired by anti-Zionist Jewish university students) were the children of Jewish-Moroccan immigrants. The 1970-1971 protest movement worked in opposition of "ethnic discrimination and the 'socioeconomic gap.'"

Mordechai Vanunu, a Jewish-Moroccan Israeli whistleblower who revealed information on Israel's nuclear weapons program and was later abducted by Mossad in Rome and incarcerated in Israel, was born in Marrakesh.

In Israel, many Moroccan Jews have risen to prominence in politics, including Amir Peretz, Orly Levy, Arye Deri, Miri Regev, 2026 prime minister candidate Gadi Eisenkot, and Naama Lazimi.

== Genetics ==
Over the years, the Moroccan Jews' DNA was examined and studied by numerous studies, the general image of it showed that in terms of Y-DNA it was mainly from the same Levantine source as the vast majority of the world's Jewry, meaning that they too are descendants of the ancient Israelites of the Biblical times. In the case of Ashkenazi and Sephardic Jews (in particular Moroccan Jews), who are apparently closely related, the minority non-Levantine component of their DNA is southern European.

Analysis of mitochondrial DNA of the Jewish populations of the Maghreb (Morocco, Tunisia, and Libya) was the subject of a detailed study in 2008 by Doron Behar et al. 149 Moroccan Jews participated. According to Table S1, some of their reported mitochondrial DNA haplogroups include H4a1a, H6, HV1c, HV0, L1b1, and X2b1. The analysis in the section titled "Typically African mtDNA variants in non-Ashkenazi Jews" concluded that Jews from this region do not share the mitochondrial DNA haplogroups M1 and U6 that are typical of the North African Berber and North African Arab populations.

Contradicting Behar's 2008 study, later studies did find haplogroups M1 and U6 in some Moroccan Jews, including two samples collected by Luisa Pereira et al. for their 2010 paper that are listed as being members of haplogroup U6a1 and each identified as a "person of Jewish ancestry" from Morocco. These two samples specifically belong to the branch U6a1b3a whose terminal mutations are C11971T and C11039T. One also finds haplogroups M1a1, U6a1a1, and U6a7a1 in Moroccan Jews. In fact, Behar's own samples DMB01943 and DMB01972 are Moroccan Jews listed in Table S1 of his study as being members of haplogroup U6a1.

Behar et al. concluded that among Maghrebi Jews, many do not carry significant Arab or Berber genetic admixture, "consistent with social restrictions imposed by religious restrictions," or endogamy. This study also found genetic similarities between the Ashkenazi and Maghrebi Jews of European mitochondrial DNA pools, but differences between both of these of the diaspora and Jews from West Asia.

In a 2012 study by Campbell et al., however, the Moroccan/Algerian, Djerban/Tunisian and Libyan subgroups of Maghreb Jewry were found to demonstrate varying levels of West Asian (40-42%), European (37-39%) and North African ancestry (20-21%), with Moroccan and Algerian Jews tending to be genetically closer to each other than to Djerban Jews and Libyan Jews. According to the study:

"distinctive North African Jewish population clusters with proximity to other Jewish populations and variable degrees of Middle Eastern, European, and North African admixture. Two major subgroups were identified by principal component, neighbor joining tree, and identity-by-descent analysis—Moroccan/Algerian and Djerban/Libyan—that varied in their degree of European admixture. These populations showed a high degree of endogamy and were part of a larger Ashkenazi and Sephardic Jewish group. By principal component analysis, these North African groups were orthogonal to contemporary populations from North and South Morocco, Western Sahara, Tunisia, Libya, and Egypt. Thus, this study is compatible with the history of North African Jews—founding during Classical Antiquity with proselytism of local populations, followed by genetic isolation with the rise of Christianity and then Islam, and admixture following the emigration of Sephardic Jews during the Inquisition."

A 2026 study by the Avotaynu DNA Project concluded that about 71 percent of the founding Y-chromosome DNA lineages of Moroccan Jews originated in the Middle East, including multiple lineages that "are demonstrably Levantine", whereas 4.5 percent of them came from the Maghreb and 11 percent from the Iberian Peninsula.

== Miscellaneous ==
Jewish life in Morocco during the mid-20th century, including the emigration of one rural Jewish village, was depicted in Arnan Zafrir's documentary Edge of The West.

== See also ==
- History of the Jews in Morocco
- History of the Jews under Muslim rule
- Migration of Moroccan Jews to Israel
- Moroccan Jews in Israel
- Sephardic Jews
- Maghrebi Jews
- Moroccans
- Jewish community in Casablanca
- Jewish Community of Tétouan
- Amazonian Jews
- Operation Yachin
- History of the Jews in Africa
