= Benchimol =

Benchimol is a surname. Notable people with the surname include:

- Guilherme Benchimol, founder of XP Inc.
- Gilson Benchimol Tavares, a Cape Verdean professional footballer
- Haim Benchimol, a Moroccan businessman and newspaper publisher
- Samuel Benchimol, a Brazilian economist, scientist, and professor
