= Abraham Bentes =

Brazilian Army commander and linguist

- Born: 1912; Itaituba
- Died: 1990 (aged 77–78)
- Military career
- Allegiance: Brazil
- Branch: Army
- Rank: General
- Other work: Linguist

Abraham Ramiro Bentes (1912 – 1990) was a Brazilian Army commander and linguist.

Born in Itaituba, Pará State in Northern Brazil, he was the offspring of Jewish immigrants from Morocco. Bentes joined the Brazilian Army in the 1930s, specializing in antiaircraft artillery and coastal defense. After a long and distinguished career, he achieved the rank of four-star general and was the inspector-general of the Army. After retirement from active service, he became involved in Jewish community affairs in Rio de Janeiro, serving as president of the Hebrew Union Shel Guemilut Hassadim congregation and as an officer of the Clube Hebraica. General Bentes also wrote extensively about the history of the Sephardi community in Brazil and their language.

== Works ==
- Os Sefardim e a Hakitia (1981)
- Das Ruínas de Jerusalém à Verdejante Amazônia: Formação da 1ª Comunidade Israelita Brasileira (1987)
- Primeira comunidade israelita brasileira : tradições, genealogia, pré-história (1989)
