= Raphael Ankawa =

Moroccan rabbi and scholar

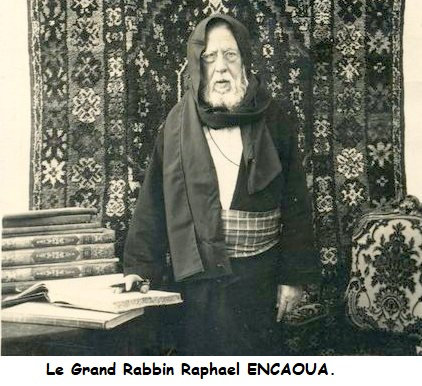
- Rabbi Ankawa

Personal life
- Born: 1848 Salé, Morocco
- Died: 3 August 1935 (aged 86–87) Salé, Morocco

Religious life
- Religion: Judaism

Raphael Ben Mordechai Ankawa, also spelled Ankavah or Encouau, (1848–1935) was the Chief Rabbi of Morocco and a noted commentator, talmudist, posek, and author.

== Biography ==
Born in Salé, Morocco in 1848, he is known to the Jews of North Africa as "Malach Raphael" or the Angel Raphael. In 1880, he became President of the Rabbinical Court or Beit Din in Sale and founded a yeshiva there. In 1918, he was appointed the first President of the High Rabbinical Court of Rabat, Morocco. He published numerous works on jurisprudence, including Karne Reem (Jerusalem 1910), Hadad Vetema (Jerusalem 1978), Paamone Zahav (Jerusalem 1912), and Paamon Ve-Rimon (Jerusalem 1967); some of them continue to be regarded as authoritative.

== Funeral and legacy ==
His funeral, on 3 August 1935, was visited by over 50,000 followers. His grave became a place of Jewish pilgrimage. Rabbi Ankawa is survived by hundreds of descendants today, mostly in Israel, France, Venezuela and the United States. Leading Halachic rabbis refer to his books as sources for contemporary Jewish legal works.

== Bibliography ==
- Ankawa, Raphael ben Mordecai. Sefer Pa`amone zahav: rigle `emdah be-mishor Be-makhelim avarekh et H. ... / koh divre Refa'el ben Mordechai Ankava. Pp. 179 [i.e. 358]. Yerushala[y]im: Bi-defus Sh. ha-Levi Tsukerman, 672 [1912].
- Ankawa, Raphael ben Mordecai. Sefer Sh. u-t. Karne re'em. [Brooklyn: Ahim Goldenberg,2 vols. 752 (1991). 2 v.
- Ankawa, Raphael ben Mordecai. Sefer To`afot Re'em: she'elot u-teshuvot be-arba`ah helke Shulhan `arukh / pe`ulat Refa'el Ankava. Pp. 28, 180 (i.e. 360) 52. Yerushalayim: Hotsa'at Ahavat Shalom, 760 [1999]
- Ankawa, Raphael ben Mordecai. Sefer Karne Re'em: she'elot u-teshuvot be-`inyene Shulhan `arukh Yoreh de`ah, Even ha-`ezer ve-Hoshen mishpat / pe`ulat Refa'el Ankava. Pp. 24, 251 [i.e. 502]. Yerushalayim: Hotsa'at Ahavat Shalom, 760 [1999].
