= Isaac Benayon Sabba =

Brazilian entrepreneur (1907–1996)

Isaac Benayon Sabbá
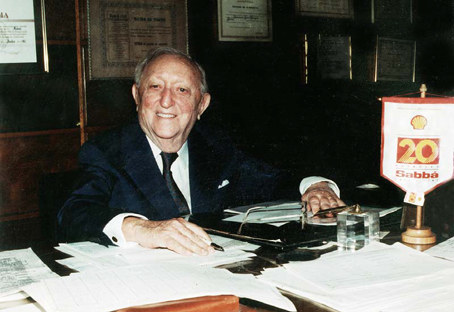
- Born: 12 February 1907; Belém, Pará, Brazil
- Died: 22 March 1996 (aged 89); Manaus, Amazonas, Brazil
- Other name: Isaac Sabbá
- Occupation: Businessman
- Spouse: Irene (née. Assayag) Gonçalves Sabbá (m. 1942)
- Children: 5

Isaac Benayon Sabba (Arabic: إسحاق بن آيون صباح ; Portuguese: Isaac Benayon Sabbá; Hebrew: יצחק בניון שבח; February 12, 1907 – March 22, 1996) was a Brazilian entrepreneur. He founded the IB Sabbá Ltda. group and Petroleo Sabbá S.A., the largest business group operating on the Brazilian Amazon region during the twentieth century.

== Early life ==
Isaac Sabbá was born into a Jewish family of Moroccan origin, he was the third son among five children of Primo Sabbá and Fortunata (née Benayon) Sabbá. His father was the son of Moroccan immigrants born in Cametá when it was the capital of the state of Grão-Pará (present Pará). His mother was born in Faro, Portugal; her parents were both Jewish immigrants from Morocco. He is a descendant of the Spanish Rabbi Abraham Saba.

His family moved to Manaus for his older sister wedding, because his future brother-in-law had offered employment when he was 12. Soon he began working as an office assistant representative of his brother-in-law. The workload did not allow him to study, interrupting their school life in the second grade. However, he reserved his spare time for reading, a habit that he cultivated all his life.

== Career ==
Sabbá founded the firm IB Sabbá, an exporting firm and later changing the name to IB Sabbá & Cia. Ltda. his most successful company was the Petróleo Sabbá, the company had the participation of his nephew Moyses Israel.

The group had diversified its business portfolio created over 42 factories, as FiteJuta (beneficiation Jute), alligator leather benefiting Co., oil refinery and distribution of petrol. They exported rosewood, Brazil nut, Oil refinery among other products of the extractive industry.

=== Early career ===
In 1930 he joined in partnership with one of his brothers, and founded the firm J.Sabbá representations & Cia. He soon realized the limited potential of this line of business, and moved to an export firm. Began, then a sort of interstate commerce while exporting firms of Amazonas then existing employed its activities almost exclusively in foreign trade.

==== World War II ====
With the outbreak of World War II, the Federal Government established the monopoly of rubber, a time when Isaac Sabbá company accounted for 64% of export of the Amazon. This would not be the only time that the government would nationalize his companies.

In 1942, Isaac Sabbá had founded the Companhia Mercantil Comissionária e Exportadora, transformed later in Devel – Amazon Development Society Ltda., in order to increase the elastic-tire businesses.

That company was equipped vessels that sailed all state rivers in search of latex. Also created during the war, the company Jacy Paraná, in the current state of Rondônia, aiming to increase rubber production.

==== After World War II ====
With the rapid increase in consumption of chewing gum after World War II, he set up a raw materials dehydration plant, with the aim of ensuring the placement of the Amazon product in the international market. He did the same with Brazilian nuts.

=== Business Expansion ===
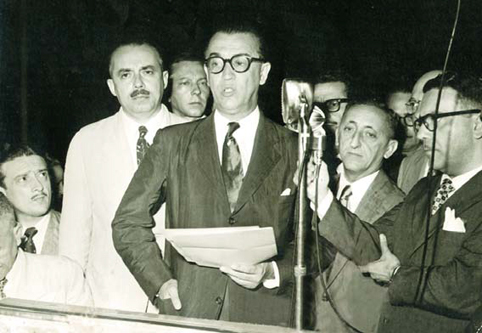
Isaac Sabbá and Brazilian President Juscelino Juscelino Kubitschek

Understanding the weaknesses of the Amazonian business environment, characterized by poverty and lack of financial resources that could be used for the exploitation of its immense natural wealth, he studied and put in action a funding system that benefited the producer. After analysing the situation of the local industries, he saw that it was not possible to increase the production of raw materials without a fuel supply, at an affordable price on the Amazon region. Hence came the idea of building an oil refinery in Manaus which became Reman.

He was called by the Time Magazine and the Los Angeles Times as "The King of the Amazon".

==== Oil Business ====
Isaac Benayon Sabba Bust at REMAN (Manaus Oil Refinary)

The Oil Refinery Isaac Sabbá built on the shores of the Rio Negro in Manaus, began operations on September 6, 1956, under the name Companhia de Petroleo do Amazonas (COPAM; English: Petroleum Company of the Amazon). The refinery was officially opened on January 3, 1957, with the presence of President Juscelino Kubitschek.

However, only to produce fuel was not enough, most important was to make them accessible to other consumer centers, his aim was the integration of the Amazon region into economic life of the country.

In 1971 IB Sabbá partnered with Royal Dutch Shell and formed the society Petróleo Sabbá SA, which took over the activities of the Petroleum department of IB Sabbá & Cia. Ltda. In the same year COPAM was nationalized by the military government, and was renamed Refinaria de Manaus (REMAN; English: Manaus Refinery), only in 1996 after his death it was renamed Refinaria Isaac Sabbá. On May 31, 1974, COPAM was incorporated into the Petrobras System as REMAN.

A soccer team was named after a Petroleo Sabbá gas station, the Associação Atlética Cori-Sabbá.

== Personal life and death ==
Sabbá married Irene (née Assayag) Gonçalves Sabbá (1925–2006) in 1942. The couple had 5 children, Moises Gonçalves Sabbá (b.1944), Alberto Mimon Gonçalves Sabbá (b. 1945), Mario Gonçalves Sabbá (b.1947), Ester Gonçalves Sabbá (b.1949) and Débora Gonçalves Sabbá (1963–1963). He took as a pupil his nephew Moyses Benarrós Israel, who was his right hand during all of his life.

Isaac Sabbá died on March 26, 1996, of pneumonia. He was survived by his wife Irene and his four children, eight grandchildren and three great grandchildren.

== Philanthropy ==
Sabbá built the Military Hospital of Manaus the federal funding for the construction of the hospital would be returned, the hospital that still serves up to its objectives.

When the CEM – Manaus Electricity Company – was implemented in the city it had Isaac Sabbá as a guarantor. He also surveyed the necessary resources with banks in order to pay the payroll of the employees. In order to help, he putted the equipment and machinery of his refinery at the disposal of the new company, without charge.

Isaac Sabbá also helped create and was the one who helped the BEA – Amazonas state bank – in the most difficult moments, lending money to that institution whenever its cash needs required it.

As a Jew throughout his life, he was a member of the Amazonas Jewish Committee, and he raised money to build Manaus synagogue Beit Yaacob – Rebi Meyr.
