= Strangford Treaty =

1810 treaty between the United Kingdom and Portugal

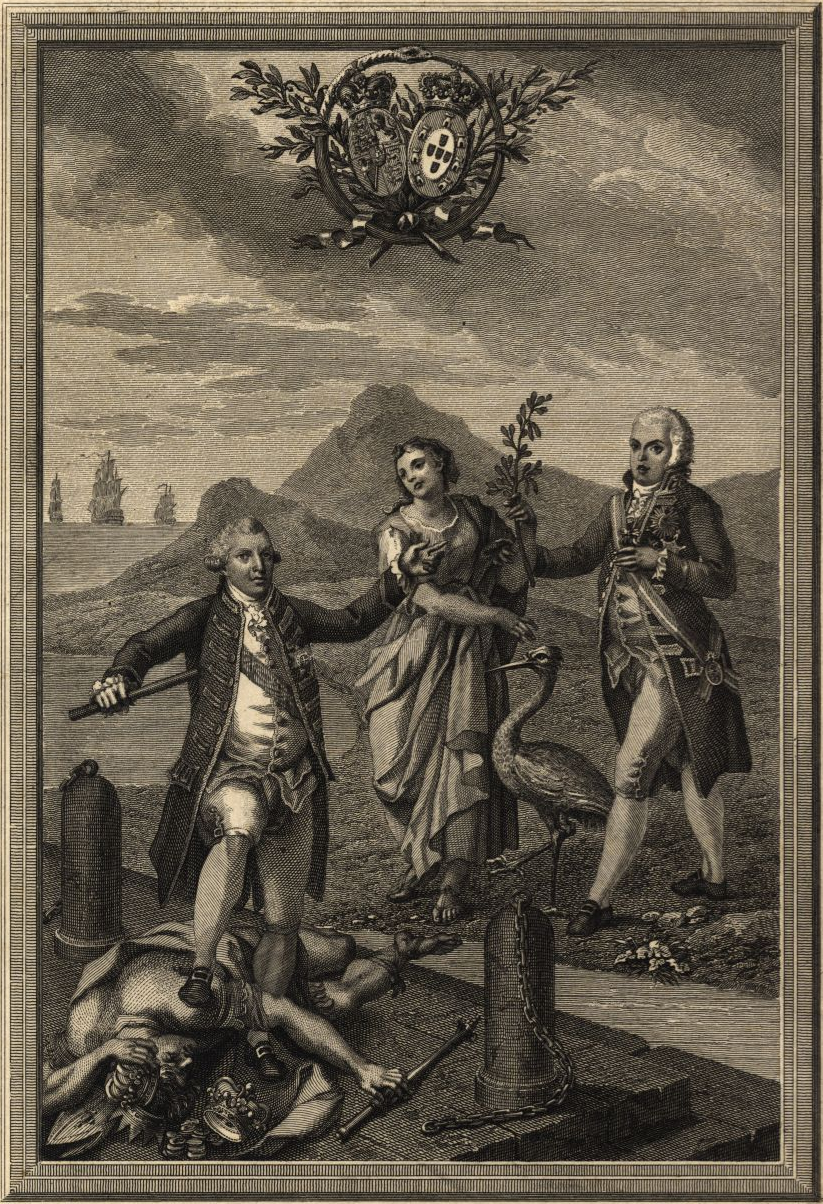
Allegorical engraving printed at the time of the 1810 treaty showing George III of Great Britain and Ireland and the Prince Regent of Portugal, the future João VI

The Strangford Treaty, as it is known in the United Kingdom (sometimes known as the Anglo-Brazilian Treaty of 1810), also known as the Treaty of Commerce and Navigation in Portugal and Brazil (Tratado de Comércio e Navegação), was a treaty signed at Rio de Janeiro the 19th of February 1810 by the British and the Portuguese government, then in exile in its colony of Brazil. The treaty granted the British special commercial privileges, notably preferential tariffs of 15% on British goods imported into Brazil, in exchange for their defense of Portugal and its colonies during the Napoleonic War. Portugal also agreed to limit the importation of African slaves and to consider the abolition of the slave trade.

In 1785, a decree proclaimed that Brazilian factories could only produce cloth that would be used for clothing slaves or to make sacks for food goods. This decree was lifted in 1808, accompanied by an open ports policy. To help recover their internal industry, Brazil imposed Tariff protection on imports.

During this period, the British had helped the Portuguese government to flee the invading French army and find refuge in Rio de Janeiro. The Anglo-Irish diplomat, Percy Smythe, 6th Viscount Strangford, negotiated an agreement to grant Britain trade privileges with Brazil. In return for these Brazilian concessions, the British would convince the Portuguese government to recognise Brazilian independence.

The result of the treaty was that exports from the United Kingdom came to dominate markets in Brazil. Imported British goods only received a 15% duty, compared to 25% for goods from other nations. It also limited legal recourse by Brazilians against British subjects and allowed British agents to become established throughout the country. As a result, low cost imported goods from Britain which were manufactured by machine industry began to swamp markets that had previously been dominated by the local handicrafts industry. Exports of tobacco and sugar from Brazil to British markets were prohibited, which protected producers in the British West Indies.

The treaty was written so as to expire in 1825 unless renewed. It remained in effect until 1844.
