= Sultana Levy Rosenblatt =

Brazilian writer

Sultana Levy Rosenblatt (July 1910 in Belém, Brazil – March 28, 2007 in McLean, Virginia, USA) was a Jewish Brazilian writer of Moroccan-Brazilian heritage, knowledgeable in Haketia. She lived in the Brazilian Amazon basin. Her works include, Chavito Prieto, Barracão, and As Virgens de Ipujucama. Later in her life, she published several pieces in the Revista Morashá; mostly on Jewish topics for children, such as "Antônio José, o Judeu", "Como Viemos Parar na Amazônia", "As Aventuras de Jonas", "As Aventuras de Daniel e Seus Amigos", "David e Golias", "Yom Kipur lá em Casa, em Belém", "Mulheres na História", "O Rei Sábio", and "O segredo de Sansão".
