= Where Are You Going Moshé? =

Where Are You Going Moshe ?
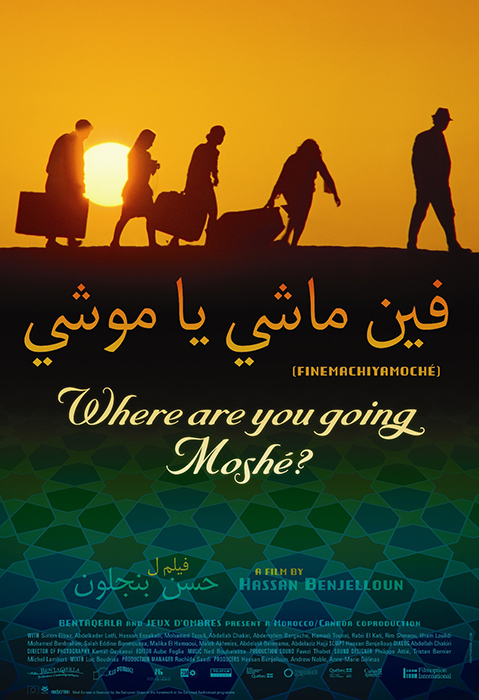
- Theatrical release poster
- Directed by: Hassan Benjelloun
- Written by: Hassan Benjelloun
- Produced by: Hassan Benjelloun; Anne-Marie Gélinas; Andrew Noble
- Starring: Simon Elbaz; Abdelkader Lotfi; Malika El Hamaoui; Hamadi Tounsi; Rim Shmaou; Ilham Loulidi; Hassan Essakalli; Abderrahim Bargache
- Release date: 2007
- Running time: 90 minutes
- Country: Morocco
- Languages: Moroccan Arabic; French

Where Are You Going Moshé? (Moroccan Arabic: فين ماشي ياموشي, romanized: Fin Mashi Ya Moshe, French: Où vas-tu Moshé?) is a Moroccan-Canadian film directed by Hassan Benjelloun and released in 2007. Set up in the small town of Boujad, the movie depicts the turmoil created in a small town after the exodus of the Jews of Morocco, especially between the last Jew in town, Shlomo, and the owner of the only bar in the town, Mustapha. The film, although a work of fiction, is shot in the style of a documentary. The plot was largely inspired by an original script by Ahmed Seffar Andaloussi.

== Plot ==
Mustapha is the manager of the only bar in the small town of Bejaâd, in Morocco. The Islamic authorities in the town are eager to close it because consumption of alcohol is prohibited to the Muslims, but they cannot do anything since the city remains inhabited by a Jewish community. As long as there are customers who are allowed to consume alcohol, Mustapha is free to go on with his business. But when Moroccan Jews are starting to immigrate to the new state of Israel, and as the town is emptied of its Jewish community, Mustapha is terrified about having to close his business. He will attempt the impossible to keep the only remaining Jew in Boujad, Shlomo Bensoussan—whose wife Freha and daughter Rachel moved to Israel—from leaving the town.

== Cast ==
- Simon Elbaz as Shlomo Bensoussan
- Abdelkader Lotfi as Mustapha
- Malika El Hamaoui as Zaina
- Hamadi Tounsi as Moshe
- Rim Shmaou as Rachel Bensoussan
- Ilham Loulidi as Freha Bensoussan
- Hassan Essakalli as Abdelsammad
- Abderrahim Bargache as The Rabbi
