= Hassan Benjelloun =

Film maker

- Born: April 12, 1950 (age 76); Settat, Morocco
- Occupation: Film director

Hassan Benjelloun (Arabic: حسن بنجلون, romanized: Ḥasan Binjallūn; born April 12, 1950) is a Moroccan director, producer and screenwriter. He is best known for his 2007 comedy Where Are You Going Moshé?.

== Biography ==
Benjelloun was born in Settat. He was born in a family of ten children in 1950. In 1965, he studied science at Abdelmalek Essaadi High School in Kénitra. He attended the Abdelmalek Essaadi high school in Kenitra before passing his baccalaureate in Caen where he continued his studies, pursuing postgraduate studies in pharmacy. He graduated in 1976 and worked at the Faculty of Medicine in Casablanca. In 1979, He passed his bachelor's degree in Caen where he continued by studying pharmacy from which he graduated in 1976. He decided to open a pharmacy in his native town of Settat. In 1980, he decided to study directing at the Conservatoire libre du cinéma français (CLCF) in Paris where he obtained his diploma.

Hassan Ben Jelloun's love and passion for the seventh art led him to register in cinema and arts clubs and contribute to many cultural activities. Thus, between 1976 and 1979, he directed several medical surveys and films.

In 1980, Hassan decided to study directing at the Free Conservatory of French Cinema (CLCF) in Paris where he received his diploma.

In 1983, he directed his first short film "A sense unique"

Upon returning to Morocco, he joined forces with four Moroccan directors to create, in 1989, The Casablanca Group. They would go on to make five feature films, including "La Fête des Autres", Benjelloun's first fiction film.

In 2010, he directed "Les oubliés de l'Histoire". This film was screened at the 11th National Film Festival of Tangier. It was awarded the prize for Best Male Lead for Amine Ennaji's performance.

In July 2019, Benjelloun presided over the jury of the International Feature Film category at the Écrans Noirs Festival.

== Awards ==
In July 2019, Hassan Benjelloun was nominated as the president of the International Feature Film's jury of the Cameroonian Festival, Écrans Noirs 2019

== Partial filmography ==
=== Feature films ===
Sources:

- 1990: La Fête des autres
- 1993: Yarit
- 1998: Les Amis d'hier
- 2001: Jugement d'une femme
- 2002: Le Pote
- 2004: La Chambre Noire
- 2007: Where Are You Going Moshé?
- 2009: Les Oubliés de l'histoire
- 2010: Zmanna
- 2011: 5ème corde
- 2013: La Lune Rouge
