= Samuel Benchimol =

Brazilian economist

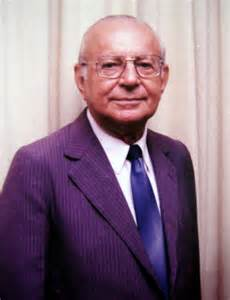
- Born: Samuel Isaac Benchimol; July 13, 1923; Manaus, Amazonas, Brazil
- Died: July 5, 2002 (aged 78); Manaus, Amazonas, Brazil
- Occupations: Businessman, economist, scientist and professor

Samuel Isaac Benchimol (July 13, 1923 – July 5, 2002) was a Brazilian economist, scientist, and professor of Moroccan-Jewish descent. He was also one of the leading experts on the Amazon region. He was assigned to the Amazonian Academy of Literature, Professor Emeritus at the Federal University of Amazonas (where he taught for more than 50 years), researcher at the FEA, community leader president of the Commitê Israelita do Amazonas (Amazon Jewish committee) and entrepreneur founding member of the group Bemol and Fogás.

== Publications ==
- Benchimol, S. (1958). O Banco do Brasil na economia do Amazonas. Rio de Janeiro: Superintendência do Plano da Valorização Econômica da Amazônia (SPVEA).
- Benchimol, S. (1965). O cearense na Amazônia: inquérito antropogeográfico sobre um tipo de imigrante (2 ed.). Rio de Janeiro: SPVEA Seção de Documentação e Relações Públicas.
- Benchimol, S. (1965). Pólos de crescimento e desenvolvimento econômico. Manaus.
- Benchimol, S. (1966). Estrutura geo-social e econômica da Amazônia. Manaus: Govêrno do Estado do Amazonas.
- Benchimol, S. (1968). Política e estratégia na grande Amazônia brasileira. Belém: Estante Universitária.
- Benchimol, S. (1977). Amazônia, um pouco-antes e além-depois (Coleção Amazoniana, 1). Manaus: Editora U. Calderaro.
- Benchimol, S. (1983). Cartas do primeiro Governador da Capitania de São José do Rio Negro, Joaquim de Mello e Póvoas, 1758–1761. (Memória geosocial e histórica do Amazonas). Manaus: Univ. do Amazonas, Comissão de Documentação e Estudos da Amazônia.
- Benchimol, S. (1998). Eretz Amazônia: os judeus na Amazônia. ISBN 85-86512-21-4
- Benchimol, S. (1999). Amazônia: formação social e cultural. Manaus: Valer Editora. ISBN 85-86512-23-0
