= Tabite or Not Tabite =

- Directed by: Nabyl Lahlou
- Written by: Nabyl Lahlou
- Starring: Nabyl Lahlou, Sophia Hadi, Amal Ayouch
- Cinematography: Mostapha Marjane
- Edited by: Nabyl Lahlou
- Production company: Loukkos Film
- Release date: 2005
- Running time: 132 min
- Country: Morocco
- Language: Moroccan Arabic
- Budget: 170.000 MAD

Tabite or Not Tabite is a 2005 Moroccan drama film directed by Nabyl Lahlou. The film was inspired by the trial of Mustapha Tabet. Tabet's family filed a complaint to prohibit the preview of the film. Summoned to court in Rabat, the director successfully pleaded his case himself, arguing that it was his duty to make films about this period. The preview was ultimately held at the Mohamed V Theater in Rabat.

== Synopsis ==
Ali Brahma visits his homeland for the first time in order to attend his father's funeral. This first trip to Morocco coincides with the trial of police commissioner and serial rapist Mohamed Mustapha Tabit. On the flight back to Paris, Ali meets Zakia Malik. Together, they look into the Tabet trial to write a play and a film script.

== Cast ==
- Sophia Hadi
- Nabyl Lahlou
- Amal Ayouch
- Mourad Abderrahim
- Younes Megri
- Othmane Jennane

== Awards and accolades ==
- Prize for Best Scenario at the 9th edition of the Moroccan National Film Festival in Tangier
