= The Return of the Son =

- Directed by: Ahmed Boulane
- Written by: Ahmed Boulane
- Starring: Warren Guetta, Younes Megri, Myriam Bella
- Cinematography: Sergio Salvati, Luca Luparini
- Edited by: Arbi Ben Ali
- Music by: Joël Pellegrini
- Release date: 2011
- Running time: 84 minutes
- Country: Morocco
- Languages: Moroccan Arabic, French

The Return of the Son (French: Le Retour du fils) is a Moroccan film directed by Ahmed Boulane and released in 2011. It is Boulane's third feature film and was screened at multiple national film festivals.

== Synopsis ==
Fifteen years after being kidnapped by his French mother, Mehdi, now in his twenties, returns to Morocco to see his father Aziz. The young man, half French and half Moroccan, wants to get to know his native country. He meets a young Moroccan woman and spends less time at home with his father. Aziz disapproves of the relationship and argues more and more frequently with his son. One day, after a particularly heated argument, Mehdi leaves and does not come home at night. Aziz's worst nightmare begins.

== Cast ==
- Warren Guetta
- Younes Megri
- Myriam Bella
- Emmanuelle Jeser
- Nail Messaoudi
