= Megri =

Megri may refer to:

- Fethiye, Turkey
- Meghri, Armenia
- Les Freres Megri, A Moroccan psychedelic rock band
