= Hicham Ibrahimi =

Moroccan actor

- Born: Casablanca, Morocco
- Occupation: Actor

Hicham Ibrahimi is a Moroccan actor.

== Filmography ==
- Chevaux de fortune (1995)
- Un simple fait divers (1997)
- Elle est diabétique et hypertendue et elle refuse de crever (1999)
- Ali Zaoua: Prince of the Streets (2000)
- Noura ( 2003)
- Amis du Canada ( 2004)
- Wahda Men Bazaf (2007)
- Châtiment (2009)
