= Ahmed Boulane =

Moroccan film director

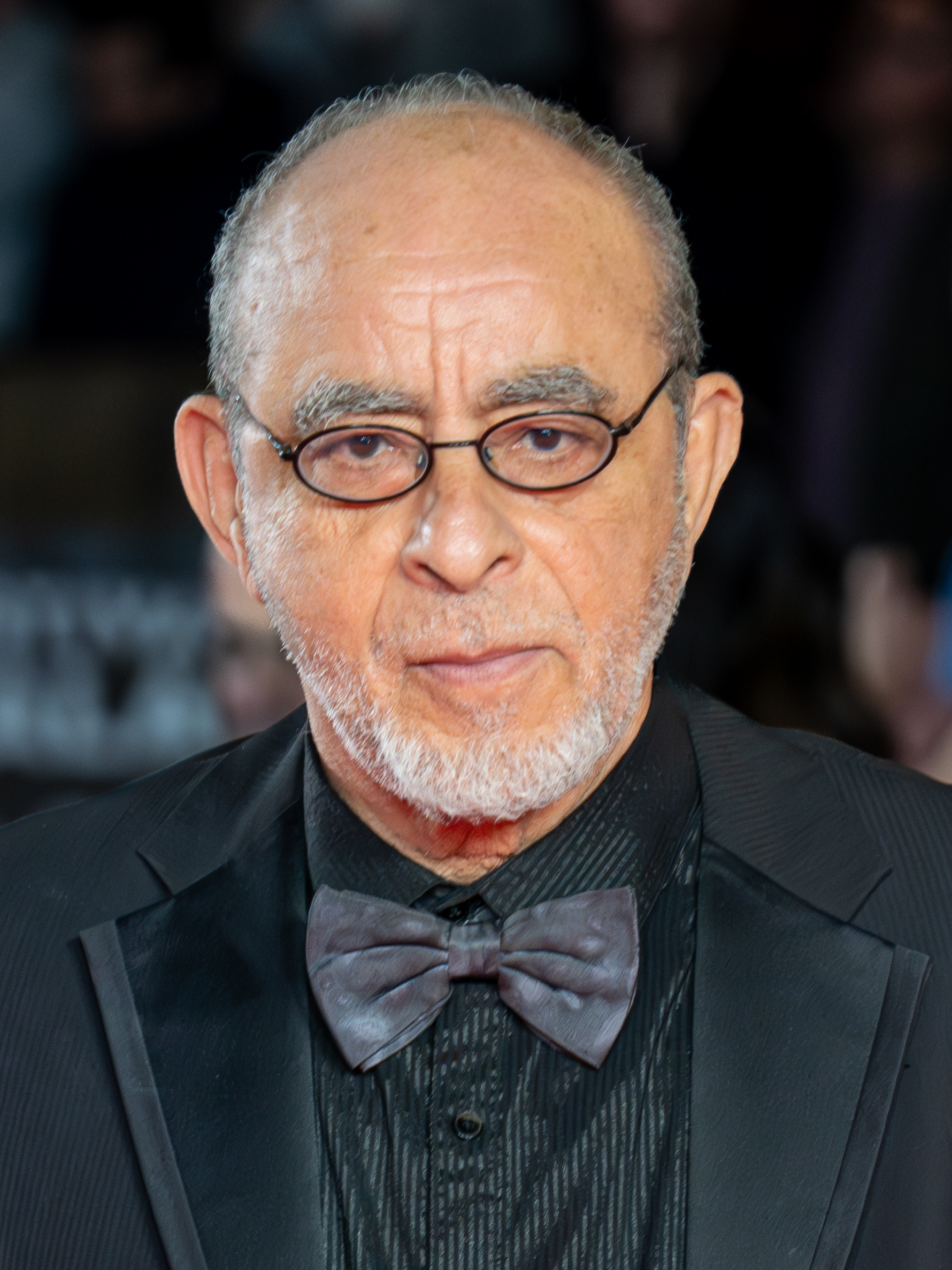
- Boulane in 2026
- Born: 1 January 1956 (age 70); Salé, Morocco
- Occupation: Film maker
- Known for: l'enfant terrible du cinéma marocain
- Notable work: Ali, Rabiaa et les autres… (2001); Les Anges de Satan (2007)

Ahmed Boulane (born 1 January 1956 in Salé, Morocco) is a Moroccan film director, producer and screenplay writer. Known as l'enfant terrible du cinéma marocain for his antics with journalists and his fellow filmmakers, he is considered to be one of the most talented directors in Morocco.

== Biography ==
After a stint working in theater and radio as an actor in Morocco and then living in Italy, he returned to Morocco where he worked for 25 years in various positions in the film industry: actor, location manager, production manager, casting director and first assistant director. He was first assistant director in more than fifty international feature films for renowned directors, such as Giuliano Montaldo, Carlo Di Palma, Alan J. Pakula, Philippe de Broca, Jean Delannoy and John Landis, among others.

His first short film, Voyage dans le passé received the prestigious Vatican award at the 7th Milan African Film Festival and launched his dream of a becoming a feature film director.

His first feature film, Ali, Rabiaa and the Others was removed from movie theaters a few days after its release, considered too controversial for Morocco, but he won several international awards for this project.

Despite a chaotic production where permits were refused at the last minute by certain Moroccan administrations, his second feature film, The Satanic Angels, was first at the box office in Morocco in 2008, ahead of films like Harry Potter and 300.

His most recent films are The Return of the Son in 2011, and La Isla, a co-production with Spain released in 2016.

In 2019 Ahmed Boulane published his first book Ma vie est belle, translated into English by Dana Schondelmeyer (What a Beautiful Life), a memoir of his childhood, adolescence and early twenties.

In 2019 he was nominated as the head of the grand jury for the Golden Movie Awards Africa.

== Filmography ==
- 1990: Plateau idéal (director)
- 1990: Crime imparfait (director)
- 1993: Adopte-moi (director)
- 1996: Voyage dans le passé (director, producer, screenplay writer)
- 2000: Ali, Rabiaa and the Others... (director, producer, screenplay writer)
- 2001: Midnight Fly (co-producer)
- 2002: Fetching Water and Go karts (director)
- 2002: Casablanca, Casablanca (co-screenplay writer)
- 2003: Moi, ma mère et Betina (director, screenplay writer)
- 2007: The Satanic Angels (director, producer, screenplay writer)
- 2011: The Return of the Son (director, producer, screenplay writer)
- 2015: La Isla (director, producer, screenplay writer)

Actor

- 1977: Al Kanfoudi by Nabyl Lahlou
- 1979: Le Gouverneur général by Nabyl Lahlou
- 1981: Rollover by Alan J. Pakula
- 1982: Al Jamra by Farida Bourquia
- 1983: Afghanistan pourquoi ? by Abdellah Mesbahi
- 1985: Ishtar by Elaine May
- 1987: Deadline by Richard Stroud
- 1988: Der Aufsteiger by Peter Kevilc
- 1989: 1001 Nights by Philippe de Broca
- 1990: Un submarí a les estovalles by Ignasi P. Ferré
- 1992: L'Enfant lion by Patrick Grandperret
- 1993: Enfance volée by Hakim Noury
- 1994: Marie de Nazareth by Jean Delannoy
- 1994: King David by Robert Markowitz
- 1996: Aouchtam by Mohamed Ismaïl
- 1997: Di cielo in cielo by Roberto Giannarelli
- 1997: Solomon by Roger Young
- 1997: Marrakech Express by Gillies MacKinnon
- 1998: The Seventh Scroll by Kevin Connor
- 1999: Passeur d'enfants by Franck Apprederis
- 2000: Ali, Rabiaa and the Others... by Ahmed Boulane
- 2001: Le Piano by Lahcen Zinoun
- 2002: Casablanca, Casablanca by Farida Benlyazid
- 2003: Jawhara by Saâd Chraïbi
- 2004: Story of One by Nick Murphy
- 2005: Suspect by Mohamed Caghat
- 2006: The Satanic Angels by Ahmed Boulane
- 2007: Al Kadia by Nour-Eddine Lakhmari
- 2007: Whatever Lola Wants by Nabil Ayouch
- 2008: Cicatrice by Mehdi Salmi
- 2011: The Return of the Son by Ahmed Boulane
- 2013: Prisoners of the Sun by Roger Christian
- 2015: La Isla by Ahmed Boulane
- 2016: Julie - Aicha by Ahmed El Maanouni
- 2017: Razzia by Nabil Ayouch
- 2018: Instinto by Carlos Sedes
- 2019: The Spy by Raf Gideon
- 2020: Los Favoritos of Mida by Mateo Gil
- 2020: Rauhantekijä by Antti jussi Annilla
- 2021: " Bab Labhar TV series by Chawki Laoufir
- 2022: Los frad TV Series by Mariano Barroso
- 2025: Calle Malaga by Maryam Touzani

== Awards ==
Voyage dans le passé

- 1997: 2nd prize Vatican Award - 7th Milan African Film Festival, Milan, Italy
- 1998: Special Jury Mention - 5th National Moroccan Film Festival, Casablanca, Morocco

Ali, Rabiaa and the Others

- 2000: Best First Film - 6th National Moroccan Film Festival, Marrakech, Morocco
- 2000: Journalists' Award - 6th National Moroccan Film Festival, Marrakech, Morocco
- 2000: Best Editing - 6th National Moroccan Film Festival, Marrakech, Morocco
- 2001: Best Supporting Actor - 6th National Moroccan Film Festival, Marrakech, Morocco
- 2001: Best Supporting Actor - Alexandria Film Festival, Alexandria, Egypt
- 2002: Special Jury Mention - Avança International Film Festival, Avança, Portugal

The Satanic Angels

- 2007: Best Music - 6th National Moroccan Film Festival, Tangier, Morocco
- 2008: Jury's Award - Avança International Film Festival, Avança, Portugal

The Return of the Son

- 2012: Best Director - International Film Festival of Cinema and Migration, Utrecht, Netherlands
- 2012: Coup du Coeur - 12th Marrakech International Film Festival, Marrakech, Morocco

La Isla

- 2015: Coup du Coeur - 15th Marrakech International Film Festival, Marrakech, Morocco
- 2016: Jury's Award - Helsinki African Film Festival, Helsinki, Finland
- 2017: Best Comedy - Cordoba International Film Festival, Cordoba, Columbia
- 2017: Young Jury's Award - Angers African Film Festival, Angers, France
