= Mustapha Tabet =

Executed Moroccan serial rapist

Hajj Mustapha Tabet
- مصطفى ثابت
- Tabet during his sentencing, 1993
- Born: Mohamed Mustapha Tabet; 1939; Casablanca, French Morocco
- Died: September 5, 1993 (aged 54); Maâmora, Kenitra, Morocco
- Cause of death: Execution by firing squad
- Education: Royal Police Institute of Kenitra
- Organization: Renseignements Généraux
- Children: 5
- Criminal charges: Indecent assault, defloration, rape with violence, abduction, false imprisonment of a married woman, acts of barbarism and incitement to debauchery, falsification and destruction of evidence
- Penalty: Death

Details
- Victims: 518 confirmed (up to 1,200; 1,500 confessed)

Mohamed Mustapha Tabet (Arabic: محمد مصطفى ثابت, 1939 – September 5, 1993), known by his nickname Hajj Policier (Arabic: حاج سليمان) or Hajj Tabet (Arabic: الحاج ثابت), was a Moroccan serial rapist and former police commissioner who was involved in the kidnapping, rapes and assaults of more than 518 girls and women in his Casablanca apartment from 1986 to 1993.

The case became one of the most egregious examples of police corruption and sexual abuse in the country, as Tabet used his status to dismiss and cover-up evidence of his crimes. He was eventually convicted and sentenced to death in March 1993, and was subsequently executed by firing squad in September. As of 2026, Tabet remains the last person to be executed in Morocco.

== Early life and career ==
Mohamed Mustapha Tabet was born the son of a Quranic teacher in 1939 in Casablanca, Morocco. After graduating high school in 1960, he worked as an Arabic teacher in a small school in Beni Mellal where he rapidly got promoted to headmaster before resigning. He returned to Casablanca and enrolled in the Royal Police Academy in Kenitra in 1974.

Tabet entered the Renseignements Généraux (RG), Morocco's police intelligence agency, in 1975. In 1976, he was promoted to commissioner, during which he assaulted his first known victim. The girl had jumped from Tabet's first-floor apartment window before he was able to abuse her. In 1982, he was the head of the RG in Ben M'sick – Sidi Othmane before being relocated to Aïn Sebaâ – Hay Mohammadi. By 1989, he had become the head of the Casablanca bureau of the RG.

He gained the reputation of a highly-religious man, and gained the nickname of Hajj Tabet following his pilgrimage to Mecca. According to a victim, he reportedly interrupted his rapes after hearing the call to prayer, and continued raping the woman after praying. Tabet had also gained infamy amongst locals due to the numerous complaints lodged against him, predominantly by young women and girls, that he had approached them in his car, kidnapped and raped them at his apartment.

Tabet had two wives and had five children. It was reported by TelQuel that Tabet often had depressive episodes, and an inferiority complex. Tabet allegedly felt a need to prove his masculinity.

== Crimes ==
According to an indictment filed against Tabet, he admitted to "[regularly having gone] to the gates of schools, faculties, or simply walked the main boulevards" with the sole aim of "hunting his prey". Once his victims were in his car, he would take them directly to his apartment, where the girls gave themselves up, willingly or unwillingly, to his overflowing sexual appetite. He made no distinction between married and single women, virgins and non-virgins. The indictment noted a specific incident where Tabet allegedly raped three women from the same family; a mother, her daughter, and her 15-year-old niece.

Tabet had filmed most of his assaults, confessing to having spent over 5,000 dirham per month on prostitutes, male and female, and producing videotapes which he allegedly sold overseas. In some of the tapes, Tabet was seen physically abusing and beating the women, in some instances with blood being abundantly visible.

Tabet used his position to cover-up his crimes, and his colleagues in the police force often destroyed any evidence to prevent charges being brought against him. Tabet told his victims that he could get them hymenorrhaphy the next day from a co-conspirator, gynecologist Driss Lahlou, assuring the victims they would be able to "keep their virginity". Lahlou and three police commissioners involved in the cover-up were later sentenced.

== Arrest and investigation ==
In 1990, a woman and her girlfriend were reported to have filed a complaint for rape and kidnapping to local police in the Hay Mohammadi district of Casablanca against someone calling themselves "Hajj Hamid". Police found inconsistencies in the story, the women admitted that they were not kidnapped. "Hajj Hamid" allegedly told the women that the act was videotaped and promised to give them a copy by Eid al-Fitr. "Hajj Hamid" was quickly identified as Mustapha Tabet by policemen, however, it was discovered Tabet was the investigating officer's supervisor. Police officers tried to convince the women to drop charges, to no avail. The women filed another complaint at a different police station, only for the complaint to be ignored.

In August 1992, a Moroccan student in Milan identified a person resembling his sister while watching a pornographic video cassette with his friends. The student traveled back to Casablanca the next day to inquire about the matter. After discussing the video with his family, he learned that his sister had met an individual who called themselves Hajj in 1991. The student subsequently located Hajj's residence and attempted to meet his sister there. Upon seeing his sister enter the house, he was promptly arrested and detained.

Following his release the next day, the student rented a new car and "kidnapped" his sister en route to Hajj's house. He recorded his sister's confession and her version of the events. As an Italian citizen, he sent the videotape to the Italian embassy, which subsequently passed it on to the Prime Minister's office. Prime Minister Abdellatif Filali received a copy of the video and forwarded it to the King Hassan II. The King, who was already considering police reform, ordered an immediate investigation in response to the video. Consequently, a secret investigation cell was established by the Royal Gendarmerie to conduct further inquiries.

On February 2, 1993, the Royal Gendarmerie, without informing the police and without a warrant, decided to raid Tabet's house. During the raid, they found and seized two remote control video cameras, two microphones hidden under the bed, identity cards of women, cocaine, 118 video tapes featuring victims having intercourse with Tabet, sometimes with other men, and a list consisting of the names and addresses of dozens of women on Tabet's computer.

Tabet was taken into custody after four days as a fugitive for interrogation and was allegedly subject to torture and beatings. His wife and children, who lived in another house, denied any knowledge of his crimes. The Royal Gendarmerie counted 518 victims, but speculated that the number of victims could be as high as 600-1,200, including minors. The Public Prosecutor of Casablanca later described the tapes as "[...] not only pornographic recordings, but the most horrific recordings in the history of humanity", while Moroccan press named the case "one of the worst examples of police corruption and cover-ups in the country's history".

He had edited the tapes, as he had filmed multiple angles of his rapes, and also created a compilation of what he considered to be the best parts of his collection; the tape was numbered 32. Tape no. 32 was alleged to contain several Moroccan notables, high-ranking officers and politicians raping his victims. The contents of the tape officially remain unknown.

== Trial and conviction ==
Verdicts

- Death Sentence
  - Mohamed Mustapha Tabet
- Life
  - Ahmed Ouachi (pardoned after 7 years)
- 20 years
  - Abdeslam Bekkali
- 10 years
  - Mustapha Ben Maghnia
  - Abdelkader Dou Ennaïm
  - Abdellatif Boussaïri
  - Abdelhadi M'rini (pardoned after 3 years)
- 3 years
  - Aziz Sebbar
  - Abdallatif Abbad
  - Abderrahim Bouddi
  - Lahsen Jâafari
  - Zouhair Fïkri
  - Mustapha Aït Si
  - Slimane Jouhari
  - Sallam Fedali
- 2 years + 1000 dirham fine
  - Driss Lahlou

— Source:

On February 18, 1993, Tabet's trial started. The trial was held in camera during Ramadan, and he was charged with "indecent assault, defloration, rape with violence, abduction, and sequestration of a married woman, acts of barbarism and incitement to debauchery, falsification and destruction of evidence" in front of the Criminal Chamber of the Court of Appeal in Casablanca.

Prosecution was led by Noureddine Riahi who requested the death penalty. The judge was Lahcen Tolfi, and Tabet was represented by Mohamed Afrit Bennani. Bennani claimed that his client "is not a criminal. He is perhaps unwell. He may as well even be a sick man. He has powerful urges. He needs sex more than many men. Sometimes for four or five hours a day. For a 54-year-old man, I admit that is unusual. But that does not make him a criminal". Benanni also justified the violence seen on the tapes as "normal rough sex, which some women like".

The defense's strategy was to prove that Tabet was physically unable to have 518 sexual relations in 3 years, and tried to portray Tabet as mentally ill and claimed he was possessed by a jinn, the jinn being the one pushing Tabet to do the "incomprehensible acts". Tabet was deemed able to stand trial after being evaluated by a court-appointed psychiatrist.

The trial was described by witnesses as "a hasty trial where the commissioner was constantly summoned to keep quiet". Tape no. 32 was not admitted as evidence and was allegedly destroyed. When a police commissioner brought up the tape no. 32 at Tabet's trial, it caused "indescribable panic within the court and the judge kept inevitably adjourned the session". However, Tabet insisted that the jury see tape no. 32.

At his trial, he admitted to the authenticity of the tapes, claimed that he had intercourse with up to 1,500 women and that at least 10 of the city's supervisors and other senior police officers had aided in destroying evidence, despite this, Tabet argued that the victims were either willing participants or prostitutes. All 118 tapes that were found at the raid were screened at the courtroom except for tape no. 32. During a 6-hour long screening of one of the videos, a lawyer fainted and had to be taken to a hospital.

The trial was highly criticized and denounced. Excerpts of the trial were broadcast by Al-Aoula, the biggest public TV channel in Morocco.

On March 15, 1993, Mustapha Tabet was found guilty on all charges and sentenced to death by firing squad. 30 other accomplices were sentenced from 5 months to 20 years in prison. Tabet's superior officer, Ahmed Ouachi, received a life sentence, but received a royal pardon in 2000. Tabet's father disowned him after the verdict. Islamic fundamentalist groups denounced the verdict, demanding death by stoning or crucifixion rather than firing squad. A march was held after the verdict denouncing sexual assault in Rabat.

== Execution ==
On September 5, 1993, six months after his trial, at Kenitra Central Prison, Tabet was woken up by the call to Fajr prayer. After praying, he was taken by Gendarmes to a car under the pretext that he would be transferred to another detention center, instead, he was taken to a forest area and tied to a pole. A magistrate approved his execution on the spot and asked Tabet to recite the Shahada, the Islamic testimony of faith. Four snipers from the Auxiliary Forces aimed their rifles at Tabet.

A magistrate asked Tabet for any last words, Tabet replied with "I am condemned for things that everyone else does. Except that the people who were sentenced with me have nothing to do with this story!" Snipers shot at Tabet in rapid succession, and he was later declared dead by a pathologist on scene. He was the first person to be executed in Morocco since 1982.

His family was not allowed to witness the execution. Tabet's family received his body 48 hours later in a coffin that was sealed shut, and the family refused to get Tabet's body inspected by independent medical examiners. As of 2026, he remains the last person to be executed in Morocco.

== Legacy ==
Tabet is buried in Achelh Cemetery, Casablanca. A movie directed by Nabyl Lahlou, Tabite or not Tabite, was based out of Tabet's trial. Tabet's widow, Malika Abbassi, expressed her intent to sue Lahlou. Lahlou dismissed Abbassi by saying "if [Abbassi] sues me, she will do me a great service because I will be able to go from the anonymity that has always pursued me to finally become famous".

== See also ==
- List of serial rapists
- Tabite or not Tabite
- Lavrentiy Beria, Soviet secret police leader who raped numerous women
