= Ayouch =

Ayouch is a surname. Notable people with the surname include:

- Amal Ayouch (born 1966), Moroccan actress
- Nabil Ayouch (born 1969), French-Moroccan television and film director, producer and writer
- Noureddine Ayouch (born 1945), Moroccan social activist and businessman
