= Ophélie n'est pas Morte =

French-language drama written by Nabyl Lahlou

Ophélie n'est pas Morte or Ophelia Is Not Dead is a drama written originally in French in 1968 by Moroccan actor and director Nabyl Lahlou. The play is based on the characters of two dramas by Shakespeare, Hamlet and Macbeth, however the storyline is put in a contemporary setting and revolves around the concepts of censorship, identity, and artistic freedom in a post-colonised world from the perspective of the oppressed, with a lot of references to Morocco. There is an underlying stagnation, an “impasse” as Lahlou refers to it, which affects the characters throughout the play.

== Characters ==
There are only two characters in the play, but contrary to what the title would imply, none of them is Ophelia, but Hamlet and Macbeth. Ophelia does not appear directly in the play, but she is introduced as a servant and a prostitute from the very beginning.

== Plot ==
Opposing to the Shakespearean traditions, the play only consists of two acts that follow each other in a repeating sequence, instead of five. In each act, there are multiple micro-drama scenes. The protagonists of Shakespeare's Hamlet and Macbeth are becoming actors who played their own role, in Lahlous’ play. They are stripped from their past roles and magnificence. The characters are voluntarily paralysed, and in constant need of a crutch or a wheelchair. The setting is always a confined space that resonates with the impasse of the characters: a room, hospital, prison cell, radio station or a theatre stage. Lahlou's play takes place ten years after the characters get to know each-other, playing their role in Shakespeare plays. Another thirty year passes between the two acts. Act one lets us see into the actors’ confinement. Act two reveals to us how this has come to be. By the end Hamlet stays completely alone, not even sure who he is anymore, lamenting on a life spent waiting for the return of Ophelia, and something to change. The absurdity of the play, and motif of waiting can remind the audience of Samuel Becketts Waiting for Godot.

== Director ==
Nabyl Lahlou was born in Fes, Morocco in 1945. He gained wide recognition with his play Ophélie n’est pas morte and became famous in the Moroccan theatre in 1970.

== Themes ==
=== The crisis of belonging ===
The plot shines a light on the difficulties of post-colonial Arab identity searching. The conflict of belonging to two separate countries, nationalities, languages, and cultures is the director's main theme in this play. The concept of nation is distorted as Macbeth mistakenly evokes his own country's flag, here the national flag is sacrificed in favour of the French flag. The question of identity is presented in an ironic way. Not only that, but he sarcastically outlined the sufferance of a migrant coming to Europe and seen as a second-class citizen. Not only that, but he sarcastically outlined the sufferance of a migrant coming to Europe and seen as a second-class citizen, having to carry out shameful and dishonouring activities, and not being accepted as an equal human being, coming with his cultural differences. Furthermore, Lahlou dispensed an intense criticism on Africans coming to Europe in order to search for freedom and knowledge, comparing them to dogs who need to follow their masters.

As we can witness from the scene:

“MACBETH: I would be the captain of the national team. My players would wear blue-white-and-red stripes, and we would...

HAMLET: But that is the French flag!

MACBETH: The French flag...? French flag? You do not see anything but the French flag? Eh? Have you got any idea what the color of your own flag is? French flag! Is it possible that we have gone so downhill. Since the fall of Granada, since the arrival of the colonialists? French flag! There, where our ancestors used to live as conquerors, as civilized people, as masters, and look at us returning as road sweepers, cleaners, thieves, traffickers, and prostitutes, and we are beaten up. French Flag! And while the slaughters go on, what do you do? You paint! You paint and what do you paint? Stains? Signs and colors? Color! Do you know what color means? And you have not still

found your color. Blood. What is it in your opinion? It is not a colour as you think. I will tell you: blood is a colour which can be achieved only once every half a C century. Stop giggling! AH! I can feel it. It is moving! The town is no longer white. Shame covers the walls. The town is no longer a virgin, and in its womb a revolt growls and around this revolt wolves are ready to be released. And while your mother suffers miserably, what do you do? You paint! You dream! You dream of love, of women, of sex, of pleasure, of luxury, of joy, you dream of asses and indifference. You never dream of revolution. Stop giggling!”

=== Play-within-a-play ===
In the second act of “Ophelia Is Not Dead” there is a powerful play-within-a-play scene. The act starts out with Macbeth as a psychoanalyst and Hamlet as a client, trying to remember the cause of his paralysis. During their session he recalls, befitting of Lahlou's play. Hamlet finds himself in prison as a result of the events. However, he can remember.

=== Oppression of opinion ===
In the radio scene, Lahlou projects the repression and oppression of one's opinions in the Arab world, especially in Morocco since the radio is owned by the government and not everything can be diffused. The actors also must face censorship that permeates everything, becoming a solid pilar of the impasse. Among the hurdles, the need for artistic freedom manifests. As it plays out when Hamlet takes the role of an interviewer and Macbeth as a writer and chess player, Hamlet quotes from the writer's last book, which portrays the circumstances of theatre, the values represented, and the lack of opportunities and artistic freedom very harshly and clearly.

== Impact on the Moroccan public ==
According to Lahlou, to create a theatre in the Arab-Muslim world, the requirement of creativity, intelligence and imagination are necessitated. A person needs to be audacious enough to be free of governmental and religious restrictions. The first Arabic-language performance of Ophelia is Not Dead had a significant impact on the Moroccan people. Even though the Moroccan elite, educated, intellectualized, and political chose to be conspicuously absent from the first introduction of the play in the country. The first Ophelia play in Arabic, which came more than 40 years after the original staging in France, had a negative and spiteful reception compared to the one staged in France as the author stated “There was no response in print, and disconcerting silence from the critics, who opted to remain cosy in their sarcophagi, abandonment by the media”, as the former one sparked a plethora of laudatory and positive articles and reviews. Lahlou also added the necessity for abandoning the media which is full of fraud and hoax.

Ophelia Is Not Dead inspired audiences to laugh, think, and enjoy classical Arabic theatre by evoking both wit and pleasure, while liberating it from taboos, fatwas, and other red lines associated with Islam.

== Translation to Arabic ==
Lahlou claims that “Arabic does not adjust to wordplay, puns, sarcasm, or even humour,” despite how stunning, rich, and complex language it is. Lahlou affirms that he could not translate the play word by word, he had to identify the meaning and the concept of each sentence to adjust the world plays in the translation. Lahlou also discussed the French language he used while writing the play, he used a French that he studied in Lycée Moulay Idress in Fes, rather than the French of Descartes or Balzac. Nevertheless, Lahlou asserts the play's translation into Arabic provided it an extraordinary influence both on the political and social fronts.

== Inspiration and the situation where this play was written ==
The play was written in 1969, during Lahlou's recovery from a serious car accident between the route of Rabat and Kenitra. The play was written in the four months his leg's healed, not knowing whether he would be able to walk without crutches ever again.

== Use of obscene language ==
In Lahlou's play there are many instances of using vulgar and slang words. He intended to free the language from everyday restrictions. The choice of language also strongly represents the bitter emotions and the futility towards the nature of the characters’ state. It gives an honest display of pent-up feelings in the characters, in some cases as the only way of revolting against an oppressive censorship. And in some scenes, it accurately portrays the everyday life of the Moroccan citizens.

== See also ==
- Cultural references to Ophelia
