= Amal Ayouch =

Moroccan actress (born 1966)

- Born: 1966 (age 59–60); Casablanca
- Citizenship: Morocco
- Occupation: Actress
- Years active: 1998
- Notable work: Kandisha

Amal Ayouch (born 1966) is a Moroccan actress who since the late 1990s has performed in the French language both on stage and, above all, in film. In January 2015, she was honoured with an award at the African Women's Film Festival in Brazzaville. Ayouch has played a leading role in Morocco's Fondation des arts vivants (Living Arts Foundation).

== Biography ==
Born in Casablanca in 1966, Amal Ayouch showed interest in acting from an early age, performing on stage at high school. When she was 18, she arrived in Montpellier where she studied to become a pharmacist. While at university, in 1987 she joined a theatre group attached to the French literature department.

She began her film career thanks to another pharmacist, Hassan Benjelloun, who gave her an important part in Les Amis d'hier (1998). Soon afterwards, Hakim Noury invited her to star in Destin de Femme together with Rachid El Ouali. Playing a woman who refused to submit to a difficult husband, she contributed to the film's success.

In 1999, she agreed to play a woman of loose morals in Ali Zaoua directed by her cousin Nabil Ayouch. Similar roles followed in Farida Belyazid's Casablanca, Casablanca (2002) and Chassan Benjelloun's Les lèvres du silence (2001) and Farida Belyazid's Casablanca, Casablanca (2002). She went on to star in Driss Chouika's Le jeu de l'amour (2006), allowing her to master a difficult role in intimate scenes with Younes Megri. She has also played in other successful films including Les Anges de Satan (2007).

She appeared in two films directed by Nabil Lahlou, Les années de l'exil (2001) and Tabite or not Tabite (2004). It was also Lahlou who encouraged her to act on the stage, inviting her to appear in his theatrical productions, including Ophélie n’est pas Morte, Les Tortues, Antigone, and En Attendant Godot.

== Filmography ==
=== Cinéma ===
Year	Film	Director	Role	Notes
2017	Palestina	Julio Soto and Mohamed El Badaoui	Ismahan	Spanish production by Ana Rodrigues
2017	Little Horror Movie	Jérôme Cohen Olivar	Mrs Mancherbreuk	
2016	Riad de mes rêves	Zineb Tamourt		short
2015	Les larmes de Satan	Hicham Jebbari	Meriem	
2015	Jérôme Cohen Olivar	Soraya		
2014	Sotto Voce	Kamal Kamal	Fatma	
2013	L'Anniversaire	Latif Lahlou	Ghita	
2012	Derriere-les-portes-fermees	Ahd Bensouda	Najia l’avocate	
2012	Le Retour du fils	Ahmed Boulane	elle-même	short appearance
2011	Rihanna	Mourad El Khaoudi		short
2010	Les ailes de l'amour	Abdelhay Laraki	Hajja Hlima	
2010	Femmes en miroirs	Saad Chraibi	tante Ghita	
2009	Entropya	Yassine Marroccu		short
2008	La Française	Souad El Bouhati	Mme Laktani	
2008	Kandisha	Jérôme Cohen Olivar	Dr Maliki	
2007	Les Anges de Satan	Ahmed Boulane	l’avocate	
2006	Une gazelle dans le vent	Mohamed Hassini		
2006	Le jeu de l'amour	Driss Chouika		
2005	La danse du foetus	Mohamed Mouftakir		short
2004	L'ascenseur	Selma Bargach		short
2004	Good bye Khadija	Kamal Belghmi		short
2004	Tabite or not Tabite	Nabyl Lahlou	Farida Fatmi	
2004	La mer	Rachida Saadi		short
2004	Sang d'encre	Layla Triqui		short
2002	Casablanca Casablanca	Farida Belyazid	Amina	
2001	Les années de l'exil	Nabyl Lahlou	Tamerdokht	
2000	Ali Zaoua	Nabil Ayouch	Ali Zaoua's mother	
2000	Les lèvres du silence	Hassan Benjelloun	Aicha l’institutrice	
1999	Histoire d'une rose	Majid Rchich		
1998	Destin de femme	Hakim Noury	Saida	
1997	Les amis d'hier	Hassan Benjelloun	l'étudiante	
