= Komany =

- Directed by: Nabyl Lahlou
- Written by: Nabyl Lahlou
- Starring: Salim Berrada, Sofia Hadi, Hamidou
- Cinematography: Ali Haloa
- Edited by: Nabyl Lahlou
- Release date: 1989
- Running time: 108 minutes
- Country: Morocco
- Language: Moroccan Arabic

Komany is a 1989 Moroccan film directed by Nabyl Lahlou.

== Synopsis ==
In a country called Lashistan, a dictator rules. A sect wants to overthrow him to seize power and establish a theocracy. Mozad, QBZ chief, proposes to the leaders of the sect to film the president in scenes where he kills, tortures and executes; and in others, where he is engaged in total debauchery. To do so, Mozad introduces the plotters to Komany, and alcoholic actor and a look-alike of the president.

== Cast ==
- Salim Berrada
- Sofia Hadi
- Hamidou
- Rachid Fekkak
- Mohamed Miftah
