= Capture of Oujda (1647) =

1647 battle in Algeria

The Capture of Oujda in 1647 was a battle between the forces of the Alaouite Sharif Sultan Moulay Mohammed and the Turks of Algiers. It led to the capture of the city of Oujda by the Alaouite Sultanate of Tafilalt, then an expanding political force in the Maghreb.

== The course of events ==
After the annexation of Sijilmasa (Note: Castries 1911) and his defeat by the Zawiya Dila'iya in Fez, (Note: الناصري 1906) Muhammad ibn Sharif decided to set his sights on regions under the Ottomans. (Note: Documents pour servir à l'étude du Nord Ouest africain, 1894)

Around 1647, Moulay Mohammed entered the Moulouya River region, reaching the Ankad Plain. He subjugated the tribes there. With their support, he conquered, and then subjugated the Beni Znassen who were at that time under Ottoman control. Returning with booty, he stopped in front of Oujda which was under Ottoman control. Supported by a portion of the population that rejected Ottoman rule, Moulay Mohammed attacked and captured the city, then expelled all Ottoman loyalists from the city.

After this annexation of Oujda and the Oran campaign of 1647, Tafna River became the border between the Alaouite, and the Regency of Algiers for a while.
