= Oujda =

Oujda وجدة (Arabic) ⵓⵊⴷⴰ (Standard Moroccan Tamazight)
- City
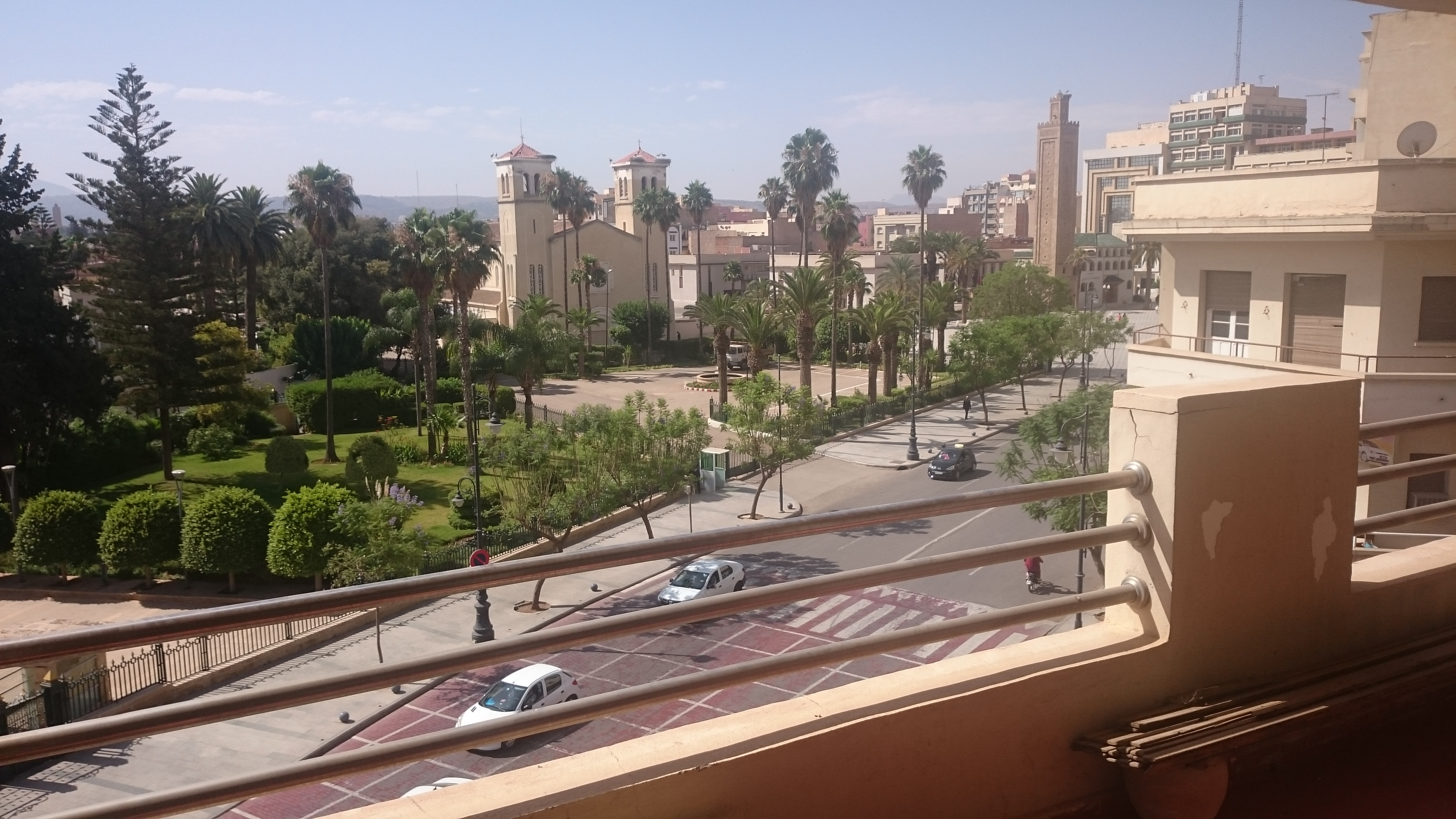
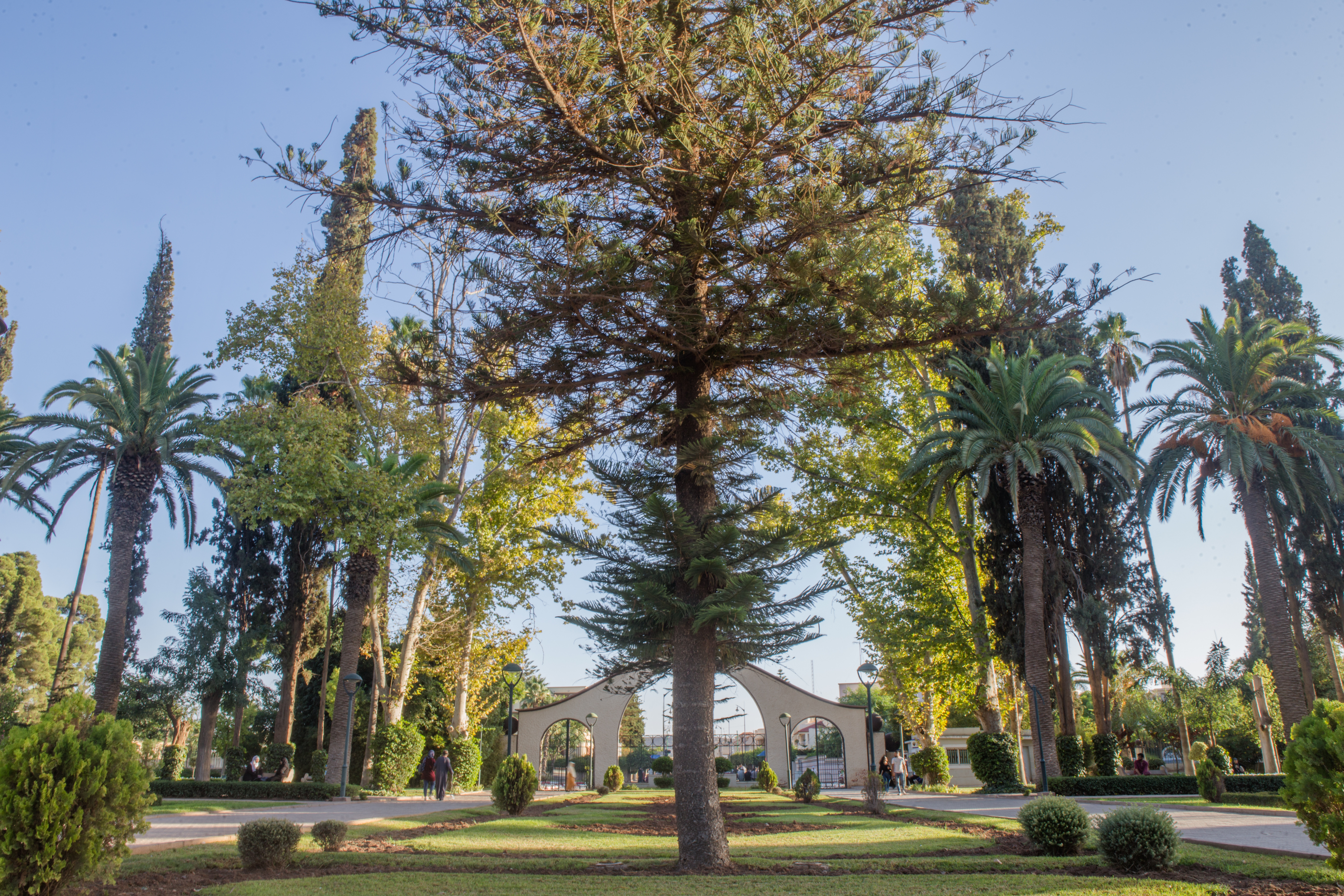
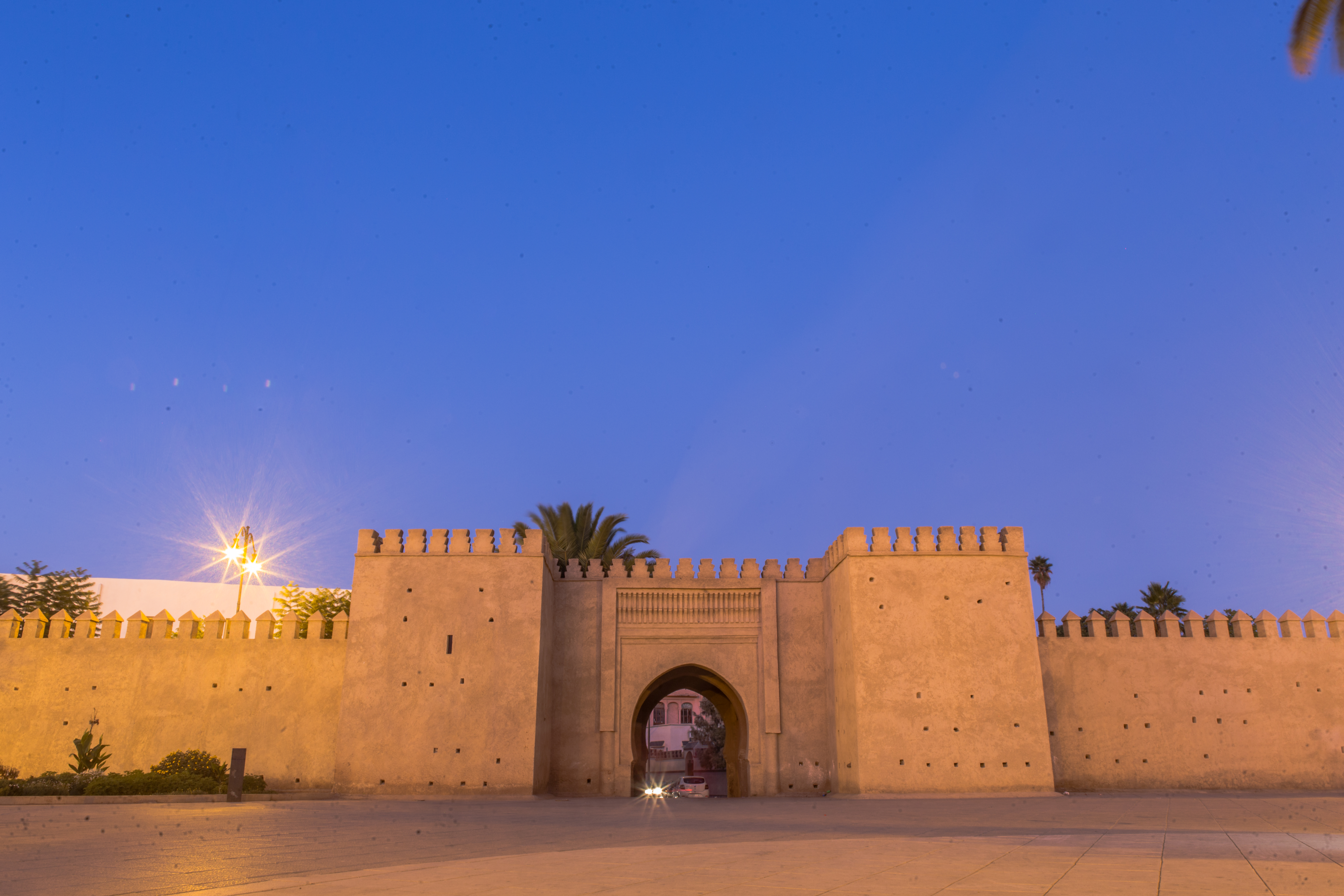
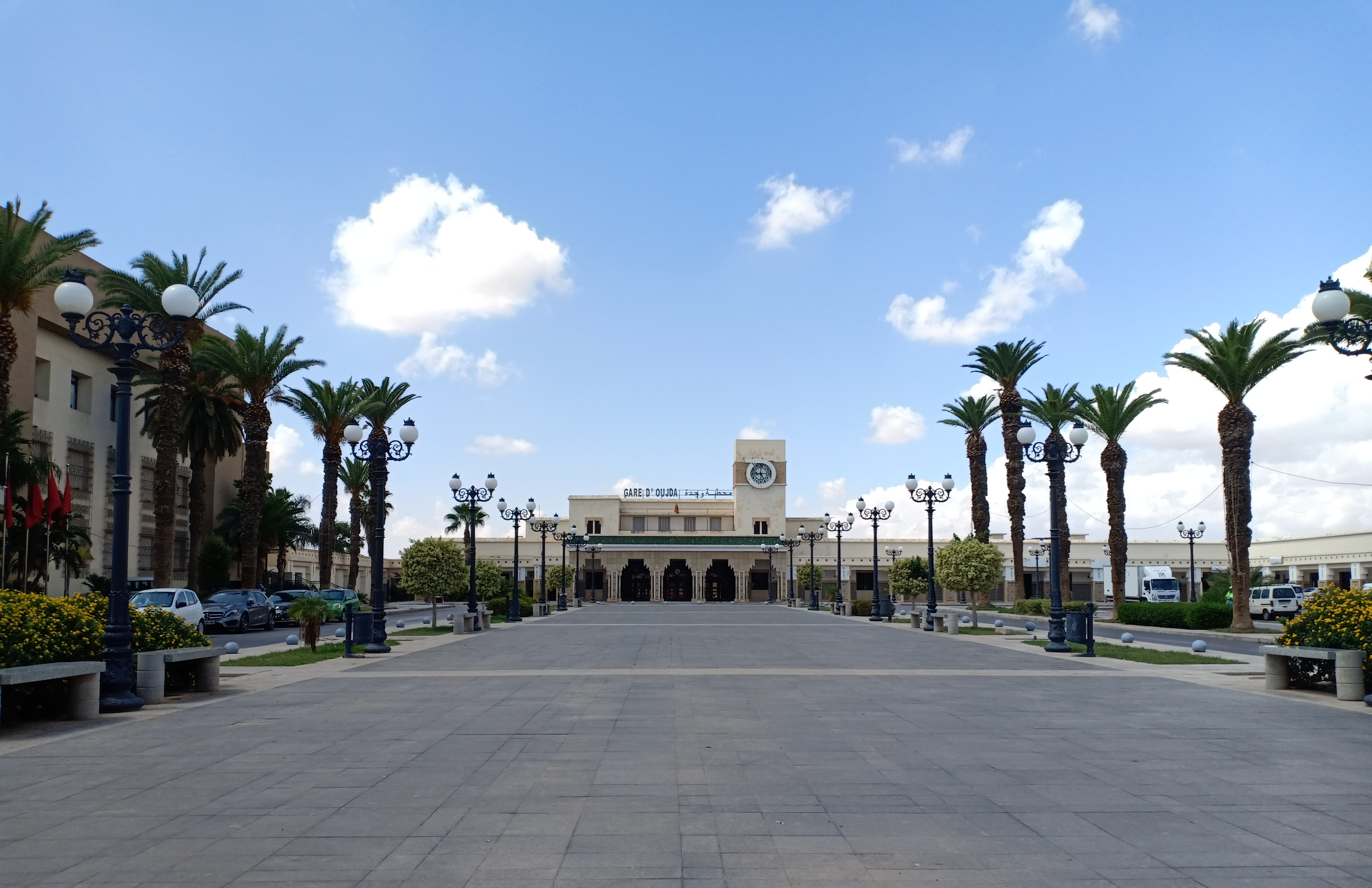
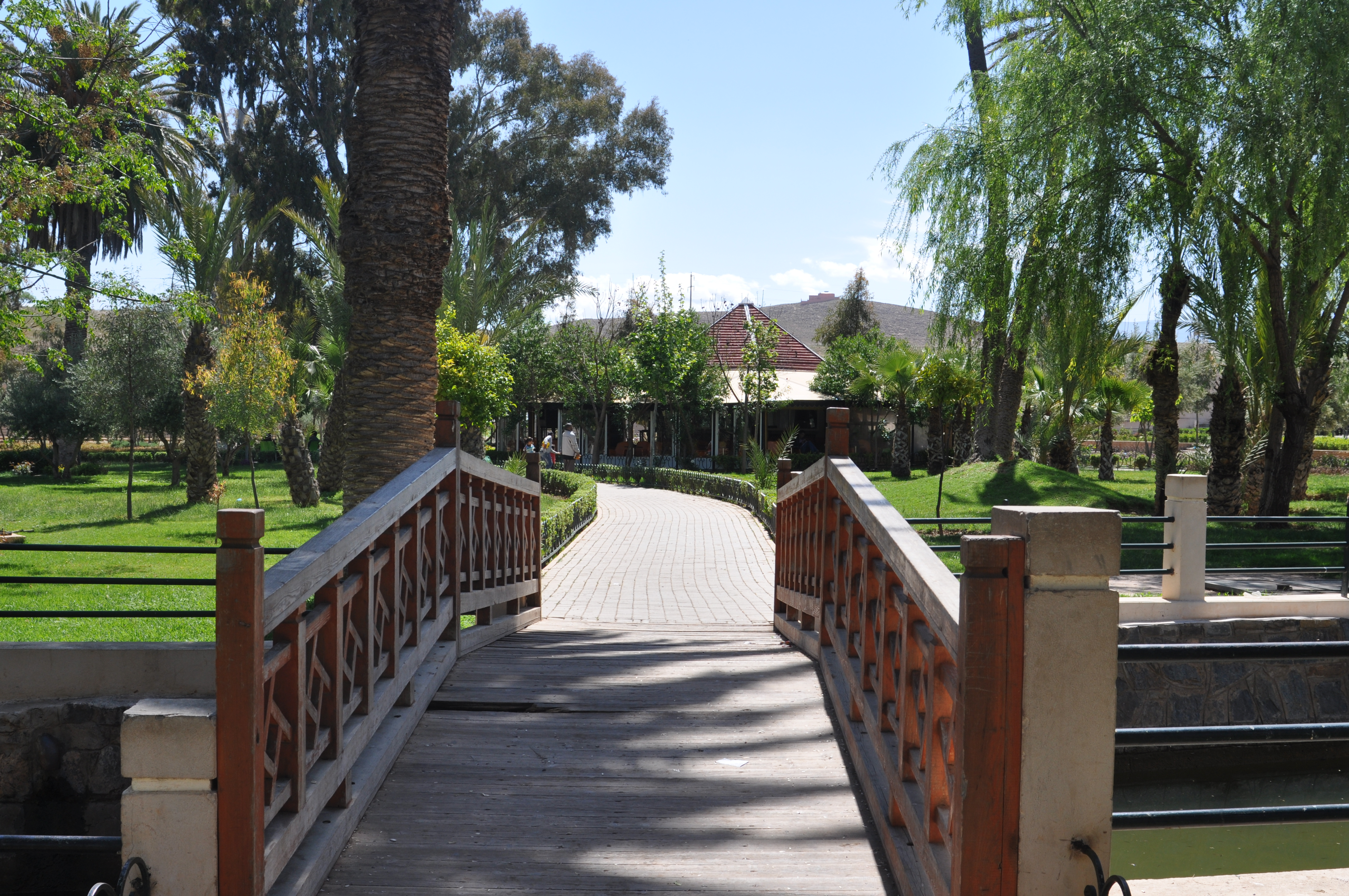

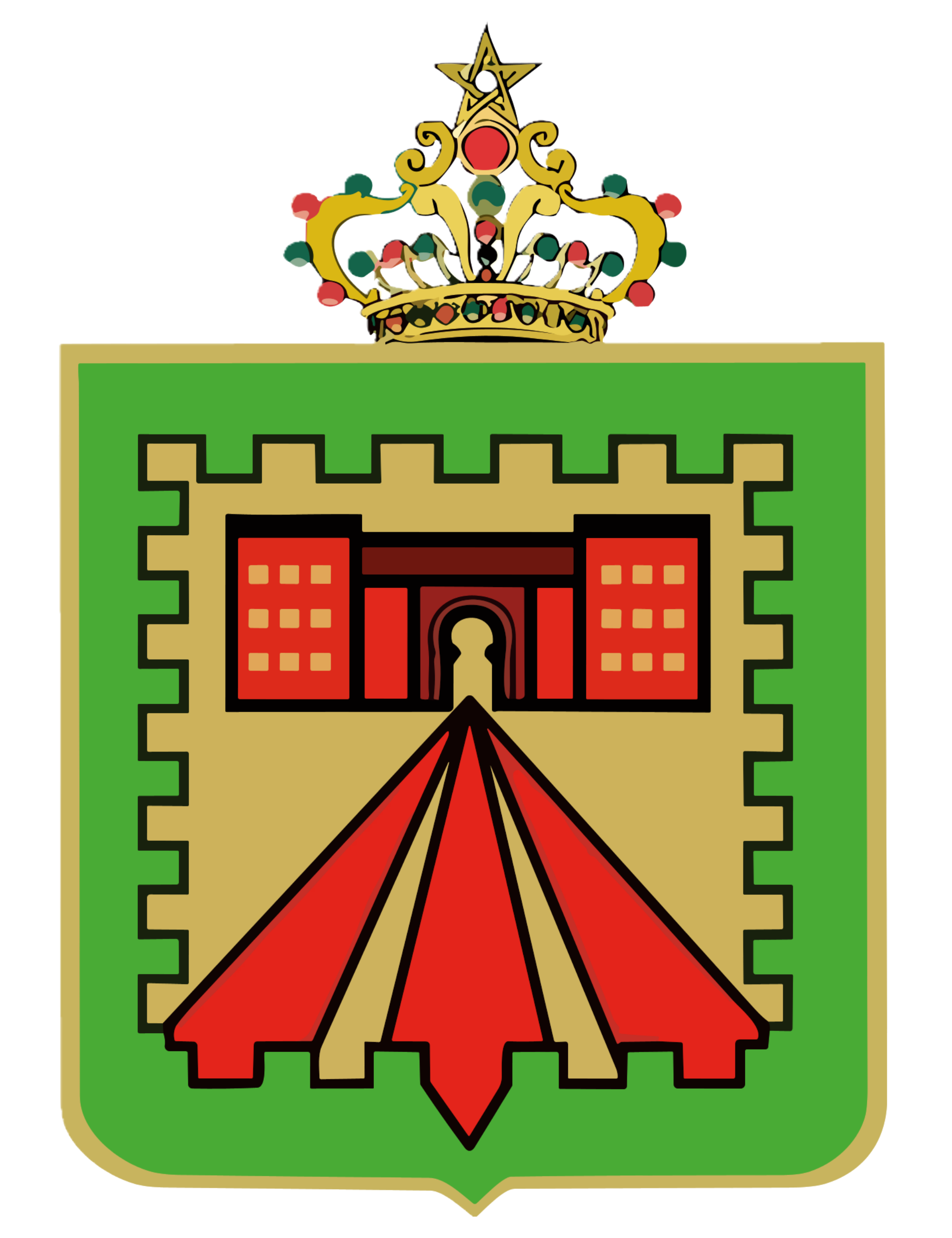
- Coat of arms
- Interactive map of Oujda
- Coordinates: 34°41′12″N 01°54′41″W
- Country: Morocco
- Region: Oriental
- Prefecture: Oujda-Angad Prefecture
- Modern city: 994

Area
  - City: 350 km^{2} (140 sq mi)
- Elevation: 470 m (1,540 ft)

Population (2024)
  - City: 506,224
  - Rank: 9th in Morocco
  - Density: 1,400/km^{2} (3,700/sq mi)
  - Metro: 610,000
- Time zone: UTC+0 (GMT)

Oujda (Note: Arabic: وجدة, romanized: wajda, pronounced [ˈwa(d)ʒda]; Standard Moroccan Tamazight: ⵡⵓⵊⴷⴰ, romanized: Wujda) is a major city in northeast Morocco near the border with Algeria. Oujda is the largest city and capital of the Oriental region of northeastern Morocco and has a population of 506,224 people (2024 census). It is located about 15 kilometres (9 miles) west of the Moroccan-Algerian border in the south of the Beni Iznassen Mountains and about 55 km (34 miles) south of the Mediterranean coast.

== History ==
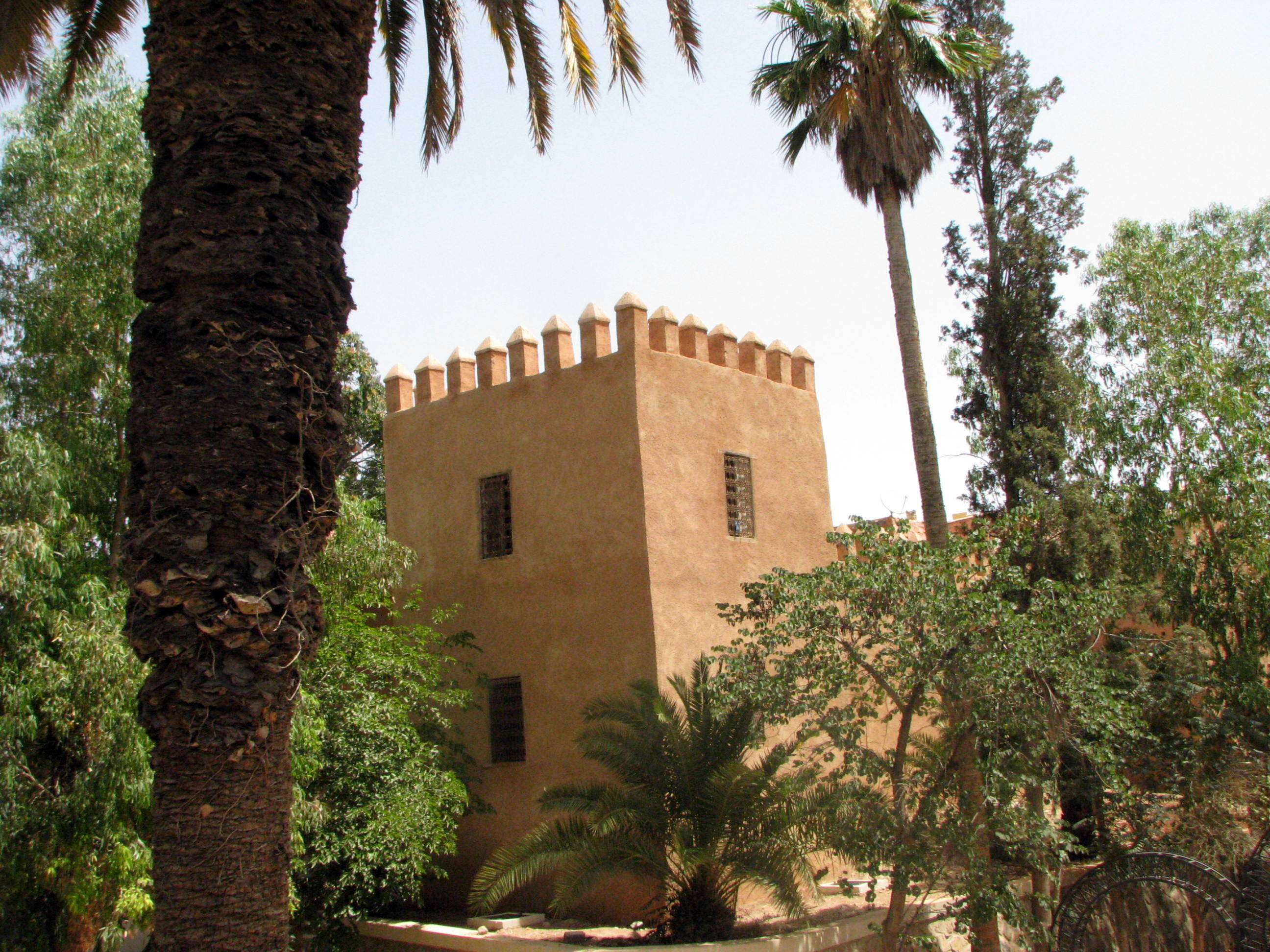
Ancient mirador

=== Origins ===
There is some evidence of a settlement during the Roman occupation, which seems to have been under the control of Berbers rather than Romans.

The city was founded in 994 by Ziri ibn Atiyya, Berber chief of the Zenata Maghrawa tribe. Ziri was, with his tribe, authorized to occupy the region of Fas, but feeling insecure in that region and that town, and wishing to be nearer to the central Maghrib homeland of his tribe, he moved to Oujda, installed there a garrison and his possessions, appointing one of his relatives as governor.

=== 11th to 19th centuries ===
In the mid-11th century, a new quarter with a wall was allegedly added to the primitive core. Yusuf ibn Tashfin occupied the city in 1079, and in the next century, it came under Almohad control, with its fortifications repaired and strengthened under the Almohad caliph Muhammad al-Nasir.

Oujda played an important strategic role between the Marinids, based in Fes, and the Abdalwadids of the Kingdom of Tlemcen. The Marinid sultan Abu Yusuf Yaqub destroyed the city when he defeated Sultan Yaghmorasan in 1271. When his successor Abu Yaqub Yusuf conquered the city again in 1296, he destroyed the remaining fortifications but then rebuilt the town with the new walls, a palace, and a Great Mosque (the current one). The town continued to change hands, however. Around 1325, Sultan Abu al-Hasan took the city again during a series of campaigns which extended Marinid control into the central Maghreb for a brief period.

Because of its frontier position, the city was frequently contested between the Sharifian dynasties of Morocco – the Saadis, followed by the Alaouites – to the west and the Ottoman Empire to the east, from the 16th century onward. It was often attached to the province or region of Tlemcen, which itself also changed hands several times in this period. During the long reign of Moulay Isma'il (1672–1727), Oujda was firmly under Alaouite control and defended by new fortifications and garrisons built by the sultan. After Isma'il's death, however, political instability returned. It was only in 1795 that the city was retaken by the Alaouites and permanently incorporated into Morocco.

The French occupied Oujda in 1844 and again in 1859. To the west of the city is the site of the Battle of Isly which occurred in 1844. In 1907-1908, Oujda was reconquered by General Bugeaud and Marshal Lyautey and used as a French military base to control eastern Morocco. The city's modern infrastructure was initially developed during the French occupation.

=== 20th century and present day ===
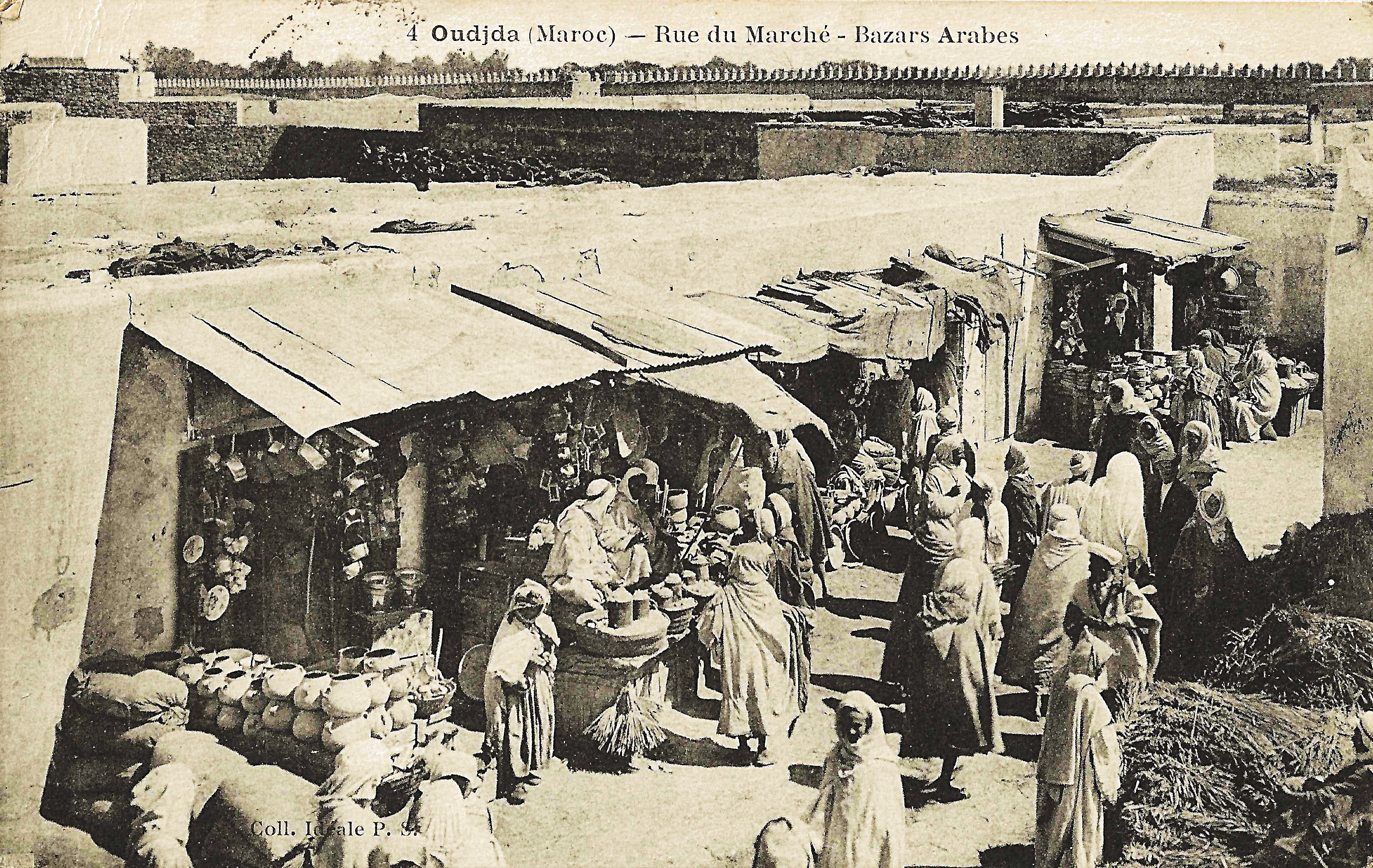
Arab bazaar from Oujda, 1920

Anti-Jewish riots occurred in Oujda June 1948, during the 1948 Palestine war in the aftermath of the establishment of the State of Israel. Oujda, located near the border, was a departure point for Moroccan Jews seeking to reach Israel by crossing into French Algeria; at the time they were not permitted to do so from within Morocco. In the events, 47 Jews and one French person were killed, many were injured, and property was damaged.

During Thami El Glaoui's attempted coup against Sultan Mohammed V, the 1953 Oujda revolt occurred.

From the onset of the Algerian Independence War, in 1954, Morocco allowed Oujda to become the logistic center of the Oujda Group.

The Algeria-Morocco border is just east of Oujda; Maghnia, Algeria sits on the opposite side. Since 1994, the border has been closed.

== Geography ==
The city is located 60 km (37 mi) south of the Mediterranean sea and 15 km (9 mi) west of Algeria, with an estimated altitude of 450 metres (1,476 feet).

Jbel Hamra is 5 km (3 mi) south of city centre; Jbel Hamra is a typical Mediterranean forest; into the east of this forest rests Sidi Maafa park.

Oujda is located in the south of Beni Znassen mountains.

=== Climate ===
The city has a cold semi-arid climate bordering on hot semi-arid climate (Köppen climate classification BSk bordering on BSh). Rainfall is between 300 mm (11.8 in) and 500 mm (19.7 in) per year. It rarely snows in winter; last snowfall was on 7 January 2026. Weather in Oujda is cool but still tepid and wet in winter, hot and dry in summer.

Climate data for Oujda (Oujda Airport) 1991–2020, extremes 1910–present
Month	Jan	Feb	Mar	Apr	May	Jun	Jul	Aug	Sep	Oct	Nov	Dec	Year
Record high °C (°F)	27.9 (82.2)	33.1 (91.6)	35.4 (95.7)	39.5 (103.1)	41.6 (106.9)	44.0 (111.2)	47.3 (117.1)	46.7 (116.1)	42.8 (109.0)	39.4 (102.9)	32.6 (90.7)	31.0 (87.8)	47.3 (117.1)
Mean daily maximum °C (°F)	16.6 (61.9)	17.5 (63.5)	20.1 (68.2)	22.4 (72.3)	26.1 (79.0)	30.5 (86.9)	34.5 (94.1)	34.8 (94.6)	30.2 (86.4)	26.3 (79.3)	20.5 (68.9)	17.5 (63.5)	24.8 (76.6)
Daily mean °C (°F)	10.4 (50.7)	11.3 (52.3)	13.5 (56.3)	15.6 (60.1)	19.0 (66.2)	23.0 (73.4)	26.6 (79.9)	27.1 (80.8)	23.2 (73.8)	19.6 (67.3)	14.5 (58.1)	11.6 (52.9)	17.9 (64.2)
Mean daily minimum °C (°F)	4.3 (39.7)	5.0 (41.0)	6.9 (44.4)	8.7 (47.7)	11.7 (53.1)	15.4 (59.7)	18.7 (65.7)	19.4 (66.9)	16.3 (61.3)	12.9 (55.2)	8.6 (47.5)	5.7 (42.3)	11.1 (52.0)
Record low °C (°F)	−7.1 (19.2)	−4.0 (24.8)	−5.0 (23.0)	−2.4 (27.7)	0.0 (32.0)	4.0 (39.2)	6.0 (42.8)	7.0 (44.6)	5.0 (41.0)	0.0 (32.0)	−0.4 (31.3)	−6.0 (21.2)	−7.1 (19.2)
Average precipitation mm (inches)	31.5 (1.24)	29.9 (1.18)	34.3 (1.35)	32.7 (1.29)	24.3 (0.96)	5.2 (0.20)	1.5 (0.06)	6.4 (0.25)	18.0 (0.71)	27.6 (1.09)	34.0 (1.34)	25.4 (1.00)	270.8 (10.66)
Average precipitation days (≥ 1.0 mm)	4.8	4.3	4.5	4.7	3.2	1.0	0.4	1.2	2.4	3.8	4.6	4.3	39.2
Average relative humidity (%) (at 6:00 am)	83	82	84	87	86	83	76	77	81	85	82	83	82
Mean monthly sunshine hours	197.5	189.9	229.0	249.5	284.6	312.4	333.3	314.1	255.0	227.6	193.6	188.1	2,974.6
Source 1: NOAA (sun 1981–2010)
Source 2: Deutscher Wetterdienst (humidity, 1947–1976), Meteo Climat (record highs and lows)

== Architecture ==
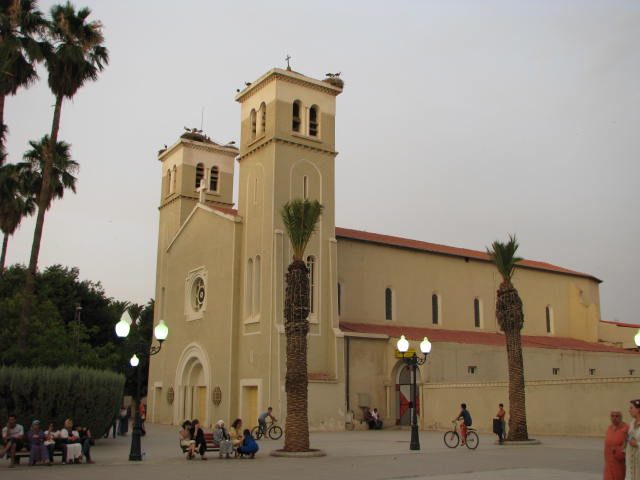
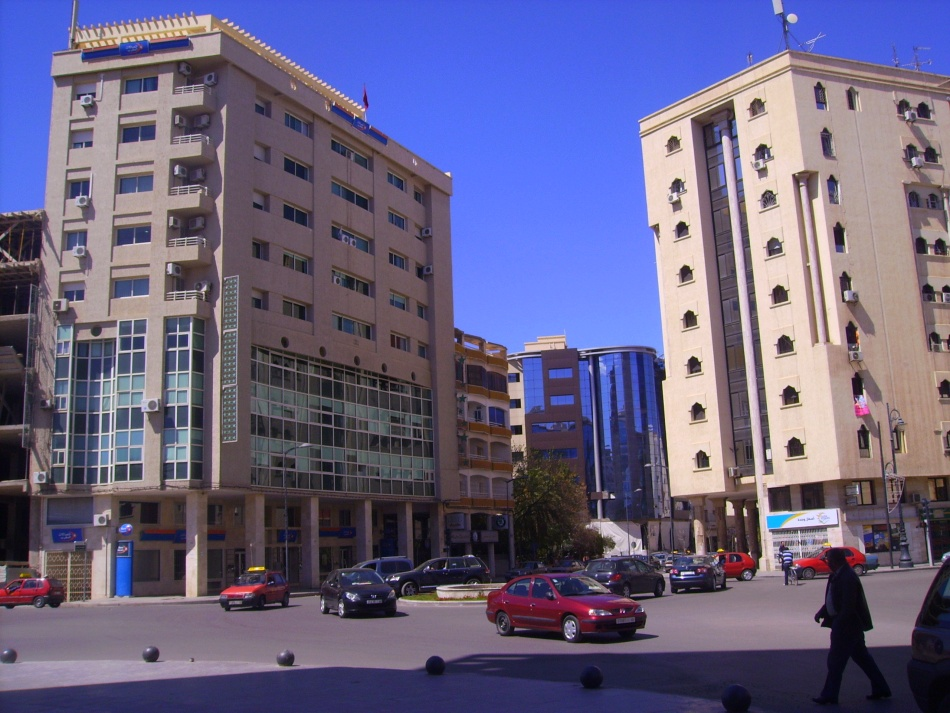
Left: Oujda Church
Right: Oujda, Bd Mohamed V

The main characteristic of the city is having the old city in the centre. The old city maintains traditional features of the Moroccan architecture with its narrow, winding alleys which lead to the houses and markets, such as the jewelry market and the leather market. The Grand Mosque of Oujda is one of its historically most important mosques.

Roman era ruins, called Bled el Gaada, are just outside of Ouijda. The ruins consist of a Roman fort measuring 175 by 210 metres (574 by 689 ft).

== Music ==
Gharnati refers to a variety of Andalusi music, named after the city of Granada. Tlemcen is Gharnati music's traditional centre in the Maghreb; however, the music style has since spread in Morocco, with Oujda being one of its main Moroccan centres. Each year, the city hosts an International Festival of Gharnati Music.

Reggada Music is a major traditional music movement. It is a Moroccan Amazigh ancient musical genre and traditional war dance from the Beni Znassen/Aït Iznasen tribes of north-east Morocco (Provinces of Oujda, Berkane and Taourirt), more precisely coming from the village called Ain-Reggada. This dance used to celebrate and emulate victory of a battle. This music has now become part of the global music sphere.

== Subdivisions ==
Wilaya building

The province is divided administratively into the following:

Name	Geographic code	Type	Households	Population (2004)	Foreign population	Moroccan population	Notes
Bni Drar	411.01.11.	Municipality	1648	8919	57	8862	
Naïma	411.01.19.	Municipality	218	1151	0	1151	
Oujda	411.01.23.	Municipality	82128	400738	2700	398038	
Ahl Angad	411.07.01.	Rural commune	2897	16494	113	16381	
Ain Sfa	411.07.03.	Rural commune	837	5082	5	5077	
Bni Khaled	411.07.05.	Rural commune	1231	7104	30	7074	
Bsara	411.07.07.	Rural commune	317	1922	1	1921	
Isly	411.07.09.	Rural commune	4262	23896	24	23872	
Mestferki	411.07.11.	Rural commune	797	4832	0	4832	
Sidi Boulenouar	411.07.17.	Rural commune	516	3526	0	3526	
Sidi Moussa Lemhaya	411.07.19.	Rural commune	563	3436	0	3436	

== Transport ==
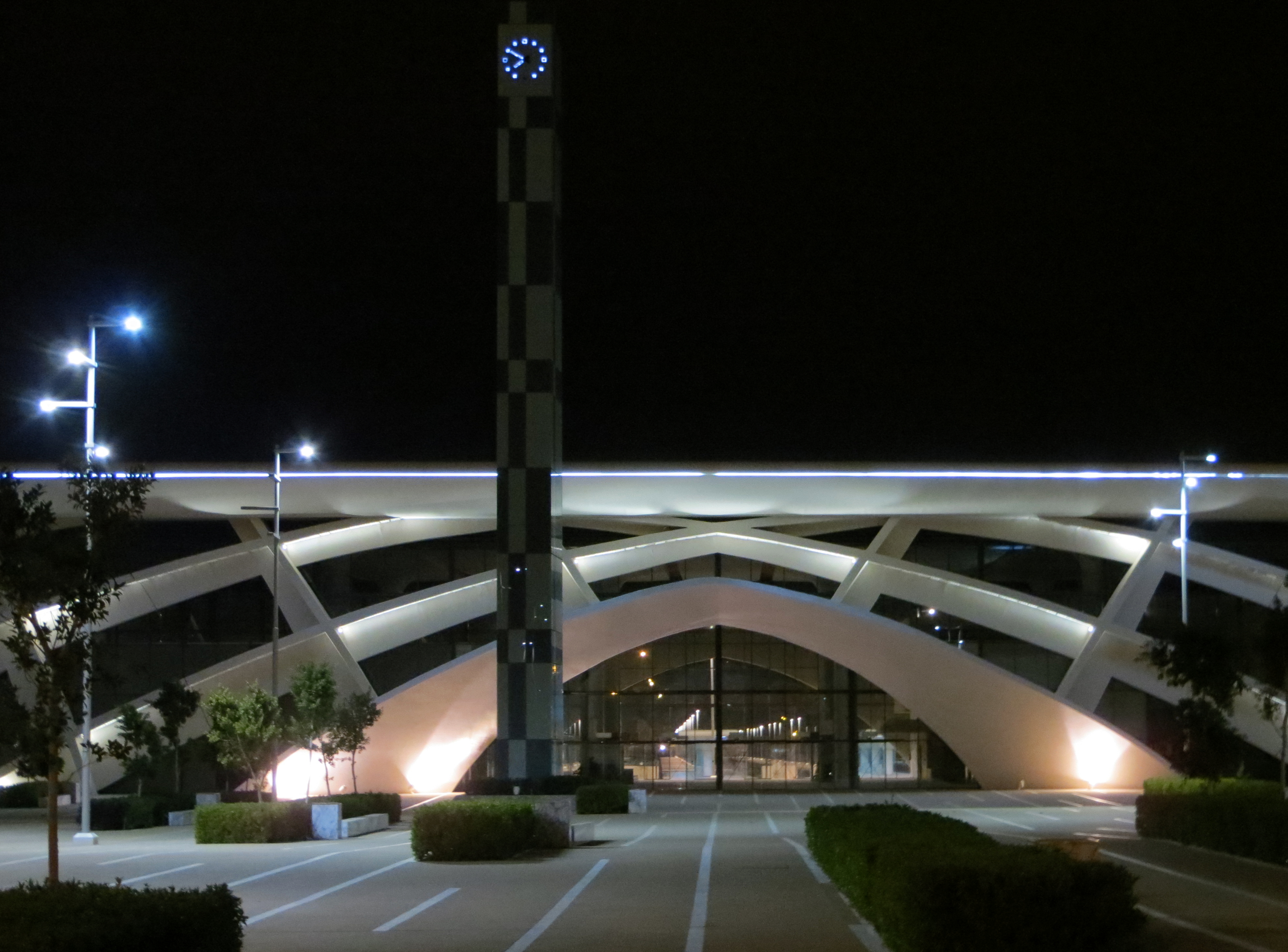
Oujda's new train station

Tourists aiming at Saïdia, bordering the Mediterranean, transit to Oujda's airport. The city is served by Angads Airport, which has connecting international flights to Lisbon, Brussels, Madrid, Marseille or Paris for example, as well as domestic flights to Casablanca.

The city is the endpoint of the main railroad from Casablanca via Fes and Taourirt before the border with Algeria. There are several day and night trains to and from the city, linking it to the western part of the country.

The Oriental Desert Express was originally built in the 1920s and 1930s as part of the Mediterranean–Niger Railway. One of its cars, the historical "prince's wagon" passenger car runs now twice annually. Outside camera shots of the Oriental Desert Express were featured in the 2015 James Bond film Spectre.

== Economy ==
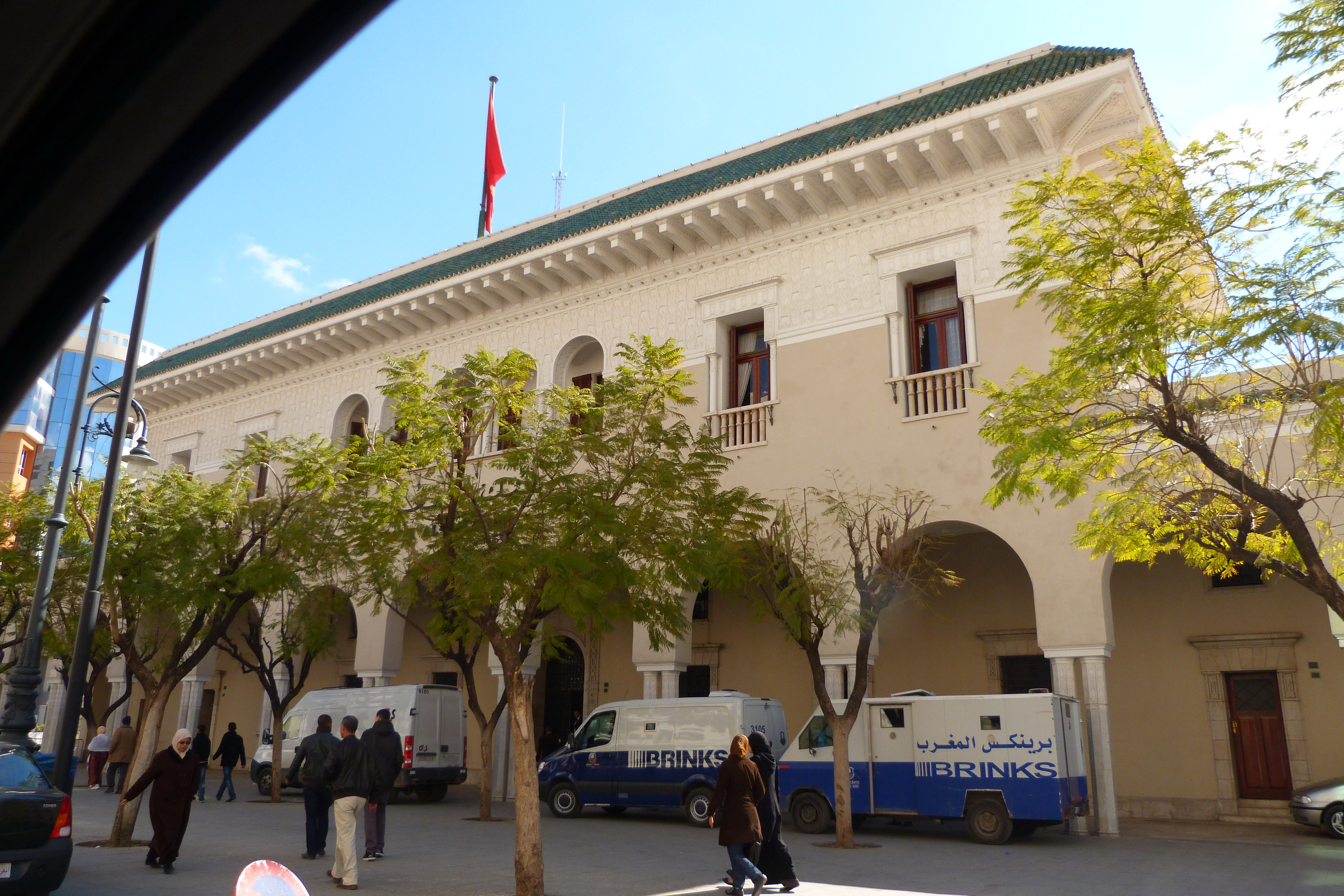
Bank Al-Maghrib branch at Oujda

Oujda has a strategic importance because of its location on the border. There are many economic and natural resources, however, the city struggles historically with an unemployment rate higher than the national average, standing on average at 20% compared to the 10.3% national average.

Oujda relies heavily on trading, given its location near the Algeria-Morocco border. Oujda's economy is directly related to the border's condition as it represents a passage for businesses directed toward Fes in the west, Talmasan in the east, Figuig in the south, and Melilla in the north.

On 18 March 2003, King Mohammed VI indicated the importance of reviving the economy of Morocco's Oriental. As a result of this effort, Technopole Oujda was established and the region witnessed road improvement, airport expansion and other projects.

== Sport ==
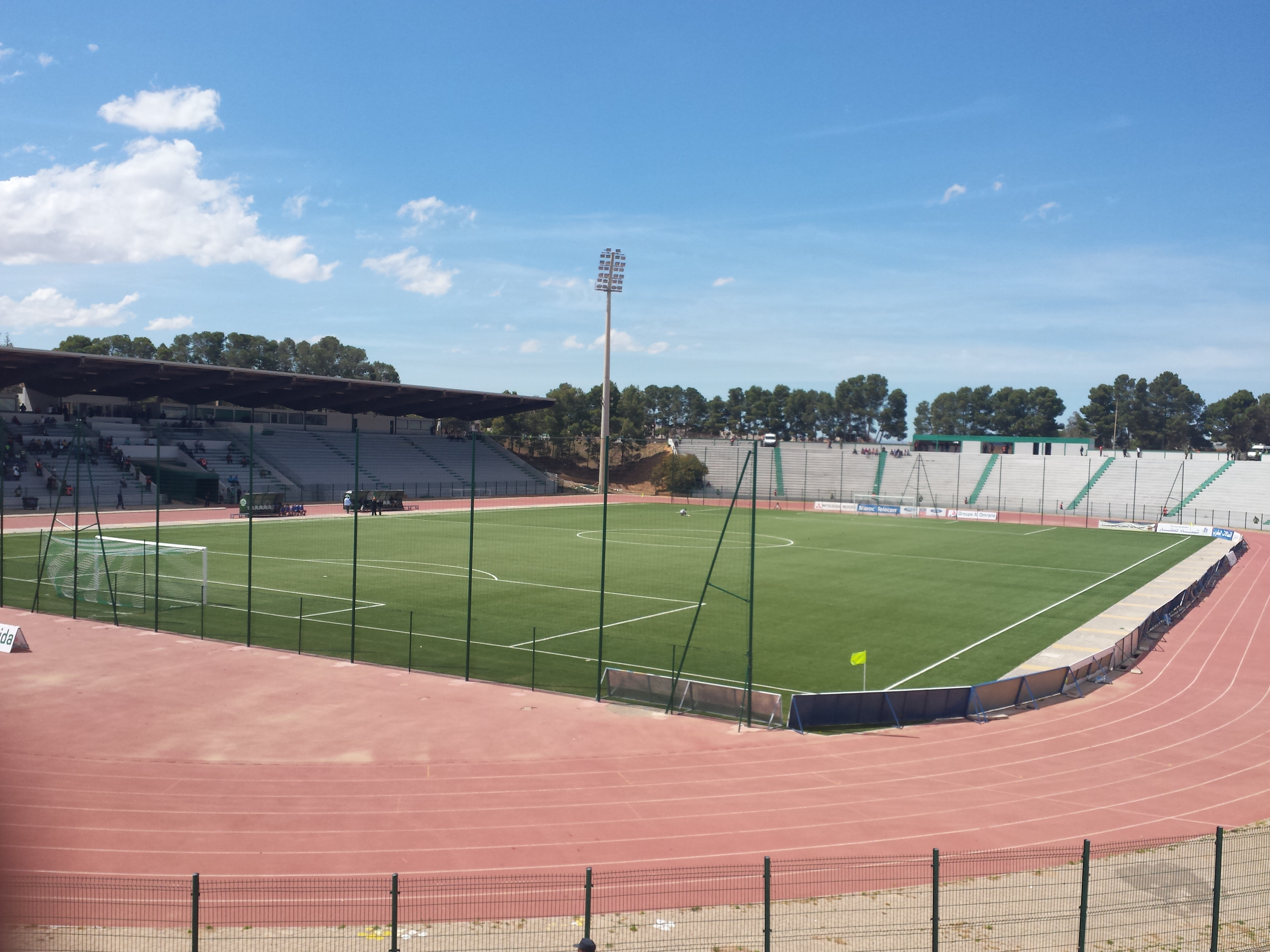
Honor Stadium

The sports infrastructure in Oujda is composed of a municipal stadium, an Olympic venue, the Honneur Stadium of Oujda, built in 1976, the sports complex 'Rock' including a rugby stadium, a complex tennis in the park Lala Aicha, a golf course, and two sports halls.

=== Football ===
In 1957, MC Oujda (MCO) became the first football club to win the Throne Cup of Morocco, defeating the Wydad of Casablanca, a feat the club repeated the following year. In 1959, in its third successive appearance in the final, the club lost against FAR of Rabat. However, in MC Oujda's fourth successive final, the club defeated FUS Rabat. In 1962 MCO won its last Throne cup against the Kawkab Athletic Club of Marrakech.

After ten years, MC Oujda came back to win in 1972 the Maghreb Cup, three years after it won Morocco's Botola Pro.

US Musulmane d'Oujda is another football club in Oujda.

Honor Stadium is the main football venue in Oujda.

== Notable people ==
=== Arts and cinema ===
- Hafid Bouazza – Writer
- Hamid Bouchnak – Moroccan raï singer and songwriter
- Nathalie Delon – Actress and director
- Douzi – Singer and songwriter
- Les Freres Megri – Rock band very popular in the Arab world, composers and producers.
- Philippe Faucon – Filmmaker
- Fouad Laroui – Writer and economist
- Michel Qissi – Actor
- Mimoun El Oujdi – Raï singer
- Younes Megri – Actor, singer author of 'Leli Touil' sung by Maria de Rossi & Boney M.
- Abdelkrim Derkaoui – Cinematographer, film director and screenwriter
- Bassouar Al Maghnaoui – Singer
- Simon Basinger – Musicologist, essayist, producer and author.
- Charlotte Slovack – Filmmaker
- Serge Guirao – Singer

=== Sports ===
- Adil Belgaid – Olympic judo fighter (3 times World Champion, 6 times African Champion, 3 times Arab Champion, 3 times Olympian)
- Abdelatif Benazzi – Rugby player
- Philippe Casado – Cyclist
- Abdelkarim Kissi – Footballer
- Soufiane Kourdou – Professional basketball player
- Moha Rharsalla – Footballer
- Mohammed Qissi – Actor (Kickboxer, Bloodsport with Jean Claude Vandamme)
- Mohcin Cheaouri – Track and Field athlete, 2 times African champion
- Yahya Berrabah – Olympic athlete, African champion in long jump
- Daniel Sanchez – Footballer
- Gilles Simon – Formula 1
- Ahmed Belkedroussi – Football manager
- Khadfi Rharsallah – Footballer
- Marianne Agulhon – Slalom canoeist
- Mohammed Berrabeh – International footballer
- Hassan Alla – Footballer
- Mohammed Ben Brahim – Footballer
- Khalid Chalqi – Footballer
- Gerard Soler – Football midfielder
- Khalid Lebji – Football midfielder
- Abou El Kacem Hadji – Footballer
- Ryad El Alami – Footballer
- Abdelah Kafifi – Footballer
- Mohamed Atmani – Boxer (Summer Olympics)
- Soufiane Kourdou – Basketball player
- Houssam Amaanan – Footballer
- Habib Allah Dahmani – Footballer

=== Politicians ===
- Ahmed Osman – Former Prime Minister, married King Hassan II's sister, Lalla Nuzha of Morocco
- Zoulikha Nasri – Advisor to King Mohammed IV, MD of foundation 'Mohammed V for Solidarity'
- Muhammad Ben Abdessalam Al Muqri – Late 19th senior official, advisor and grand vizier to several sultans.
- Abdelkader Lecheheb – Football player and Ambassador to Russia
- Mohamed Allal Sinaceur – Former Minister of Cultural Affairs
- Mohamed Habib Sinaceur – Politician
- Ahmed Toufiq Hejira – Former Minister of Housing and Urbanism
- Kaddour El Ouartassi – Historian
- Najima Rhozali – Politician, professor
- Yvette Katan Bensamoun – Historian
- Omar Benjelloun – Journalist
- Abdelaziz Bouteflika – (1937–2021), 7th President of Algeria
- Abdelnour Abbrous – Politician
- Chakib Khelil – Politician
- Hassnae Bouazza – Journalist, writer, columnist
- Louisette Ighilariz – Politician

=== Business ===
- Fatéma Hal – chef and writer
- Maurice Levy – French businessman, Chairman of Publicis Group.

=== Other ===
- Islam Mitat – woman who was tricked by her Afghan-British husband into joining the Islamic State

== Town twinning ==
- (United Kingdom) Trowbridge, UK, (2009) Trowbridge has the largest Moroccan community in the UK outside London, and is the first UK town to be twinned with a place from a Muslim country. At the time, Trowbridge had approximately 80 resident families who had roots in Oujda.
- Lille, France
- Sevran, France
- Jouy-le-Moutier, France
- Aix-en-Provence, France (2007)
- Jeddah, Saudi Arabia
- East Jerusalem, Palestine
- Sirte, Libya
- Oran, Algeria
- Molenbeek-Saint-Jean, Belgium

== See also ==
- Oujda group – an Algerian political faction named after the town
- Oujda Pogrom (1948)
- Capture of Oujda (1647)
- Berkane
