= Calle Málaga =

2025 film by Maryam Touzani

- Spanish theatrical release poster
- Directed by: Maryam Touzani
- Written by: Maryam Touzani; Nabil Ayouch
- Produced by: Nabil Ayouch; Amine Benjelloun; Jean-Rémi Ducourtioux
- Starring: Carmen Maura; Marta Etura; Ahmed Boulane; María Alfonsa Rosso; Miguel Garcés
- Cinematography: Virginie Surdej
- Edited by: Teresa Font
- Music by: Freya Arde
- Production companies: Ali n' Productions; Les Films du Nouveau Monde; MOD Producciones; One Two Films; Velvet Films
- Distributed by: Ad Vitam (France); Caramel Films (Spain); Pandora Film (Germany); Cinéart (Belgium); Zaza Films (Morocco)
- Release dates: 29 August 2025 (Venice); 25 February 2026 (France); 1 April 2026 (Spain)
- Running time: 116 minutes
- Countries: Morocco; France; Spain; Germany; Belgium
- Languages: Spanish; Arabic

Calle Málaga is a 2025 drama film directed by Maryam Touzani, in her Spanish-language directorial debut, co-written by Touzani and Nabil Ayouch. It stars Carmen Maura as Maria Angeles, a widow who fights to keep her family house in Tangier after her daughter decides to sell it.

The film had its world premiere in the Venice Spotlight section of the 82nd Venice International Film Festival on 29 August 2025, where it won the section's Audience Award. It was theatrically released in France by Ad Vitam on 25 February 2026, and in Spain by Caramel Films on 1 April.

It was selected as the Moroccan submission for the Best International Feature Film at the 98th Academy Awards, but it was not nominated for the short list.

== Cast ==
- Carmen Maura as Maria Angeles
- Marta Etura as Clara
- Ahmed Boulane as Abslam
- María Alfonsa Rosso as Josefa
- Miguel Garcés as Doctor Tovar
- La Imèn as Soukaina

== Production ==
In May 2024, it was reported that Touzani would make her Spanish-language feature debut; Films Boutique acquired the film's international sales. The project received a €551,289 production grant from the Spanish Institute of Cinematography and Audiovisual Arts in September 2024. In November 2024, it secured a €500,000 production grant from Eurimages. In February 2025, it was reported that Carmen Maura joined the cast.

The film is a co-production by companies from Morocco (Ali n' Productions), France (Les Films du Nouveau Monde), Spain (Mod Producciones), Germany (One Two Films), and Belgium (Velvet Films); it also had the participation of RTVE and Movistar Plus+.

Principal photography took place in Tangier, Morocco and wrapped in January 2025.

== Release ==
Calle Málaga had its world premiere at the 82nd Venice International Film Festival at the Venice Spotlight section. It had its North American premiere at the 2025 Toronto International Film Festival on 9 September 2025 at the Special Presentations section.

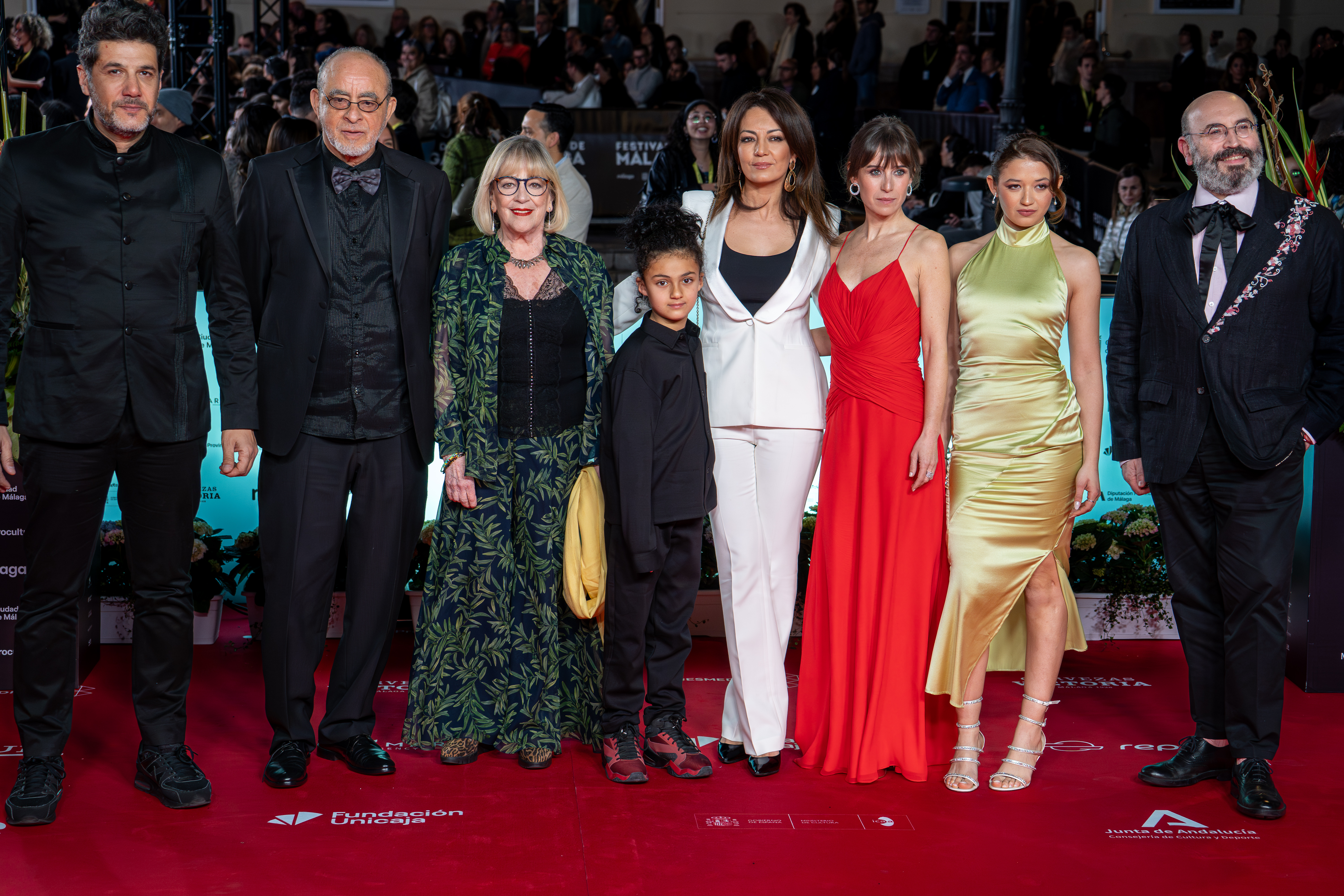
Cast and crew members (including Nabil Ayouch, Ahmed Boulane, Carmen Maura, Maryam Touzani, Marta Etura, La Imèn, and Simón de Santiago attending the presentation of the film at the 29th Málaga Film Festival in March 2026

It opened the 37th Palm Springs International Film Festival on 2 January 2026. It was selected as the opening film for the official selection of the 29th Málaga Film Festival.

Ad Vitam acquired the film's French distribution and originally set an 18 March 2026 theatrical release date, later advanced to 25 February 2026. Caramel Films is set to release the film in Spanish theatres on 1 April 2026.

Strand Releasing acquired North American distribution rights. Rights were also sold in Australia and New Zealand (Potential), Austria (Panda Lichtspiele), Benelux (Cinéart), Germany (Pandora), Italy (Movies Inspired), Greece (Danaos), Hungary (Cirko Film), Morocco (Zaza Films), Poland (Gutek), Portugal (Leopardo Filmes), Scandinavia (Future Film), and Switzerland (Filmcoopi).

== Reception ==
For Deadline, film reviewer Pete Hammond writes the film is "a lovely ode to growing old but not giving in to age" and calls it "a joy largely because of its veteran star who envelops the screen."

Sergio F. Pinilla of Cinemanía rated Calle Málaga 3½ out of 5 stars, declaring it a "comforting, luminous, and cathartic" film.

On the review aggregator website Rotten Tomatoes, 98% of 41 critics' reviews are positive. The website's consensus reads: "Anchored by a resplendent turn from Carmen Maura, Calle Málaga's modest scale belies an outsize charm and wisdom as it gently celebrates the right to self-determination." On Metacritic, the film has a weighted average score of 73 out of 100 based on 12 critics, which the site labels as "generally favorable" reviews.

Bavner Donaldo, an Indonesian film critic writing for Cinejour, rated the film 3.8 out of 5 stars, declaring it a "memorable viewing experience" that offers "a sense of optimism amidst the loneliness of aging."

=== Accolades ===
Award	Date of ceremony	Category	Recipient(s)	Result	Ref.
Venice International Film Festival	6 September 2025	Audience Award (Venice Spotlight)	Calle Málaga	Won	
Mill Valley Film Festival	14 October 2025	Audience Favorite – World Cinema	Calle Málaga	Won	
Tromsø International Film Festival	25 January 2026	Audience Award (popular vote)	Calle Málaga	Won	
Göteborg Film Festival	31 January 2026	Dragon Award Best International Film	Calle Málaga	Won	
Mar del Plata International Film Festival	16 November 2025	Best Film – International Competition	Calle Málaga	Won	
Mar del Plata International Film Festival	16 November 2025	Audience Award	Calle Málaga	Won	
Mar del Plata International Film Festival	16 November 2025	Best Actress	Carmen Maura	Won	
Forqué Awards	19 December 2026	Best Actress in a Film	Carmen Maura	Pending	

== See also ==
- List of submissions to the 98th Academy Awards for Best International Feature Film
- List of Moroccan submissions for the Academy Award for Best International Feature Film
