= The Years of Exile =

- Les années de l'exil
- Starring: Nabyl Lahlou, Sophia Hadi, Younes Megri
- Cinematography: Mostapha Marjane
- Edited by: Noun Lam
- Production company: Loukkous Films
- Release date: 2002
- Running time: 87 minutes
- Country: Morocco
- Language: Moroccan Arabic

The Years of Exile is a 2002 film directed by Nabyl Lahlou. It is adapted from the novel Une enquête au pays by Driss Chraîbi. This film shows the resistance of Berber villagers in the High Atlas against the representatives of the Moroccan administration in the 1960s.

== Synopsis ==
Mohammed, a police chief, and his deputy inspector Ali are looking for a criminal who has taken refuge in a remote Berber village. They land at the home of the Aït Yafelmane family and will eventually set the village on fire.

== Cast ==
- Nabyl Lahlou
- Sophia Hadi
- Younes Megri
- Mohamed Belfkih
- Amal Ayouch
- Mahjoub Raji
- Mehdi Piro
