= Miguel Garcés =

Spanish actor

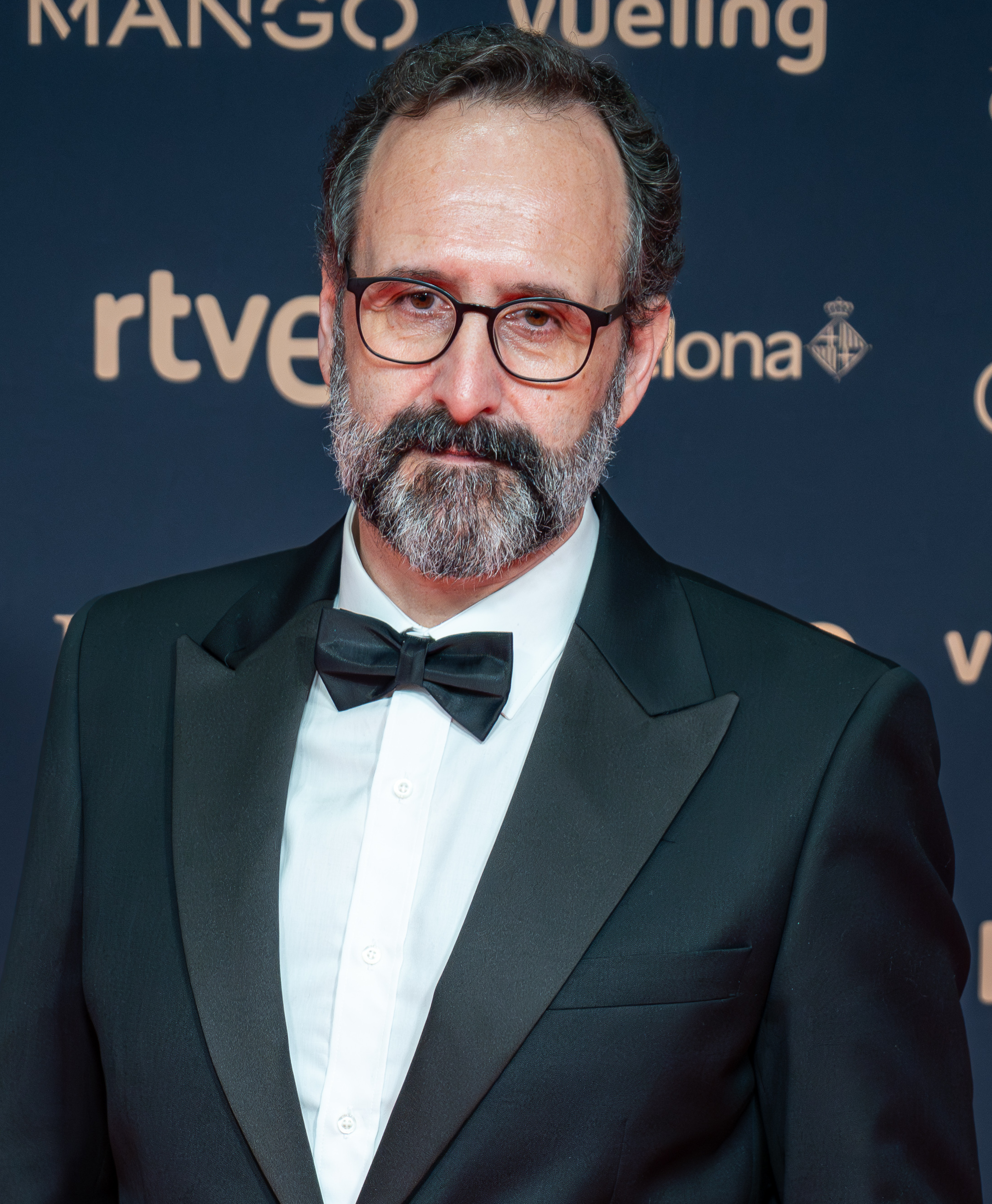
Garcés in 2026

Miguel Garcés is a Spanish actor based in the Basque Country.

Born in Valladolid, from 1991 to 1995 he studied and graduated from the School of Dramatic Art of Valladolid. Relocated to Montaña Alavesa in 2008, he was a member of the theatre company Zanguango Teatro from 2008 to 2023. He also created an independent theatre group in 2019 with his partner. He ended his theatre career due to the precariousness of the sector and an increasing number of opportunities on screen. He appeared in films such as Maixabel, 20,000 Species of Bees, I'm Nevenka, Nina, Sundays, and Calle Málaga and series such as Presunto culpable, La unidad, Offworld, Fine Arts, and Querer. For his performance in Sundays as the father of the protagonist, a teenager who wants to become a nun, he landed a nomination for the Goya Award for Best Leading Actor.
