= Le Gouverneur General de l'ile Chakerbakerben =

- Directed by: Nabyl Lahlou
- Written by: Nabyl Lahlou
- Starring: Nabyl Lahlou, Fouad Dziri, Mohamed Miftah
- Cinematography: Brahim Chamat
- Edited by: Lahcen Khabbaz
- Release date: 1980
- Running time: 96 minutes
- Country: Morocco
- Language: Moroccan Arabic
- Budget: 660.000 MAD

Le Gouverneur General de l'ile Chakerbakerben (English: The Governor of Chakerbakerben Island) is a 1980 Moroccan film directed by Nabyl Lahlou.

== Synopsis ==
Al Gharbi works in the telex booth of a newspaper. One day, he receives a dispatch about an island whose governor has disappeared.

== Cast ==
- Nabyl Lahlou
- Fouad Dziri
- Mohamed Miftah
- Noureddine Bikr
