= The Soul That Brays =

- Directed by: Nabyl Lahlou
- Written by: Nabyl Lahlou
- Starring: Sofia Hadi, Ahmed Bourachid, Nabyl Lahlou,
- Cinematography: Mostapha Marjane
- Edited by: Nabyl Lahlou
- Music by: Ralph Dalbo
- Release date: 1984
- Running time: 105 min
- Country: Morocco
- Language: Moroccan Arabic

The Soul That Brays (French: Âme qui brait, Arabic: نهيق الروح) is 1984 Moroccan film directed by Nabyl Lahlou.

== Synopsis ==
Through the tragic fate of a former resistance fighter, a donkey narrates the story of the citizens who participated in the struggle against the authorities of the French protectorate during the exile of King Mohammed V, and of the traitors who collaborated with the colonizers to become rich.

== Cast ==
- Sophia Hadi
- Ahmed Bourachid
- Nabyl Lahlou
- Ahmed Yazami
