= Jbel Hamra =

Mountain in Morocco

Coordinates: 34°37′46.49″N 1°53′2.69″W

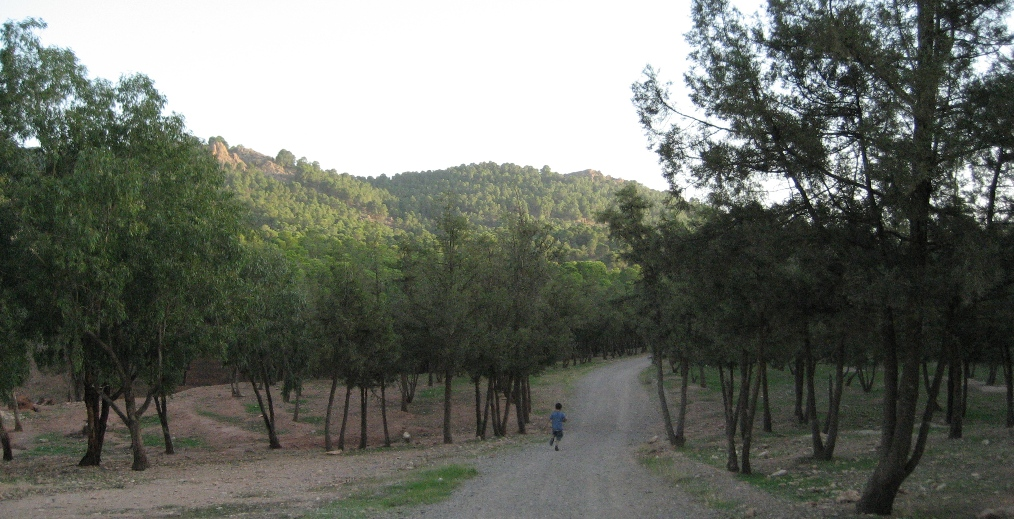
Jbel Hamra

Jbel Hamra is a mountain located in Oriental Region, Oujda, Morocco. The estimated terrain elevation above sea level is 781 m.
