= The Night of the Crime (film) =

- Directed by: Nabyl Lahlou
- Written by: Nabyl Lahlou, Sophia Hadi, Safy Boutella
- Starring: Nabyl Lahlou, Sophia Hadi
- Cinematography: Ahmed Zine Bessa
- Edited by: Nabyl Lahlou
- Music by: Abdelouahab Doukkali
- Production company: Loukous Films
- Release date: 1992
- Running time: 94 minutes
- Country: Morocco
- Language: Moroccan Arabic

The Night of the Crime (French: La nuit du crime, Arabic: ليلة قتل) is a 1992 Moroccan film directed by Nabyl Lahlou.

== Synopsis ==
Salim, a reporter, is having trouble with his wife Nadia. They have lost their passion for each other, and Nadia falls in love with Miloud, Salim's driver. Miloud then murders his boss.

== Cast ==
- Nabyl Lahlou
- Sophia Hadi
- Safy Boutella
- Salim Berrada
- Mohamed Kaghat
- Khadija Marrakchi
