= Grand Mosque of Oujda =

Mosque in Oujda, Morocco

- الجامع الكبير
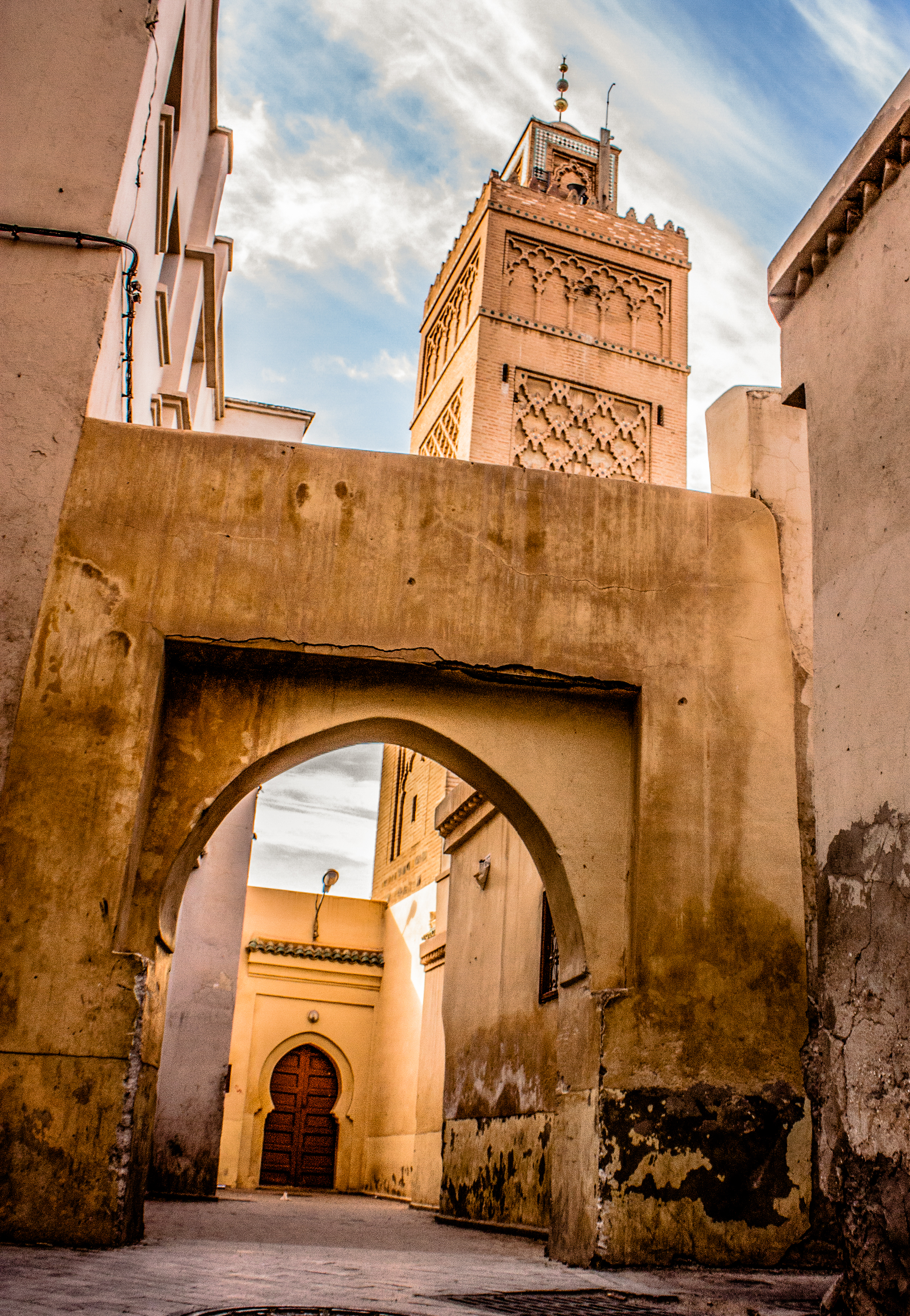

- Location within Morocco

Religion
- Sect: (Maliki) Sunni

Location
- Location: Oujda, Morocco
- Coordinates: 34°40′45″N 1°54′47″W

Architecture
- Type: mosque
- Style: Marinid, Moroccan, Islamic
- Founder: Sultan Abu Ya'qub Yusuf
- Established: 1296 CE
- Minaret: 1

The Grand Mosque of Oujda (Arabic: الجامع الكبير) is the historic main Friday mosque of Oujda, Morocco. The mosque was founded by the Marinid sultan Abu Ya'qub Yusuf in 1296.

== Architecture ==
The mosque is large and slightly irregular in its floor plan due to multiple expansions and modifications over the centuries. The mosque's mihrab (niche symbolizing direction of prayer) and the ornamental arches near it are believed to date from its original construction, while the current courtyard (sahn) and much of the north-east section of the mosque is of a later construction. Most of the mosque is of a simple construction in the same hypostyle form of other Moroccan mosques. A well-proportioned minaret, 24 meters high and with decorated facades, stands on the mosque's western side. The minaret was likely built or completed in 1317, a couple of decades after the mosque's foundation.

== See also ==
- List of mosques in Morocco
