= Look at the King in the Moon =

- Regarde le roi dans la lune
- Directed by: Nabyl Lahlou
- Written by: Nabyl Lahlou
- Produced by: Nabyl Lahlou
- Starring: Sophia Hadi, Nabyl Lahlou, Mehdi Piro
- Cinematography: Ahmed Zine Bessa, Mostapha Marjane
- Edited by: Noun Lam
- Music by: Younes Megri
- Release date: 2011
- Running time: 118 minutes
- Country: Morocco
- Language: Moroccan Arabic

Look at the King in the Moon (French: Regarde le roi dans la lune) is a 2011 film directed by Nabyl Lahlou. It was screened at the Cairo International Film Festival.

== Synopsis ==
Tortured by policemen seeking to extract confessions from him about his shady association with a certain William Shakespeare, Fettah Aberkane falls into a coma. In his agony, he imagines the film he has always dreamed of making.

== Cast ==
- Sophia Hadi
- Nabyl Lahlou
- Mehdi Piro
- Houssam Benkhadra
- Ilias Boujendar
- Bakr Fekkak
