= The Moroccan Symphony =

- Directed by: Kamal Kamal
- Screenplay by: Kamal Kamal
- Produced by: Vidéo Star Production
- Starring: Younes Megri, Abdellah Lamrani, Rafik Boubker, Aziz Hattab
- Release date: 1 February 2006
- Running time: 105 minutes
- Country: Morocco
- Language: Arabic

The Moroccan Symphony (French: La symphonie marocaine) is a 2006 Moroccan film directed by Kamal Kamal. It was Morocco's submission to the 79th Academy Awards for the Academy Award for Best Foreign Language Film, but was not accepted as a nominee.

== Plot ==
The movie is an homage to two songs, Dart bina doura of Jil Jilala and Khlili of Lemchaheb. The movie depicts how great music can act as a social elevator. The main role is played by the singer and composer Younès Megri.

== Description ==
The Moroccan Symphony is the second movie of Kamal Kamal. It was featured during the 8th Festival national du film (FNF) in Tanger.

== See also ==
- Cinema of Morocco
- List of submissions to the 79th Academy Awards for Best Foreign Language Film
