= Les Frères Megri =

MUSIC CREW

Les Frères Mégri
- Origin: Oujda, Morocco
- Genres: Psychedelic rock, Progressive rock, folk rock
- Years active: Late '60s - Early '70s
- Labels: Philips Records
- Members: Hassan Mégri; Mahmoud Mégri; Younès Mégri; Jalila Mégri

Les Frères Mégri (Arabic: الإخوان مجري, English: Megri Brothers) was a Moroccan rock band formed in Oujda, Morocco. The band consisted of four members, the three brothers, Hassan, Mahmoud and Younès Mégri, and their sister Jalila Mégri. Before the creation of the band, the four Megri brothers were popular session musicians, composers and producers from Morocco.

In the early seventies, after they signed a recording contract with Philips Records of France, Hassan and Mahmoud released four singles as Les Frères Mégri. "El Harib/Heya Essamra", "Galouli Ensaha/Kellemtini", "Sebar / Ououd Ou Chouk" in 1971 and "Sabar / Chaaltiha Nar" in 1972. The band gained wide recognition in Morocco, the Arab World and Europe. Later, Les Frères Mégri released two albums in 1974, the first album "Younes et Mahmoud" (Arabic: يونس و محمود مكري) was a collaboration between Younès and Mahmoud. The second album, released in the same year, "Younes Hassan Mahmoud" (Arabic: يونس حسن محمود) was a collaboration between all three brothers. In 2004, Hassan and Jalila released an album "Hassan & Jalila" (Arabic: حسن و جليلة) as Les Mégri.

== Discography ==
=== Albums ===
- 1974: Younes et Mahmoud
- 1974: Younes Hassan Mahmoud
- 2004: Hassan & Jalila

=== Singles ===
- El Harib / Heya Essamra (Released date unknown)
- Galouli Ensaha / Kellemtini (Released date unknown)
- 1971: Sebar / Ououd Ou Chouk
- 1972: Sabar / Chaaltiha Nar

== See also ==
- Music of Morocco
