= Al Kanfoudi =

- Directed by: Nabyl Lahlou
- Written by: Nabyl Lahlou
- Starring: Nabyl Lahlou, Mustapha Mounir, Hammadi Ammor
- Cinematography: Ahmed Zanati
- Edited by: Ahmed Bouanani
- Release date: 1978
- Running time: 86 minutes
- Country: Morocco
- Language: Moroccan Arabic

Al Kanfoudi is a 1978 Moroccan film directed by Nabyl Lahlou. The film was one of Lahlou's few projects to receive CCM funding.

== Synopsis ==
Hamid Kanfoudi, an orchestra conductor, wins the lottery. Contrary to his beliefs and expectations, he sees no improvement in his life.

== Cast ==
- Nabyl Lahlou
- Mustapha Mounir
- Hammadi Ammor
- Ahmed El Maanouni
- Mohamed Miftah
