= Younes Megri =

Moroccan singer and artist

- Born: 15 November 1951 (age 74); Oujda, Morocco
- Occupations: Actor, Singer-songwriter, Singer, Film score composer, Composer, Television actor, Film actor

Younès Mégri (Arabic: يونس ميكري; born November 15, 1951, in Oujda, Morocco) is a Moroccan singer and actor.

== Career ==
Younes Megri started singing and playing guitar at a very young age and came from a family of artists. His father played the lute and practiced painting, his mother sang in a religious music band, his brothers played the guitar, and his sister was a singer. In 1960, the family moved to Rabat. He studied music at the Moroccan National Conservatory of Music in Rabat, as well as at the École Normale de Musique de Paris.

=== As part of Les Frères Mégri ===
He became part of Les Frères Mégri (the Megri Brothers) singing group, made up of the three brothers, Hassan, Mahmoud and Younès Mégri, and their sister Jalila Mégri. Younès was their youngest member. In 1974, Les Frères Mégri released the album Younes et Mahmoud (Arabic: يونس و محمود مكري) that was a collaboration between the brothers Younès and Mahmoud. The second album, released the same year, was entitled Younes, Hassan, Mahmoud (Arabic: يونس حسن محمود) was a collaboration between all three brothers.

=== Solo career ===
As a solo artist, he had an even bigger career performing throughout the Maghreb countries and in many European capitals, achieving international success particularly in France. His biggest success was the song "Lili Twili," (Note: Arabic: ليلي طويل, lit. 'my night is long') which was sampled by the German band Boney M. in their song "Children of Paradise." He received a Golden Record for this song, and performed at the Olympia in 1985 during his solo career.

=== Film career ===
During the 1990s, he also began to compose film music for Moroccan and international films, most notably Gabriel Axel's "Leïla" and "8MM" for which he worked with Michael Dana as a consultant.

After a brief role in 1980, he had a prosperous film career starting in the 1990s, especially after the Moroccan casting director Ahmed Boulane offered him roles for Moroccan and international films, with Boulane's first feature film Ali, Rabiaa et les Autres in 2000, shooting Younès Mégri to stardom as a leading actor in Moroccan films. Mégri also played in many Moroccan television serials.

== Discography ==
=== Albums ===
As Les Frères Mégri

- 1974: Younes et Mahmoud
- 1974: Younes, Hassan, Mahmoud

=== Solo ===
Singles

- "Lili Twili"

== Filmography ==
=== Actor ===
- 1995: Marie de Nazareth (film, 1995) as a disciple of Jesus
- 1997: David as a foot soldier (TV movie)
- 1999: The Seventh Scroll as Omar (TV mini-series)
- 2001: Ali, Rabiaa et les Autres...
- 2003: Face to Face as Redouane
- 2003: Ancient Egyptians as an Egyptian (TV series - episode four "The Twins Tale")
- 2005: The Government Inspector as General Amin (TV movie)
- 2006: The Moroccan Symphony as Hamid
- 2006: Heaven's Doors in a cameo appearance
- 2006: The Miracles of Jesus as an apostle (TV mini-series)
- 2007: The Satanic Angels as Momo's Father
- 2008: Amours voilées as Hamza

=== Music composer ===
- 1997: Voyage dans le passé (short)
- 1998: Les amis d'hier
- 2001: Ali, Rabiaa et les Autres...
- 2001: Drole de journée dans le desert (short)
- 2001: Leïla
- 2002: The Wind Horse
- 2003: Moi, ma mère et Bétina (TV movie)
- 2004: La Chambre noire
- 2007: Deux Femmes Sur La Route
- 2010: Pour la vie
