= The Satanic Angels =

- French: Les Anges de Satan
- Directed by: Ahmed Boulane
- Screenplay by: Ahmed Boulane
- Starring: Mansour Badri, Amal Chabli, Younes Megri, Driss Roukhe, Amal Ayouch, Rafik Boubker, Amina Rachid
- Cinematography: Serge Hannecart
- Edited by: Arbi Ben Ali
- Music by: Joël Pellegrini
- Production companies: Boulane O'Byrne Prod., Cinédina Studios
- Release date: 2007
- Running time: 85 minutes
- Country: Morocco

The Satanic Angels (French: Les Anges de Satan) is a 2007 Moroccan film, directed by Ahmed Boulane.

== Synopsis ==
The Satanic Angels is the story of fourteen young hard rock musicians who are arrested and sentenced to three months to one year in jail for "shaking the foundations of Islam" and "Satanism" after a surrealistic trial. Society and the media mobilize to free them.

== Awards ==
- Festival National du Film (Tanger, 2007)
- India International Film Festival (2007)
- Avanca Film Festival (Portugal, 2007)
