= Ali Zaoua =

Ali Zaoua: Prince of the Street
- Directed by: Nabil Ayouch
- Written by: Nabil Ayouch; Nathalie Saugeon
- Produced by: Étienne Comar; Jean Cottin; Antoine Voituriez
- Starring: Maunim Kbab; Abdelhak Zhayra; Hicham Moussaune; Amal Ayouch; Mustapha Hansali; Saïd Taghmaoui
- Cinematography: Renaat Lambeets; Vincent Mathias
- Edited by: Jean-Robert Thomann
- Music by: Krishna Levy
- Distributed by: Arab Film Distribution (United States)
- Release date: September 8, 2000
- Running time: 90 minutes
- Country: Morocco
- Languages: Arabic; French

Ali Zaoua: Prince of the Streets is a 2000 Moroccan crime drama film that tells the story of several homeless boys living in Casablanca. It was awarded in the 2000 Stockholm Film Festival, Montreal World Film Festival and in the 2000 Amiens International Film Festival.

== Plot ==
Against a background of dockside poverty in Casablanca, populated by a loose gang of over 20 homeless and uneducated male youths under 15, Kwita (Maunim Kbab), Omar (Mustapha Hansali), Boubker (Hicham Moussaune) and Ali Zaoua (Abdelhak Zhayra) leave the group becoming 4 independents. Ali, with plans of becoming a cabin boy on a ship, leads this exodus from the gang — led by Dib (Saïd Taghmaoui). Early in the film and almost accidentally, Ali is killed by members of the gang. His 3 outsider friends decide to give him a proper funeral. Kwita is treated badly by military, by police and by well-off children because he is "not devout", cannot pray, is unclean, smells like dead meat and is a glue sniffer, and Omar attempts to return to Dib's gang. Boubker, the smallest and most irrepressibly buoyant of the boys, temporarily despairs, but recovers. Against all odds, the three boys manage to arrange Ali's funeral to pay respect to their friend in the main story of the film.

== Awards ==
- Bronze Horse, 2000 Stockholm Film Festival
- Audience Award, 2000 Amiens International Film Festival
- Golden Crow Pheasant Award, 2001 International Film Festival of Kerala

== Importance and role of rituals depicted ==
Ali Zaoua is a Moroccan film which reflects the pain of poverty, homelessness, child abuse and prostitution in Moroccan society. The film has been described as magical realism, in the sense of how the stark reality of the children’s lives interweaves with their rich fantasy life. The contrast between real life and fantasy life shows the strong part of their beliefs. In their feeling and practice they are very different from each other. In this film Ali, Kwita, Omar and Boubker are street kids. The daily dose of glue sniffing represents their only escape from reality. Ali wants to become a sailor - when he was living with his mother, a prostitute, he used to listen to a fairy tale about the sailor who discovered the miracle island with two suns. Instead of finding his island in the dream, Ali and his friends are confronted with Dib’s gang. Matters are getting serious; the four kids separated themselves from Dib’s gang. As a result, Ali Zaoua is killed by Dib’s gang when he is hit by a stone. Omar and Baker wanted to bury him as king but circumstances do not support them.

== Bibliography ==
- Living, Thieving and Dying on Casablanca's Mean Streets, The New York Times, Dave Kehr, 16 April 2003
- Ali Zaoua, prince de la rue (2000), Cinemagazine, Charlotte Visser (in Dutch), Access date: 31 May 2022
- Ali Zaoua – Auf den Straßen von Casablanca (Träume des Elends), Schnitt.de, Mark Stöhr, 2012 (in German)
