= Nabyl Lahlou =

Moroccan actor and film director (1945–2026)

- نبيل لحلو
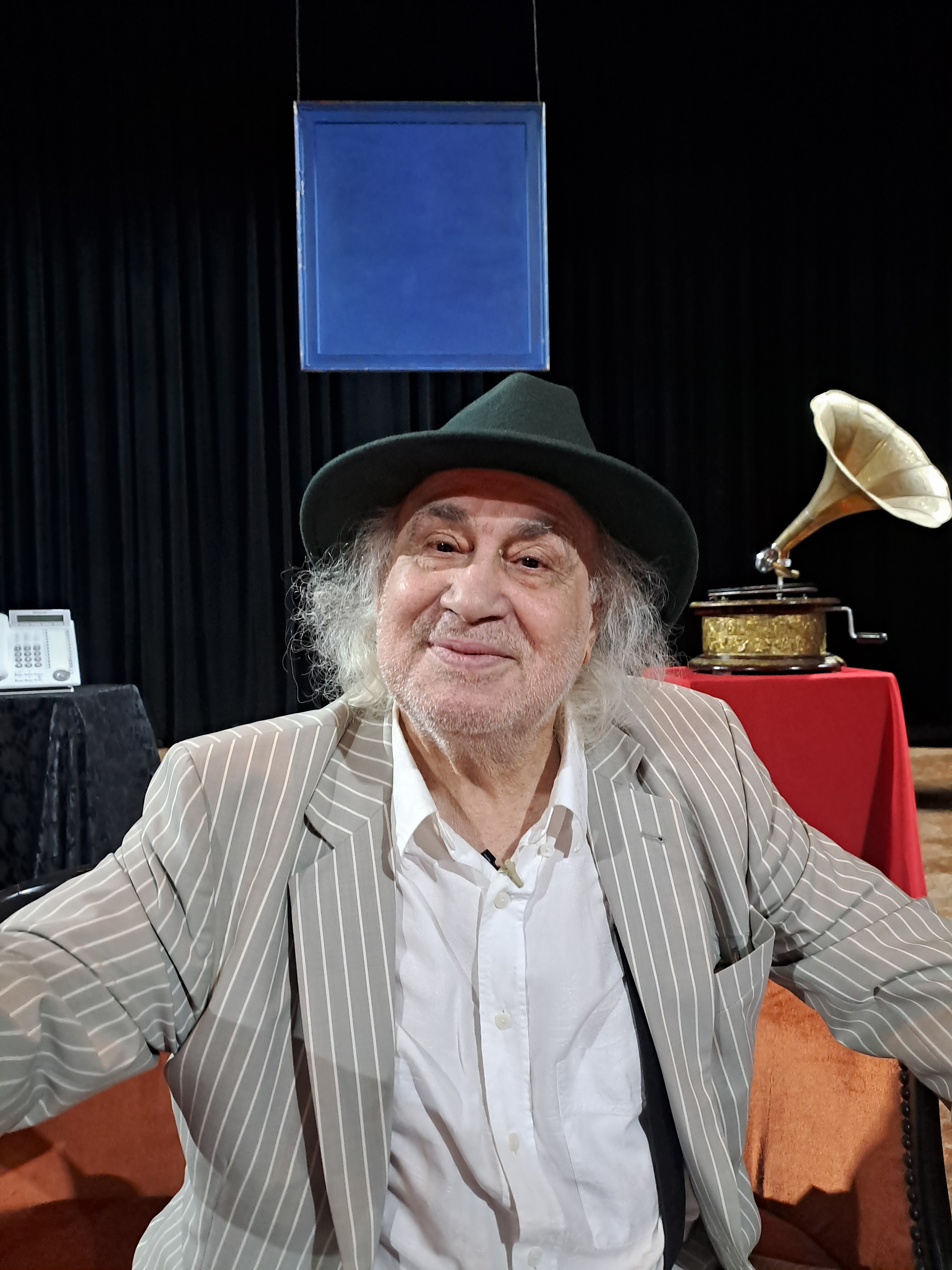
- Born: 1945; Fes, Morocco
- Died: 7 May 2026 (aged 81); Rabat, Morocco
- Education: Paris at Académie du Théâtre de la Rue Blanche and L'Ecole Charles Dullin
- Occupations: Film director; theater director; author; actor
- Notable work: Look at the King in the Moon
- Spouse: Sophia Hadi
- Children: Mariakenzi Lahlou

Nabyl Lahlou (Arabic: نبيل لحلو; 1945 – 7 May 2026) was a Moroccan film director, theatre director, author and actor, known for being an innovative theater and film director, and is considered one of the most influential Moroccan theater directors of the 1980s.

== Background ==
Nabyl Lahlou was born in 1945 in Fes, Morocco. He studied theater in Paris at Académie du Théâtre de la Rue Blanche and L'Ecole Charles Dullin, and later taught at Kordj-el-Kifane (Algeria). He wrote plays in both French and Arabic; among his French plays are Ophélie n'est pas morte (Ophelia is Not Dead) (1969) and Schrischamtury (1975), and among his Arabic Les Milliardaires (The Billionaires) (1968), Les Tortues (The Turtles) (1970), and Asseyez-vous sur les cadavres (Sit on Corpses) (1974). His first medium length film was Les Morts (The Dead) (1975), while his first feature-length film was Al Kanfoudi (1978).

Lahlou died in Rabat on 7 May 2026, at the age of 81.

== Theatre ==
Lahlou directed his first play Al-Sa"aa in Morocco in 1965, then left to study in France, returning in 1970.

Many of his works modified Shakespeare to reflect post-colonial Morocco. Written in 1968, his play Ophélie n'est pas morte was influenced by the Shakespearean, with its title being a reference to Shakespeare's Ophelia. Supported financially by the Morocco Ministry of Culture, it was first performed in 1969 by Lahlou's 'University Theater Companies'. Within the play, the two different Shakespeare characters of Hamlet and Macbeth are presented in a micro drama with the characters voluntarily paralyzed and their acting confined by the use of crutches or wheelchairs. His production of Al-Salahif (The Turtles) was considered a breakthrough.

== Filmography ==
- Les Morts (featurette, 1975)
- Al Kanfoudi (1978)
- Le Gouverneur General de l'ile Chakerbakerben (1980)
- Brahim Who? (1982)
- The Soul That Brays (1984)
- Komany (1989)
- The Night of the Crime (1992)
- The Years of Exile (2002)
- Tabite or Not Tabite (2005)
- Look at the King in the Moon (2011)
