= Amina =

Amina ʾĀmina آمنة ʾAmīna أمينة
- Pronunciation: آمنة (ʾĀmina): [ˈʔæːm(ɪ)næ] أمينة (ʾAmīna): [ʔæˈmiːnæ]
- Gender: Female

Origin
- Origin: Arabic
- Meaning: آمنة (ʾĀmina): safe one, protected أمينة (ʾAmīna): devoted, honest, straightforward, trusty, worth of belief (believable), loyal, faithful, obedient of Iman

Other names
- Related names: Aminah, Aminat, Aminas, Aminna, Amiina, Amine, Aminka, Aminke, Amines, Aminei, Aminata, Amiwata

Amina (or Aminah) is the loose transcription of two different Arabic female given names:

- ʾĀmina (Arabic: آمنة, also anglicized as Aaminah or Amna) meaning "safe one, protected"
- ʾAmīna (Arabic: أمينة, also anglicized as Ameena), the feminine form of Amin, meaning "devoted, honest, straightforward, trusty, worth of belief (believable), loyal, faithful, obedient of Iman".

The name is highly popular in Nigeria owing to Amina of Zazzau, a legendary Hausa warrior queen. Likewise in the neighbouring Cameroon and Niger. Its popularity across Asia and North Africa owes to Amina bint Wahb, the mother of Prophet Muhammad. In French-speaking West Africa, the name is rendered as Aminata and it is also popular.

== Women named Āmina ==
- Amina bint Wahb (549–577), mother of Muhammad
- Aaminah Haq (born 1973), Pakistani model and actress
- See also people listed at Amna

== Women named Amīna ==
- Amina of Zazzau (1533–1610), Hausa warrior queen of Zazzau (now Zaria), in what is now northwest Nigeria
- Princess Lalla Amina of Morocco (1954–2012), Moroccan princess
- Amina of the Maldives, or Amina Rani Kilegefa’anu (1745–??), monarch, as Sultana regnant, of the Maldives from 1757 until 1759 after acting as regent from 1753 until 1757
- Amina Abbas (born 1942), First Lady of Palestine
- Amina Mohamed Abdi (1981–2022), Somali politician
- Amina Bint al-Majlisi, female Safavid mujtahideh
- Amina Adil (1930–2004), Tatar writer and Islamic theologian
- Amina Afzali (born 1957), Afghani politician and government minister
- Amina Alaoui (born 1964), Moroccan interpreter of Andalusian classical music
- Amina Annabi (born 1962), French-Tunisian singer
- Amina Atakhanova (born 2002), Russian pair skater
- Amina Bakhit (born 1990), Sudanese middle-distance runner
- Amina Belouizdad (1931–2015), first female presenter on Algerian television
- Amina Benkhadra (born 1954), Moroccan politician
- Amina Bettiche (born 1987), Algerian steeplechase runner
- Amina Begum (died 1760), mother of Shuja-ud-Daula the last ruler of Bengal
- Amina Belkadi (born 1992), Algerian judoka
- Amina Bouayach (born 1957), Moroccan human rights activist
- Amina Cachalia (1930–2013), South African anti-Apartheid activist, women's rights activist and politician
- Amina Chifupa (1976–2007), Tanzanian politician and MP
- Amina Clement (born 1963), Tanzanian politician and MP
- Amina Dagi (born 1995), Russian-Austrian model and beauty pageant titleholder
- Amina Desai (died 2009), South Africa's longest serving female Indian political prisoner
- Amina Dilbazi (1919–2010), Azerbaijani folk dancer
- Amina Dika Abdullahi, Kenyan politician
- Amina Doherty, Nigerian women's rights advocate
- Amina Edris (born 1991), Egyptian-New Zealand lyric soprano
- Amina Figarova (born 1964), Azerbaijani jazz composer and pianist
- Amina Filali (1996–2012), Moroccan 16-year-old girl who committed suicide in 2012 after she was forced to marry her rapist
- Amina Gautier, American writer and academic
- Amina Gerba (born 1961), Cameroonian–Canadian businesswoman and entrepreneur
- Amina Goodwin (1867–1942), English pianist, composer, and music educator
- Amina Aït Hammou (born 1978), Moroccan runner
- Amina Helmi (born 1970), Argentine astronomer and professor
- Amina Moghe Hersi (born 1964), Somali entrepreneur
- Amina Hydari (1878–1939), Indian social worker
- Amina Ahmed El-Imam (born 1983), Nigerian microbiologist, academic and politician
- Amina Inloes, American scholar, researcher, educator, public speaker, translator
- Amina Al Jassim, Saudi Arabian fashion designer of haute couture and jellabiyas
- Amina Khalil (born 1988), Egyptian actress
- Amina Lawal (born 1973), Nigerian woman convicted by Islamic Sharia court in 2002
- Amina Lemrini, Moroccan human rights activist
- Amina Luqman-Dawson, American author
- Amina Pirani Maggi (1892–1979), Italian actress
- Amina Maher (born 1992), Iranian-born queer feminist artist, activist, actress, and filmmaker
- Amina Mama (born 1958), Nigerian-British writer, feminist and academic
- Amina Memon (born 1961), social and cognitive psychologist, academic, and author
- Amina Mohamed (born 1961), Somali lawyer, diplomat and politician
- Amina J. Mohammed (born 1961), United Nations Special Adviser
- Amina Claudine Myers (born 1942), American jazz pianist, organist, vocalist, composer, and musical arranger
- Amina Okueva (1983–2017), Ukrainian doctor, Euromaidan activist, and police lieutenant
- Amina Lahbabi-Peters, Moroccan interpreter and translator
- Amina Priscille Longoh (born 1991), Chadian humanitarian organizer and politician
- Amina Pollard, American limnologist and ecologist
- Amina Abdi Rabar (born 1989), Kenyan TV and radio presenter
- Amina Rachid (1936–2019), Moroccan actress
- Amina Rakhim (born 1989), Kazakhstani tennis player
- Amina Rizk (1910–2003), Egyptian actress
- Amina Rouba (born 1986), Algerian rower
- Amina Al Rustamani, Emirati businesswoman
- Amina Al Said (1914–1995), an Egyptian journalist and feminist
- Amina Said (born 1953), Tunisian francophone author
- Amina Sato (born 1990), Japanese voice actress
- Amina Shah (1918–2014), anthologiser of Sufi stories and folk tales
- Amina Shah (librarian), Scottish librarian
- Amina Srarfi (born 1958), Tunisian musician
- Amina Hanum Syrtlanoff (1884–??), public figure, sister of mercy, theosophist, mason
- Amina Taher (born 1983), Emirati airline marketing executive, businesswoman, and women's rights advocate
- Amina Tyler (born 1994), Tunisian activist associated with Femen
- Amina Wadud (born 1952), American feminist
- Amina Wali, Pakistani alpine skier
- Amina Yuguda, Nigerian journalist
- Amina Yusifgizi (1936–2025), Azerbaijani actress
- Amina Zakari (born 1960), Nigerian politician
- Amina Zaripova (born 1976), Russian rhythmic gymnast
- Amina Zaydan (born 1966), Egyptian novelist and short story writer
- Amina Zidani (born 1993), French boxer
- Amina Zoubir (born 1983), Algerian artist
- Amina Khan (born 2002), Escape Room supervisor

=== Aminah ===
- Aminah Assilmi (1945–2010), American broadcast journalist
- Aminah Cendrakasih (1938–2022), Indonesian actress
- Aminah McCloud (born 1948), American Professor of Religious Studies and Islamic World Studies
- Aminah Robinson (1940–2015), American artist
- Amīnah al-Saʿīd (1914–1995), Egyptian journalist and women's rights activist

=== Amena ===
- Amena Begum (1925–1989), Pakistani politician, former MP of East Pakistan
- Amena Khan (born 1983), British-Indian model and fashion designer

=== Ameena ===
- Ameena Ahmad Ahuja, Indian painter, calligrapher, writer and linguist
- Ameena Begum (1892–1949), birth name Ora Ray Baker, wife of Sufi Master Inayat Khan
- Ameena Begum (politician), Bangladeshi politician and Member of Parliament
- Ameena Hussein (born 1964), Sri Lankan sociologist, novelist, editor
- Ameena Saiyid, Pakistani publisher
- Ameena, Indian trafficking victim of the Ameena case

=== Ameenah ===
- Ameenah Gurib (born 1959), 6th President of the Republic of Mauritius
- Ameenah Kaplan (born 1974), American actress, musician and choreographer

=== Amineh ===
- Amineh Kakabaveh (born 1970), Swedish politician of Iranian Kurdish descent
- Amineh Kazemzadeh (born 1963), Iranian painter

== Fictional characters ==
- Amina, a sleepwalking character in the opera La sonnambula
- Ameena Badawi, in TV series EastEnders
- Amina Hydrose, in the 1991 Indian film Amina Tailors
- Amina Abdallah Arraf al Omari, fictional character or hoax persona created and maintained by American Tom MacMaster
- A character in The Equalizer 3
- Lead character in British sitcom We Are Lady Parts.

== See also ==
- The dictionary definition of Amina at Wiktionary
- Amna
- Iman (Islam)
