= Amna =

Amna or Aamna (Arabic: [ˈʔæ(ː)mnæ]) is an Arabic feminine given name that means safe, caring, and honest. It is a variant transliteration of Amina. Notable people with the name include:

== Given name ==
- Aamna Sardar, Pakistani politician
- Aamna Sharif (born 1982), Indian actress
- Amna Akbar, American academic and professor of law
- Amna Babar (born 1992), Pakistani supermodel
- Amna Elsadik Badri, Sudanese academic, writer, and activist for women's rights
- Amna Buttar (born 1962), Pakistani American physician and politician
- Amna Fayyaz (born 2002), Pakistani squash player
- Amna Guellali (born 1972), Libyan-Tunisian human rights activist
- Amna Al Haddad (born 1989), Emirati weightlifter
- Amna Ilyas (born 1990), Pakistani film and television actress, and model
- Amna Mahmoud Al-Jaidah (1913–2000), Qatari teacher
- Amna Mawaz Khan (born 1989), Pakistani classical dancer of Bharatnatyam
- Amna Mufti, Pakistani screenwriter and columnist
- Amna Al-Nasiri (born 1970), Yemeni visual artist, art critic, and academic
- Amna Nawaz (born 1979), American broadcast journalist
- Amna Nurhusein, Eritrean politician
- Amna Parveen, Pakistani politician
- Amna Al Qubaisi (born 2000), Emirati female racing driver
- Amna Riaz (born 1990), Pakistani YouTuber
- Amna Shah, Canadian politician
- Amna Al Shamsi, Emirati politician
- Amna Suleiman (born 1981/82), Palestinian cyclist and instructor
- Amna Sharif Tariq (born 1989), Kuwaiti cricketer
- Amna bint Abdulaziz bin Jassim Al Thani, Qatari businesswoman

== See also ==
- Amina (given name)
- Amina (disambiguation)
