= Baku Slavic University =

University in Azerbaijan

- Established: 1946
- Rector: Anar Nagiyev
- Location: Baku, Azerbaijan; 40°23′02″N 49°50′37″E
- Website: bsu-uni.edu.az

Baku Slavic University (BSU) (Azerbaijani: Bakı Slavyan Universiteti) is a public university located in Baku, Azerbaijan.

At the university, specializing in the study of Slavic and German languages, diplomats, philologists-teachers, translators of Russian, Polish, Czech, English, German, Bulgarian, Greek, Ukrainian, Belarusian, French, Serbian, Croatian, Slovak, Turkish, as well as specialists in international relations, diplomacy, linguistics, culture, geography, history, law, economics of these countries are trained. Baku Slavic University cooperates with universities and institutions of Eastern and Central European states and has concluded student exchange agreements with universities of the Russian Federation, Poland, Ukraine, the Czech Republic, Germany, Greece, Bulgaria, France, Slovakia, Serbia, Belarus, Croatia, Slovenia, United Kingdom, Turkey, Romania, Moldova, North Macedonia, all Central Asia countries (Kazakhstan, Kyrgyzstan, Tajikistan, Uzbekistan), the Baltic States (Latvia, Lithuania, Estonia).

The Baku Slavic University is a member of the International Personnel Academy, the Association of European Universities (Magna Charta Universitatum), the Association of Universities of the Black Sea Basin, the International Association of Teachers of Russian Language and Literature (MAPRYAL).

== History ==
1946 the Council of People's Commissars of the USSR in the Order No. 1313 dated February 2 and May 15, the decision of the Council of Ministers of the Azerbaijan Soviet Socialist Republic on the basis of a two-year Akhundov Azerbaijan State Institute of Teachers has been established. Associate professor ASLoginov was appointed head of the institute. The first academic year, 108 people were accepted to the institute. There were 28 employees of the institute.

30 July 1948 in the profession of a teacher of Russian language and literature in secondary schools of Azerbaijan holds first graduation of the specialists was held.

1952 for the preparation of teachers of Russian language, Akhundov Teachers' Institute was transformed into the Pedagogical Institute of the four-year academic term. The largest educational and scientific center of the rusistika later became a center of higher education – the preparation of teachers of Russian language and literature for secondary schools, specialized high schools, was created.

1952, 300 people were in the plan. 1952–1953 of the academic year, 40 teachers working at the institute, of which 12 people with a master's degree, associate professor, 3 of them in science class teacher, head teacher, not the degree of 10 people, 15 people were teachers.

1956–1957 in the academic year, the institute was held at five-year education system. In the initial phase of its rich history (1952–1959) Akhundov Pedagogical Institute of Russian Language and Literature of the Russian language and literature teachers for secondary schools developed into the largest specialized institution. During this period, the institute developed a teacher of Russian language and literature up to 4000.

14 April 1959 in the Central Committee of the Communist Party of Azerbaijan and the Azerbaijan SSR Council of Ministers "of the Azerbaijan Soviet Socialist Republic on development of higher pedagogical schools," the decision was adopted. According to an official document of the MF and the Azerbaijan Pedagogical Institute of Russian Language and Literature databases on the basis of the Azerbaijan Pedagogical Institute of Foreign Languages named after MF Azerbaijan Pedagogical Institute of Languages was created.

In 1959 in the composition of APDI Akhundov 15 departments with 188 professors and teachers were operating. During this period, 3700 students studied at the institute. 1966–1967 in the academic year, departments were reorganized, new faculties were created. The Faculty of Russian language and literature in two directions – the direction of the Russian language and language functioning in Azerbaijan, was established here in the department of Spanish.

1972 In the first secretary of the Central Committee of the Communist Party of Azerbaijan Heydar Aliyev and the government's initiative of 2 November 1972 on the basis of the decision No. 362 dated the Azerbaijan Pedagogical University named after MF Languages of Azerbaijan Pedagogical Institute of Russian Language and Literature Institute of the base of the same name was restored. All the training and education and scientific research institute of the department implemented 18. At that time, the education center, 280 teachers, including 6 doctors, professors and 84 candidates of sciences, senior lecturer working.

1974 in two of the faculty at the institute - # 1 for students graduating from secondary school in the Russian language, Russian language and literature, for students graduating from the Azeri language in # 2, a decision was made on the establishment of Russian language and literature departments. Scientific-research and educational institute meets goals and objectives, purposeful character and Azerbaijan National Academy of Sciences of the Coordination Council of the plan was carried out. During the period of operation of the teaching staff of the institute, the All-Union and international scale scientific-methodical conferences, seminars, and symposium probably took an active part.

=== Modern history ===
1994 in accordance with international standards of the new four-year curriculum for undergraduate training has taken place.

President of the Republic of Azerbaijan, Heydar Aliyev, 13 June 2000 in the MF in the decree on the basis of the Azerbaijan Pedagogical Institute of Russian Language and Literature is a unique educational institution in its own direction and the entire eastern region known as the rare specialties training of professional staff in carrying out the high school – was established in Baku Slavic University.

Today at Baku, Slavic University has 26 departments. University professors and teaching staff of 38 doctors, professors, 184 candidates of sciences, senior lecturer and senior lecturer and teacher, includes more than 200.

== Faculties ==
There are 5 faculties and 2 departments.

- Faculty of Pedagogy.

Bachelor in Russian literature and language with a focus of choice from:

1. Elementary teaching.
2. Primary school educators.
3. Social work and social pedagogics.
4. Preschool education and training.
- Faculty of Linguistics and foreign language teaching.

Bachelor in Linguistics (Russian/English/French/German language and literature) and Foreign language teaching (Russian/English/French/German). The chair of the faculty includes 7 departments.

- Faculty of Translation.

Bachelor in translation for the English, Greek, Russian, Bulgarian, Ukrainian, Polish and Czech languages.

- Faculty of International relations and regional studies.

Bachelor in International studies and politics with a focus on East (Russia, Ukraine, Poland) and Central Europe (Czech Republic), Balkan (Bulgaria), Greece and Turkey.

- Faculty for Azerbaijan linguistics and journalism.

Departments:

1. Master's department.
2. Dean's office for International Students.

== Base and opportunities Education ==
BSU in the "Dictionary Center", "Turkish-Slavic Relations", "Translation Problems", "International Relations" scientific-research laboratories, "The problems of Azerbaijan" was established in scientific and educational center.

University "of scientific works of BSU", "the Russian language and literature" scientific methodical journal, scientists and teachers, graduate students and magistrantların məcmuələri scientific articles are published, "Student World" newspaper is published.

Development of new educational programs in all specialties, the history of Russian literature, literary theory, practical Russian language, pedagogy, Russian linguistics and other fields of science textbooks for high school students, teaching aids have been prepared for print publication, as well as the dordcildli "Azerbaijan-Russian Dictionary" see the best examples in the book.

== Honorary degrees ==
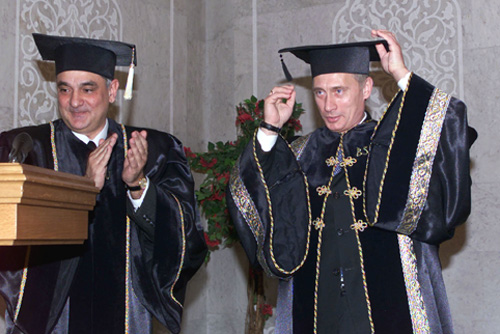
Vladimir Putin being awarded the title of "honorary doctor" at the university.

2000 in the Baku Slavic University, "honorary doctor" s name has been established. The strengthening of friendship and cooperation between the countries and peoples, science, education and culture in the work performed great services for the development of a number of prominent state and public and political figures in the decision of the Scientific Council of BSU was awarded the honorary title. Today, the President of the Russian Federation Vladimir Putin, Patriarch of Moscow and All Russia II Aleksiy, the Ukrainian Rada Speaker VPlyusc, chairman of the Federation Council of Russia Sergei Mironov, the Presidents of Bulgaria Jelyu Zhelev (1990–1997) and Georqi Parvanov, the president of Greece KStefanopulos, Ukrainian President Viktor Yushchenko and the Polish President Lech Kaczynski Honorary Doctors of Baku Slavic University .

== International relations ==
BSU multilateral relations with many foreign countries has established high schools. The University External Relations Russia, France, Ukraine, Bulgaria, Czech Republic, Poland, Greece and other countries, the prestigious higher educational institutions, signed contracts and agreements shall be governed by the scientific and public organizations. Named after AS Pushkin State Russian Language Institute of Baku Slavic University (Moscow, Russia), regional Academy of Personnel Management (Ukraine, Kyiv), Slavic University (Ukraine, Kyiv), "Ovidius" University (Greece, constant), University of Shumen (Bulgaria, Shumen ), named after BXmelnitski Cerkask State University (Ukraine, Cerkassk), Moscow State International Relations Institute (Moscow, Russia), Institute of INALKO Eastern languages and cultures (France, Paris) has signed contracts with.

2002–2003 BSU in the Ministry of Education and the Russian Federation Embassy of the republican scientific-practical conference with the actual problems of teaching Russian language and literature in secondary schools have been removed from the agenda, the ways to solve these problems are investigated, and the resolution was adopted.

Educational-Cultural Center of the University of Ukraine, Russia, Educational and Cultural Center ("the Moscow audience"), Turkish Studies Center, Center for Modern Greek language and mədniyyəti, Bulgarian and Polish language and culture center of the active center and mədniyyəti function.

The university is a member of the Caucasus University Association.

== Library ==
The library has been established at the university since its foundation, 1946. Most changes at the university affected the structure of the library as well as its operation. The President of the Republic of Azerbaijan, Ilham Aliyev signed a decree for the restoration of Baku Slavic University in 2008. The major part of the funding was spent on the removal of the library to the new area.

== Student life ==
BSU has been repaired to a higher level assembly hall, conference hall, library and sports hall used by the students. Students from various amateur associations, scientific organizations, SHK-or, were involved in the sports sections. Athletes, students, especially volleyball, handball and basketball teams are among the winners of the Spartakiadası and Universiadasının. Ozunuidarəsinin model student groups have been created.

Students are involved in university management, are interested in the proposals. In this regard, at the initiative of the rector of the "One-day caliph" particularly important and memorable event. On 13 December every year since 2002, the rector, prorektorlar, deans and department responsibilities mudirlərinin magistrantlar of students and university life, and thus canlandırmıslar new ideas. Student self-government as a result of the day, students and students with the proposal of the Parliament of magistrantların more actively involved in the creation and university students it was decided to self-government bodies.

== Sport in Baku Slavic University ==
The students of the Baku Slavic University are engaged in the sport sections on football, basketball, volleyball, handball, tennis, badminton, field athletics, chess and others. They actively participate in the Republic and the International competitions, demonstrating excellent results. The students of the university have been honoured with cups, trophies and medals in recognition of their sport skills.

BSU students’ teams on football, basketball and volleyball took active part and have won cups and medals in Commonwealth Games among the pedagogical Universities of the CIS countries held in Moscow, Kyiv and Minsk.

== Museum ==
The university museum was established in 2000. The museum is equipped with modern technical facilities. Besides, the handwork of students such as paintings, waving artworks and other works are presented in museum. There is also a board of martyrs who died for their homeland.

== Notable alumni ==
- Eldar Gasimov – Azerbaijani Singer, winner of Eurovision Song Contest 2011. Human of year in Azerbaijan (2011)
- Telman Jafarov – PhD, vice-rector on educational issues of Baku Slavic University
- Vali Khidirov – linguist, specialist on Caucasian studies
- Kheyrulla Aghayev- researcher, writer. Editor-in-Chief of "Oil Rocks" newspaper
- Amina Yusifgizi – actress, People's Artist of Azerbaijan (1998)
