= Desert rose (crystal) =

Rose-like formation of crystal clusters of gypsum or baryte

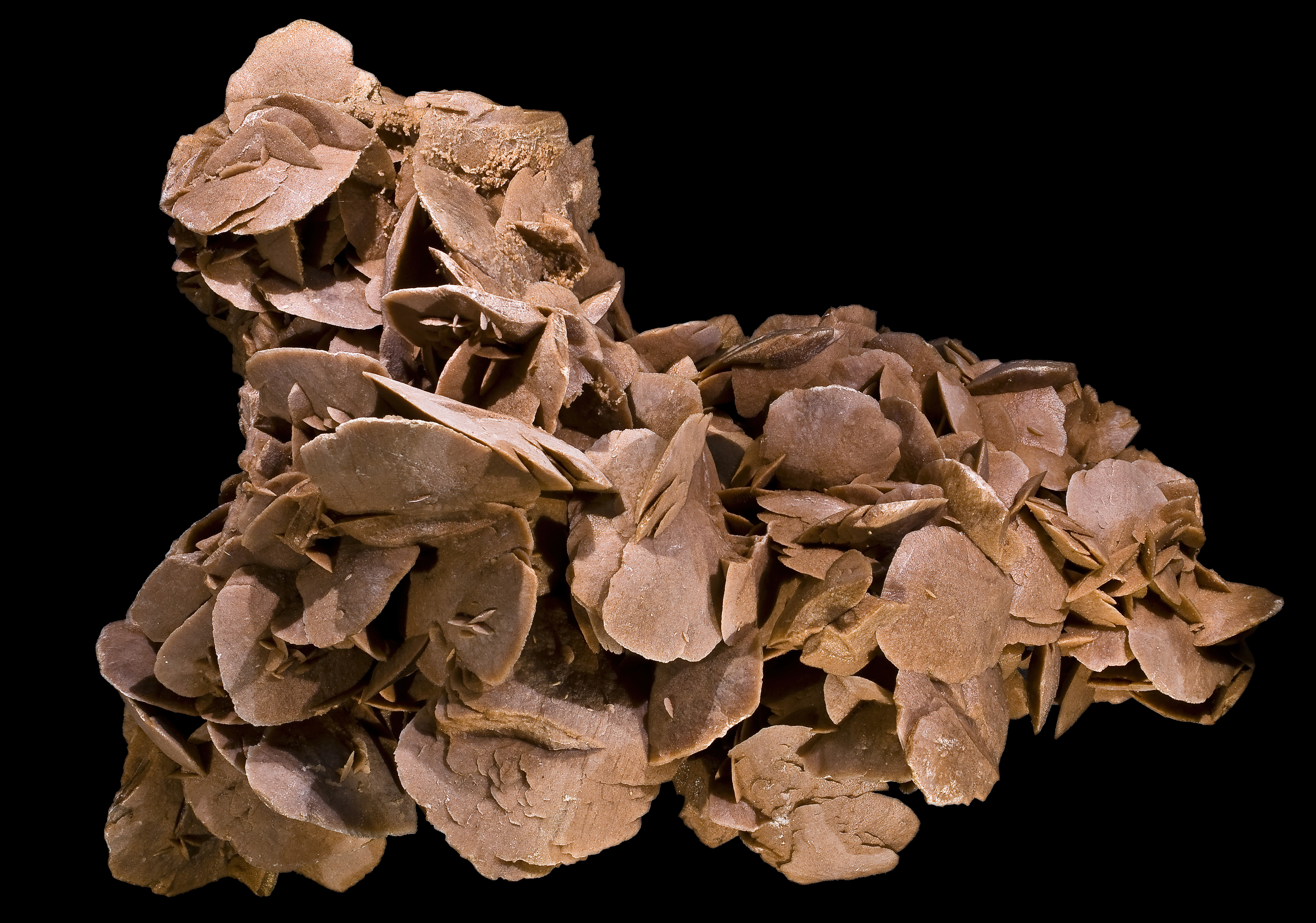
Saharan gypsum desert rose from Tunisia (length 47 cm)

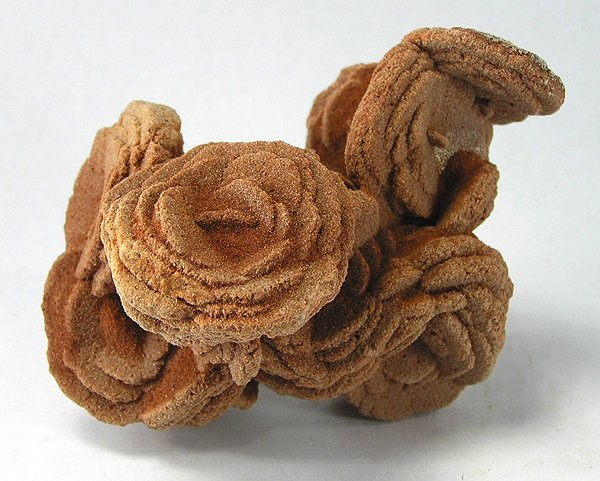
Baryte rose from Cleveland County, Oklahoma (size: 10.2 × 7.1 × 5.5 cm)

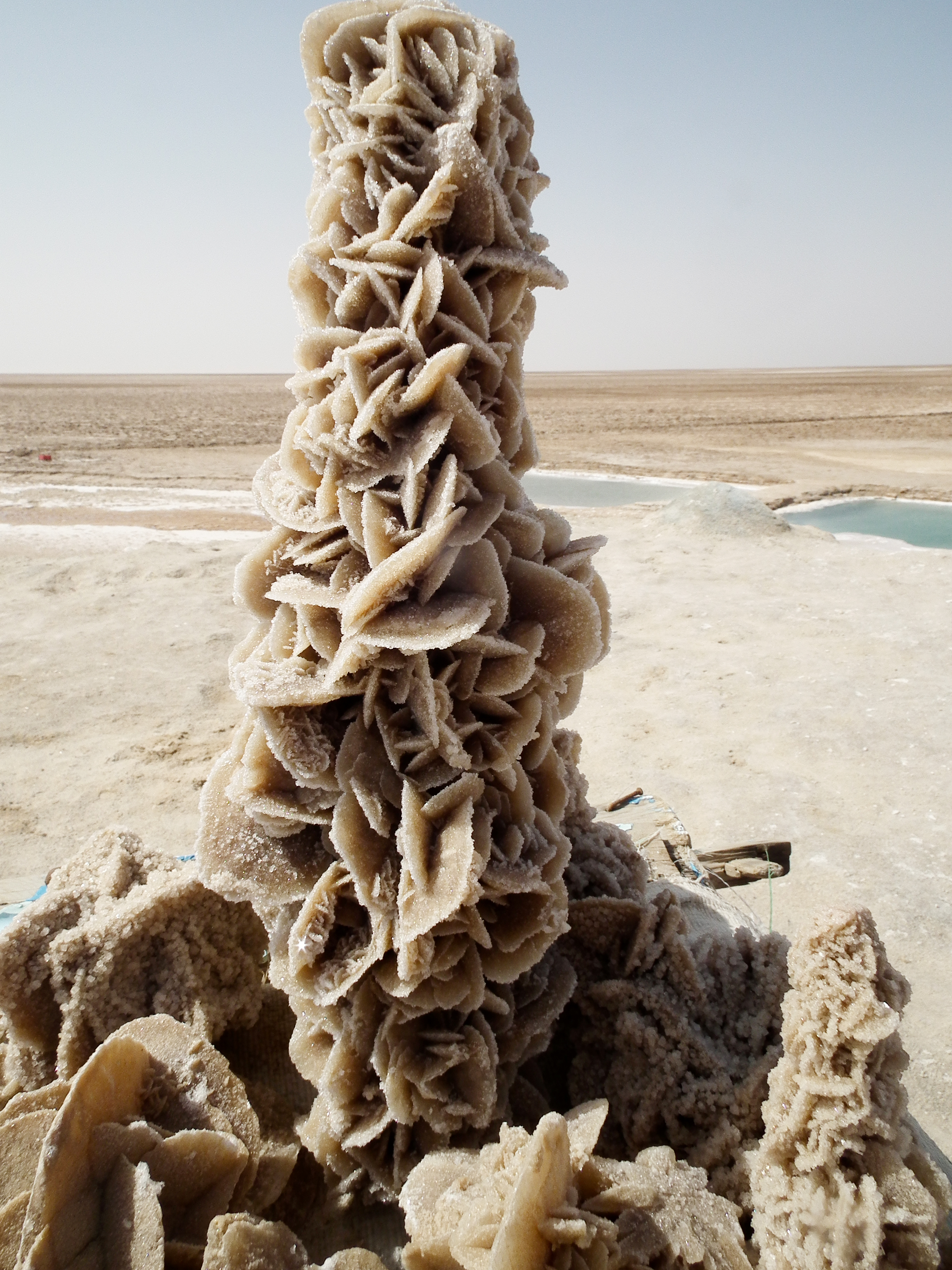
Large desert rose formation in the Tunisian desert

A desert rose, sand rose, Sahara rose, rose rock, selenite rose, gypsum rose, or baryte rose is an intricate rose-like formation of crystal clusters of gypsum or baryte, which include abundant sand grains. The "petals" are crystals flattened on the c axis, fanning open in radiating clusters.

== Description ==
The rosette crystal habit tends to occur when the crystals form in arid sandy conditions, such as the evaporation of a shallow salt basin. The crystals form a circular array of flat plates, giving the rock a shape similar to a rose blossom. Gypsum roses usually have better-defined, sharper edges than baryte roses. Celestine and other bladed evaporite minerals may also form rosette clusters. They can appear either as a single rose-like bloom or as clusters of blooms, typically ranging from pea-sized to 10 centimetres (4 in) in diameter.

The ambient sand that is incorporated into the crystal structure, or otherwise encrusts the crystals, varies with the local environment. If iron oxides are present, the rosettes take on a rusty tone.

== Locations ==
=== Sahara ===
Sand roses are found in large numbers in the surroundings of the salt lake of Chott el Djerid in southwest Tunisia, as well as the neighboring regions in Algeria and Ghadames, Libya. Local inhabitants extract them and sell them as souvenirs to tourists, creating a sustainable income for the local population. Other sandroses are found elsewhere in the Sahara, but those extracted in the surroundings of the salt lake are particularly beautiful because of the high percentage of salt in their composition making them more crystalline and luminous. Others that contain more sand have a rusty tone and are hence less brilliant in light. Sand roses are also found in the vicinity of Abqaiq, Saudi Arabia.

=== Oklahoma ===
Rose rock in Oklahoma was formed during the Permian Period, 250 million years ago, when western and central Oklahoma was covered by a shallow sea. As the sea retreated, baryte precipitated out of the water and crystallized around grains of quartz sand. This left behind a large formation of reddish sandstone, locally called Garber Sandstone, containing deposits of rose rock.

The rose rock was selected as the official rock of Oklahoma in 1968.

== Size ==
Typically, desert roses measure from 13 to 25 millimetres (1/2–1 inch) in diameter. The largest recorded by the Oklahoma Geological Survey was 43 centimetres (17 in) across and 25 cm (10 in) high, weighing 57 kg (125 lb). Clusters of rose rocks up to one metre (39 in) tall and weighing more than 450 kg (1,000 lb) have been found.

== See also ==
- National Museum of Qatar
