= Amina Srarfi =

Tunisian politician and musician, born 1958

Amina Srarfi أمينة الصرارفي
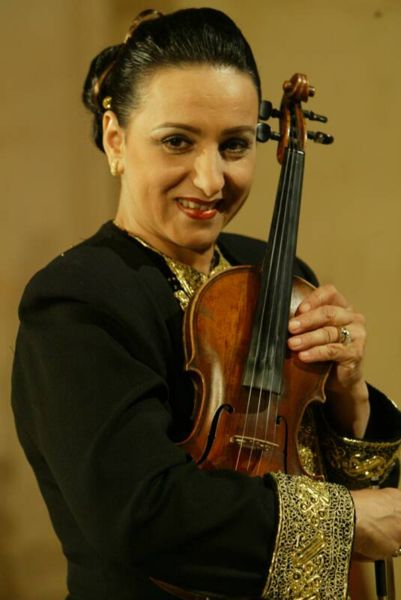

Background information
- Born: 1958 (age 67–68); Tunis
- Genres: Western classical music, Arabic music
- Occupations: Musician and orchestra director, Minister of Cultural Affairs
- Instruments: Violin, vocals
- Years active: 1988–present
- Member of: Tunisian Symphony Orchestra, El'Azifet orchestra
- Spouse: Fayçal Karoui

Amina Srarfi (Arabic: أمينة الصرارفي, born 1958 in Tunis), is a Tunisian musician and the first woman conductor of a symphony orchestra in Tunisia.

On 25 August 2024, she was nominated Minister of Cultural Affairs.

== Life ==
=== Early life and education ===
Srarfi started in music when she was a child; her father Kaddour Srarfi was a violinist, conductor and composer of classical Arabic music. She graduated in Arabic music in 1979 and later obtained the first prize for violin and a university degree in musicology. She also took conducting courses in Paris. Srarfi made her professional debut in teaching for ten years. Then in 1988, she decided to create and direct a private music school with her father's name: the Conservatoire Kaddour Srarfi of Music and Dance.

=== Singer and choir director ===
Since 1982, Srarfi has been a member of the Tunisian Symphony Orchestra. She also has directed the children's choir for Tunisian television and radio programs (RTCI). In 1984, during the Festival of the Medina, she was voted best singer in the category of musical heritage. A year later, she appeared as a singer at the Carthage International Festival under the baton of Abdelhamid Ben Aljia and also sang at the Olympia in Paris.

=== Chef d'orchestre ===
In 1992, she created the first all female orchestra for classical music El'Azifet and directed it herself – a first in the Arabic music scene. Her husband, Fayçal Karoui, serves as artistic advisor and composer of the ensemble. who, through his writing and his new vision of music, using classical Arabic to update the directory and create a directory to its own orchestra. Srarfi has conducted the El'Azifet orchestra at concerts in Paris, Madrid, London, Cairo, Washington, D.C. New York, Stockholm, Hanover, Vienna, Algiers, Istanbul, Beijing and Seoul.

In 1997 she was elected president of the commission for music in the International Council of Women. The same year, she organized an event entitled "Women in Music in the Mediterranean" in collaboration with the National Union of Tunisian Women. This event brought together fourteen orchestras from all over the Mediterranean basin.

On 25 August 2024, she was nominated Minister of Cultural Affairs.

== Awards ==
- 1993 Officer of Cultural Merit
- 2001 Commander of Cultural Merit
- 2008 Grand Officer of the Tunisian Republic
