= Old Amiri Palace =

Former palace in Qatar

Coordinates: 25°17′16.5″N 51°32′53.9″E

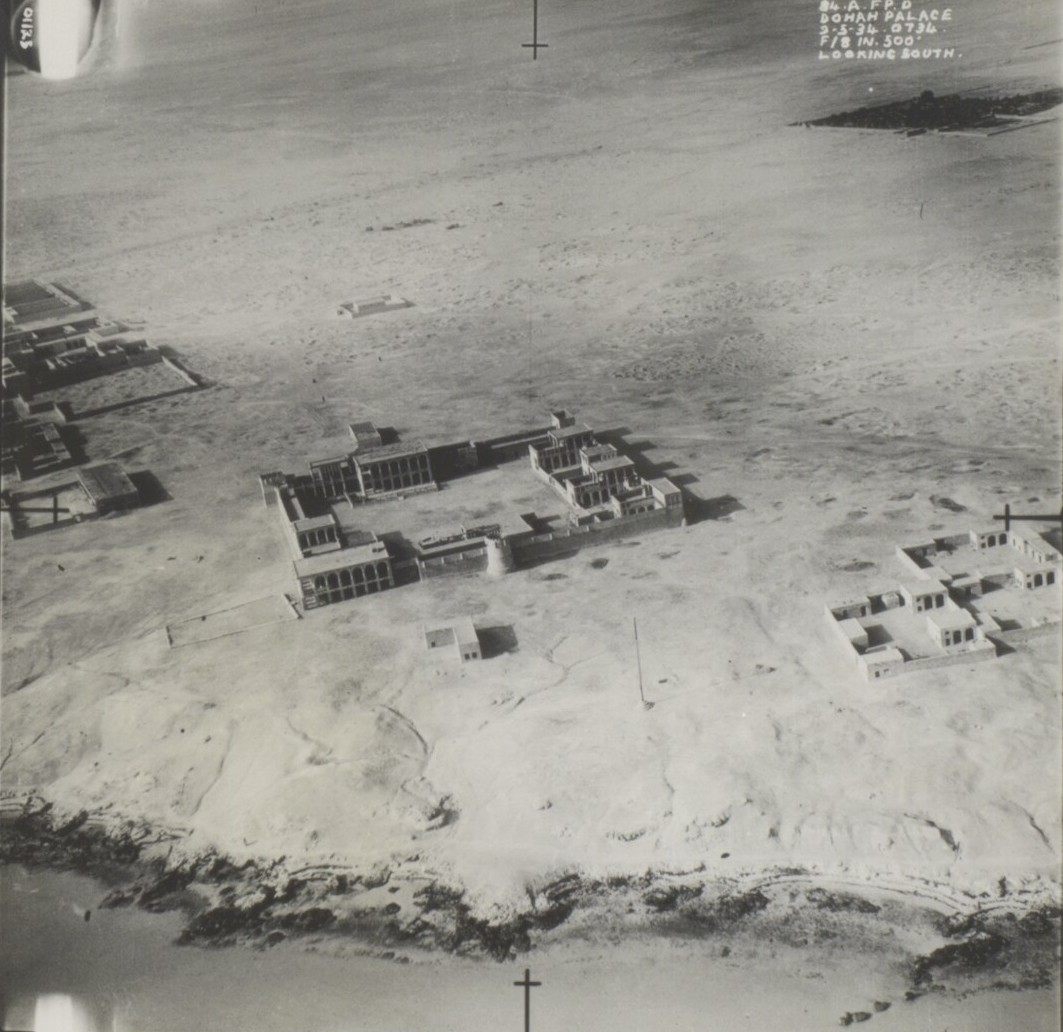
An aerial photograph of the Old Amiri Palace in 1934 taken by Royal Air Force.

The Old Amiri Palace, located in Doha, Qatar, previously served as the residence of Sheikh Abdullah bin Jassim Al Thani during the early 20th century. It became defunct in 1923 when Abdullah bin Jassim shifted his seat of government to the then-abandoned Ottoman fort of Qal'at al-Askar. In 1972, it was decided that it would be converted into a museum, culminating in the National Museum of Qatar.

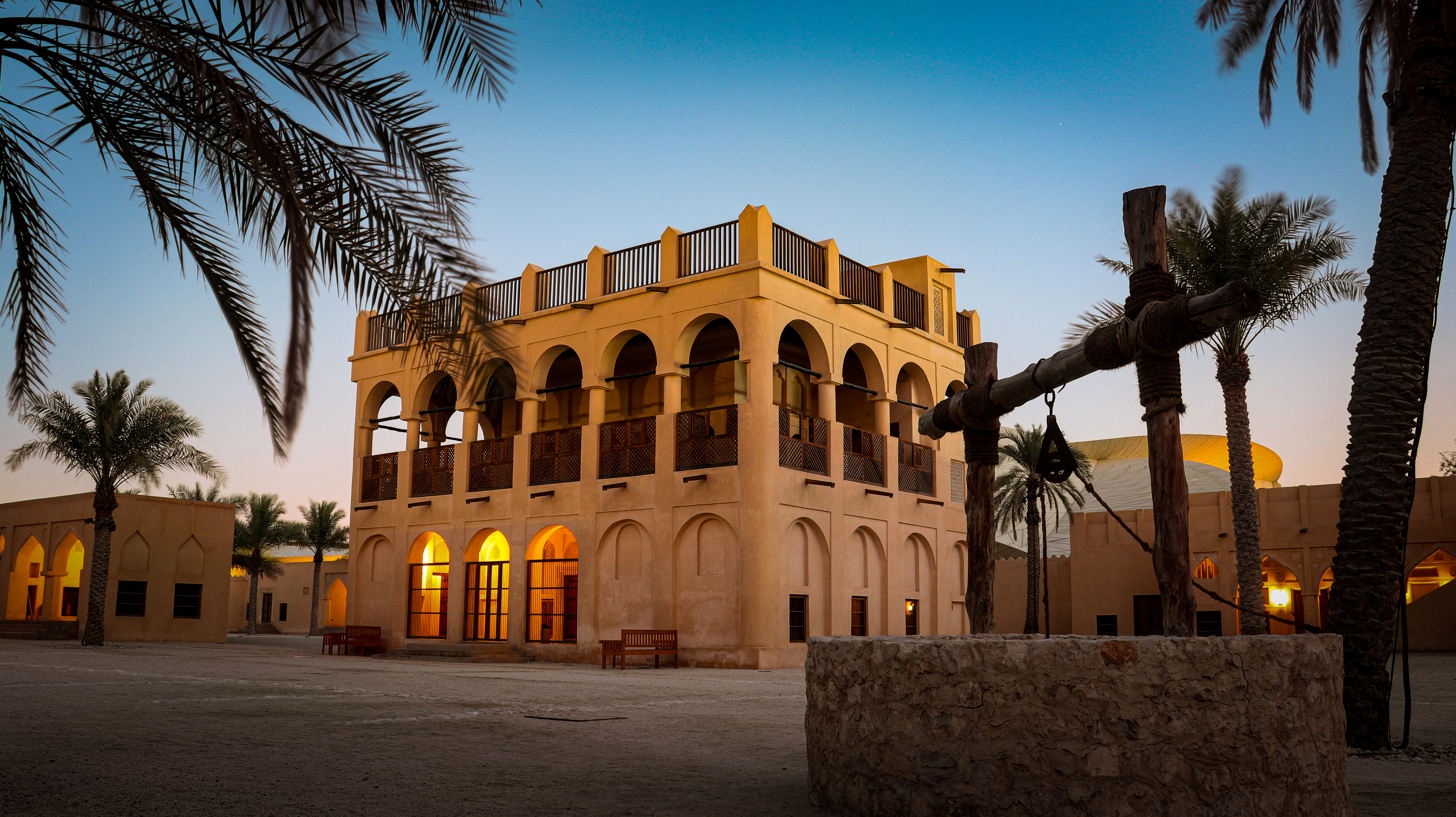
Old Palace

== History ==
In late 1871, the Qatar Peninsula fell under Ottoman control after Sheikh Jassim bin Mohammed Al Thani, ruler of the peninsula, acquiesced to control in exchange for protection from the Sheikhs of Bahrain and Abu Dhabi and agreed to fly the Ottoman flag at his residence. In January 1872, Qatar was formally incorporated into the Ottoman Empire as a province in Najd with Sheikh Jassim being appointed its kaymakam (sub-governor). Sheikh Jassim was allowed to continue presiding over most local affairs. Shortly after their arrival, the Ottomans established a permanent presence at Qal'at al-Askar, a fort built on a slightly elevated area in central Doha. As the de facto ruler, Sheikh Jassim established his headquarters at Fereej Al Salata, a seaside district that provided suitable harborage.

Sheikh Jassim died in 1913 and Sheikh Abdullah bin Jassim Al Thani was to take up his mantle as the ruler of Qatar. The Ottomans withdrew from Qatar in 1915 and Qatar became a British protectorate in 1916; Sheikh Abdullah's ruling of the peninsula was recognized by the British. Throughout the end of Sheikh Jassim's and the beginning of Sheikh Abdullah's reign, the family palace frequently received upgrades and expansions. Finally, in 1923, Sheikh Abdullah decided to shift the seat of government to the now-abandoned Qal'at al-Askar, which eventually became known as the Amiri Diwan. Almost 50 years later, Sheikh Khalifa bin Hamad Al Thani began the process of converting the defunct palace into a museum, resulting in the establishment of the National Museum of Qatar in 1975.

== Description ==
As mentioned previously, the palace was continuously improved throughout the years with no defined master plan. In 2010, the following sections of the palace were identified:

- Sheikh Abdullah's family residence
- Sheikh Hamed's family residence
- Sheikh Ali's family residence
- Guard's residence
- Mosque custodian's residence
- East Gatehouse residence
- North gatehouse residence
- Small majlis
- Inner majlis
