= National Museum of Qatar =

- View of the National Museum of Qatar in 2025
- Established: Opened 28 March 2019
- Location: Doha, Qatar
- Coordinates: 25.2879°N 51.5494°E
- Type: Museum
- Director: Sheikh Abdulaziz H. Al Thani
- Architect: Jean Nouvel
- Owner: Qatar Museums Authority
- Website: nmoq.org.qa/en/

The National Museum of Qatar is a national museum in Doha, Qatar. The current building opened to the public on 28 March 2019, replacing the previous building which opened in 1975. The building was designed by the French architect Jean Nouvel who was inspired by the desert rose crystal, which is found in Qatar. The museum site includes Sheikh Abdullah bin Jassim Al Thani's palace, which is the heart of the Qatari national identity.

== Collection ==
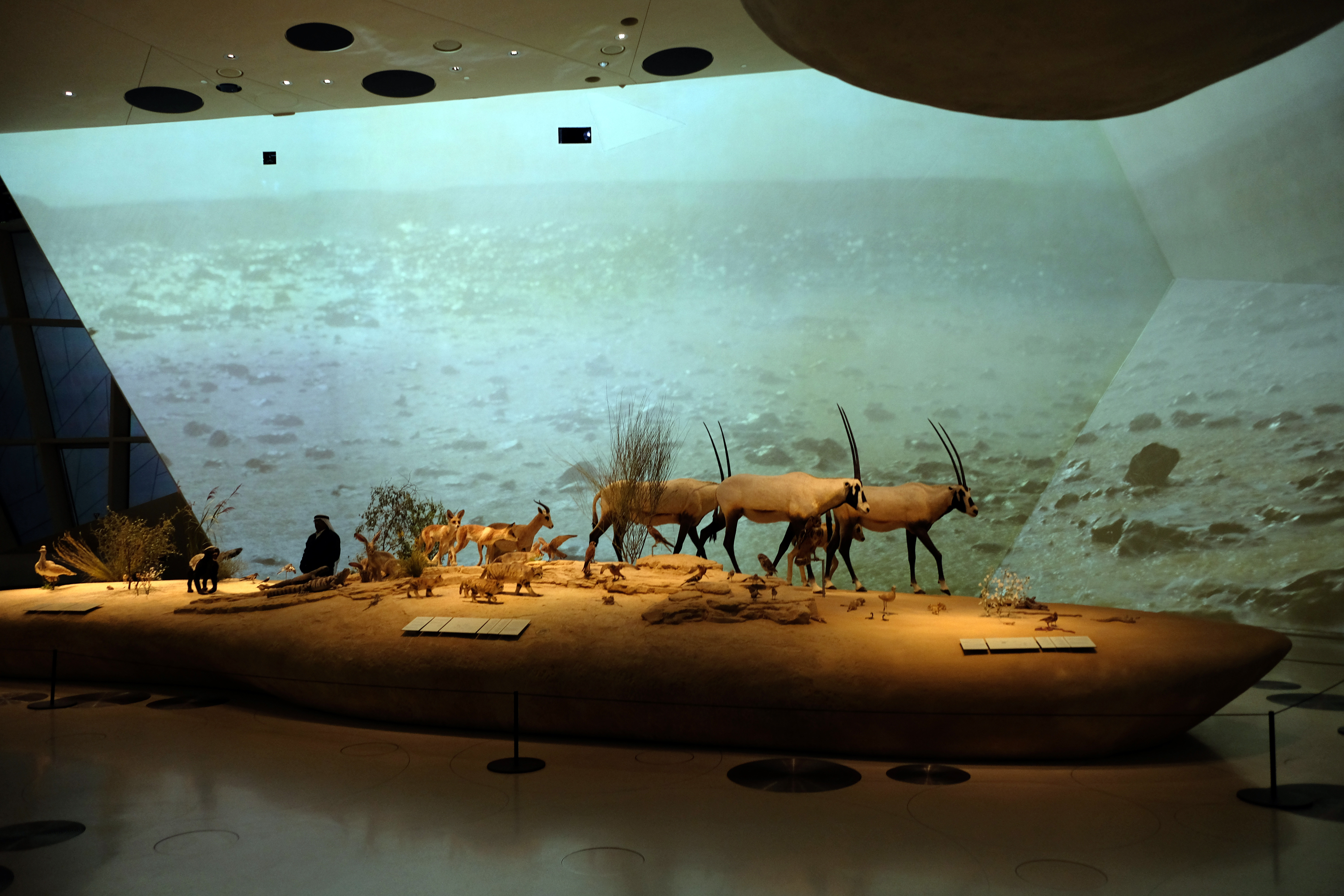
Natural History Gallery

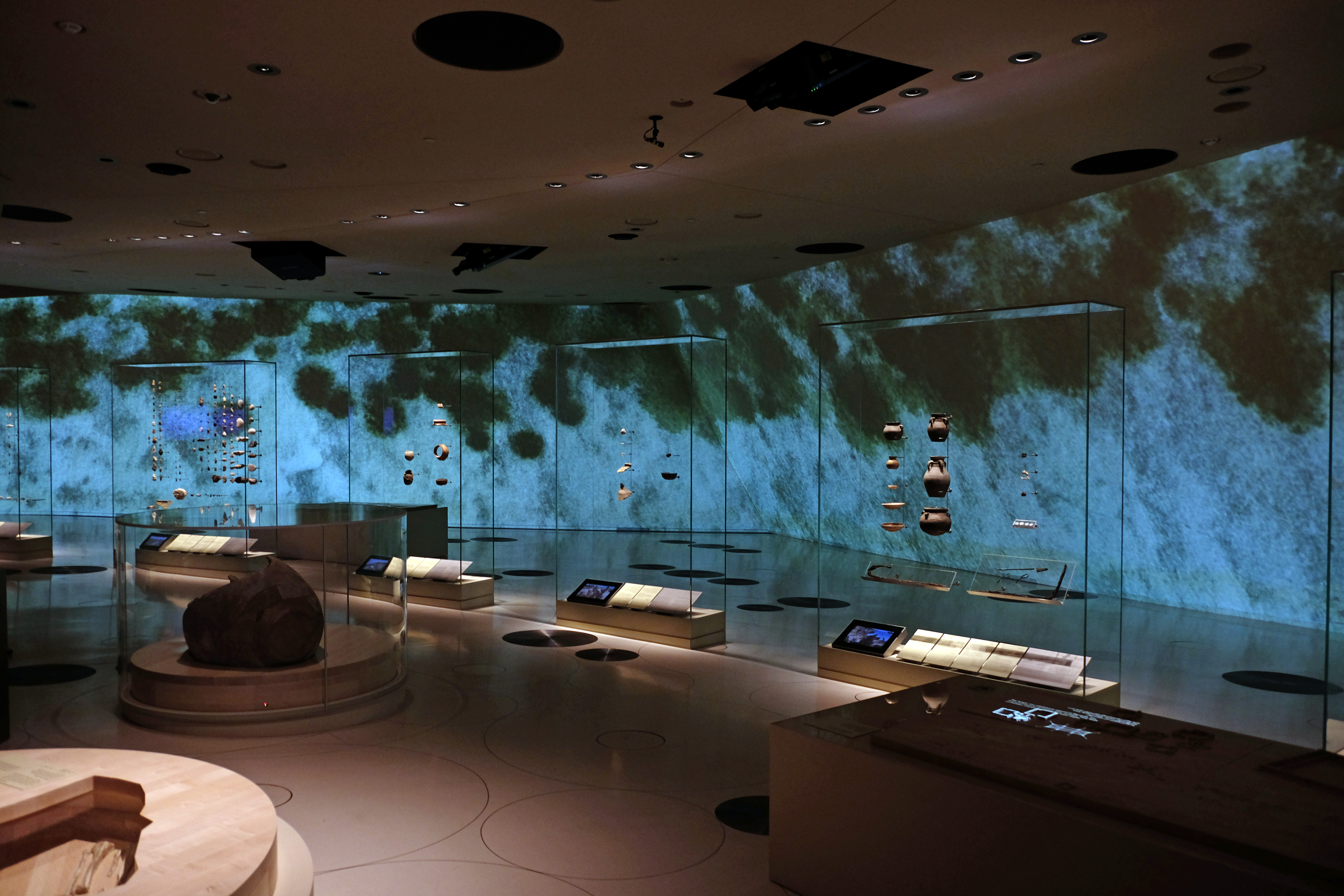
National Museum Gallery

A tour of the museum takes visitors through a loop of eleven permanent galleries that address three major, interrelated themes and one temporary exhibition space. The galleries are loosely arranged in chronological order, beginning with exhibitions on the natural history of the desert and the Persian Gulf, artefacts from Bedouin culture, historical exhibitions on the tribal wars, the establishment of the Qatari state, and finally the discovery of oil to the present. The displays and installations that explore these themes present audiovisual displays with carefully selected treasures from the museum's collections. These collections currently consist of approximately 8,000 objects and include archaeological artefacts, architectural elements, heritage household and travelling objects, textiles and costumes, jewelry, decorative arts, books, and historical documents. The permanent galleries also include specially commissioned large scale films, including works by Abderrahmane Sissako and Mira Nair.

The museum's mission is to celebrate the culture, heritage, and future of Qatar and its people, embodying the pride and traditions of Qataris while offering international visitors a dialogue about rapid change and modernization.

Since its inauguration, the museum contained materials which signify Qatar's cultural heritage, such as Bedouin ethnographic materials, maritime artifacts and environmental items. Ancient artifacts, most of which are locally derived, are also housed in the museum.

=== Archaeological artifacts ===
British archaeologist Beatrice de Cardi and her team were commissioned to undertake expeditions in Qatar from November 1973 to January 1974 in order to collect artifacts to display in the museum. Their most significant discoveries were at the site of Al Da'asa, which contained numerous Ubaid potsherds dating to the Neolithic period. Artifacts from the earlier Danish expeditions launched throughout the 1950s and 1960s, previously housed at the Doha Public Library, were also put on display in the museum.

The museum's antiquities department had an active role in surveys and excavations after De Cardi's expedition ended. They excavated the archaeological sites of Al Wusail and Zubarah.

=== Ethnographic materials ===
Materials documenting Bedouin ethnography range widely in theme. Certain objects on display were historically used as tools and weapons by the Bedouin, whereas others are products such as jewellery, pottery and costumes. Traditional poems are featured in the museum; most notable are works composed by Qatari ibn al-Fuja'a and former emir Jassim bin Mohammed Al Thani.

In 2015, Sheikh Mubarak bin Saif Al Thani presented the first written draft of the anthem to the Qatar National Museum to be put on display. It was originally scheduled to be moved to the new museum upon its completion.

== History ==
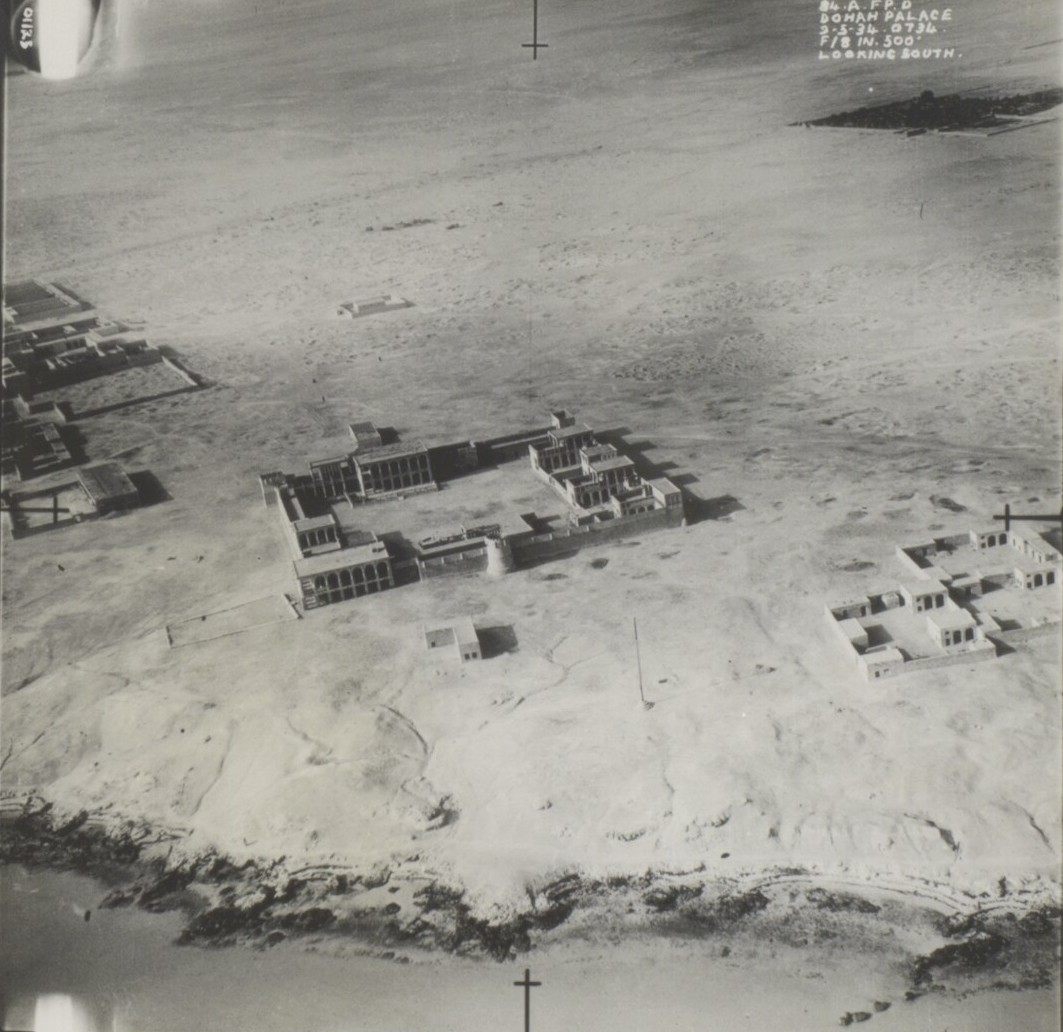
An aerial photograph of the Old Amiri Palace taken by the Royal Air Force in 1934

Upon Khalifa bin Hamad Al Thani's accession to the throne in 1972, he drew up plans for a national museum in order to document the country's heritage and traditions. That year, he contracted Michael Rice & Company to design the structural and functional aspects of the museum. It was decided that the building would enclose the Old Amiri Palace, a dilapidated early-20th-century palace previously occupied by Qatar's former emir, Abdullah bin Jassim Al Thani. A lagoon was also created to provide a venue for showcasing traditional dhows and pearling equipment.

Originally named the Qatar National Museum, it was inaugurated on 23 June 1975. Originally, its facilities included a 100-seat auditorium and a library. In 1980, the museum was awarded the Aga Khan Award for Architecture. Before the museum closed in 2007, it included a lagoon, an aquarium, archaeological and natural history facilities and a maritime museum. The royal palace which the museum was built around was refurbished in 2015 in preparation for the opening of the new museum.

An online platform called Explorer was launched in 2023 by the museum. The platform gives viewers access to online collections, an archaeology and heritage map as well as an interactive timeline of the museum.

A Memorandum of Cooperation was signed by the NMoQ’s director of partnerships and sponsorships and the director of the National Museum of Mongolia in December 2023. The cooperation also includes the "On the Move" exhibition in Mongolia in 2024, to commemorate the 25th anniversary of diplomatic relations between the two countries. In June 2026, the exhibition was opened at the National Museum of China in Beijing.

The NMoQ participated in the Expo 2023 Doha, with activities and workshops for families centred around Qatar’s traditions, culture and natural environment.

In September 2023, the Museum received the Green Apple Award for Best Environmental Practices 2023 and in July 2024, the Museum received a Carbon Neutrality Certificate.

During the 2024 Summer Olympics, the NMoQ's Jiwan restaurant provided a week's menu for Le Dalí at the Le Meurice hotel in France. The menu focuses on traditional Middle Eastern as well as regional culinary dishes.

=== New building ===
New building entrance

The new building was constructed on the site of the old building. It was designed by Pritzker Prize-winning architect Jean Nouvel who was inspired by the desert rose and grows around the original twentieth-century palace of Sheikh Abdullah bin Jassim Al Thani. The historic palace was restored by Berlin-based architecture and engineering firm ZRS Architekten Ingenieure. This important monument to Qatar's past is now preserved as the heart of the new NMoQ. The relation between the new building and the old building is part of creating the bridge between the past and the present advocated by Sheikha Al Mayassa as a way to "define ourselves instead of forever being defined by others […]" and of "celebrating our identity".

The 430,000 square foot (40,000 m^{2}) museum is made up of interlocking discs that create cavities to protect visitors from the desert heat. The building is made up of 539 intertwined discs, and its glass-fiber-reinforced concrete cladding consists of about 76,000 panels. Located on a 1.5 million ft² site at the south end of Doha's Corniche, the NMoQ building rises from the sea and is connected to the shore by two pedestrian bridges and a road bridge. At the time of the museum's reopening, the project held a LEED Gold certification and a four-star Global Sustainability Assessment System rating.

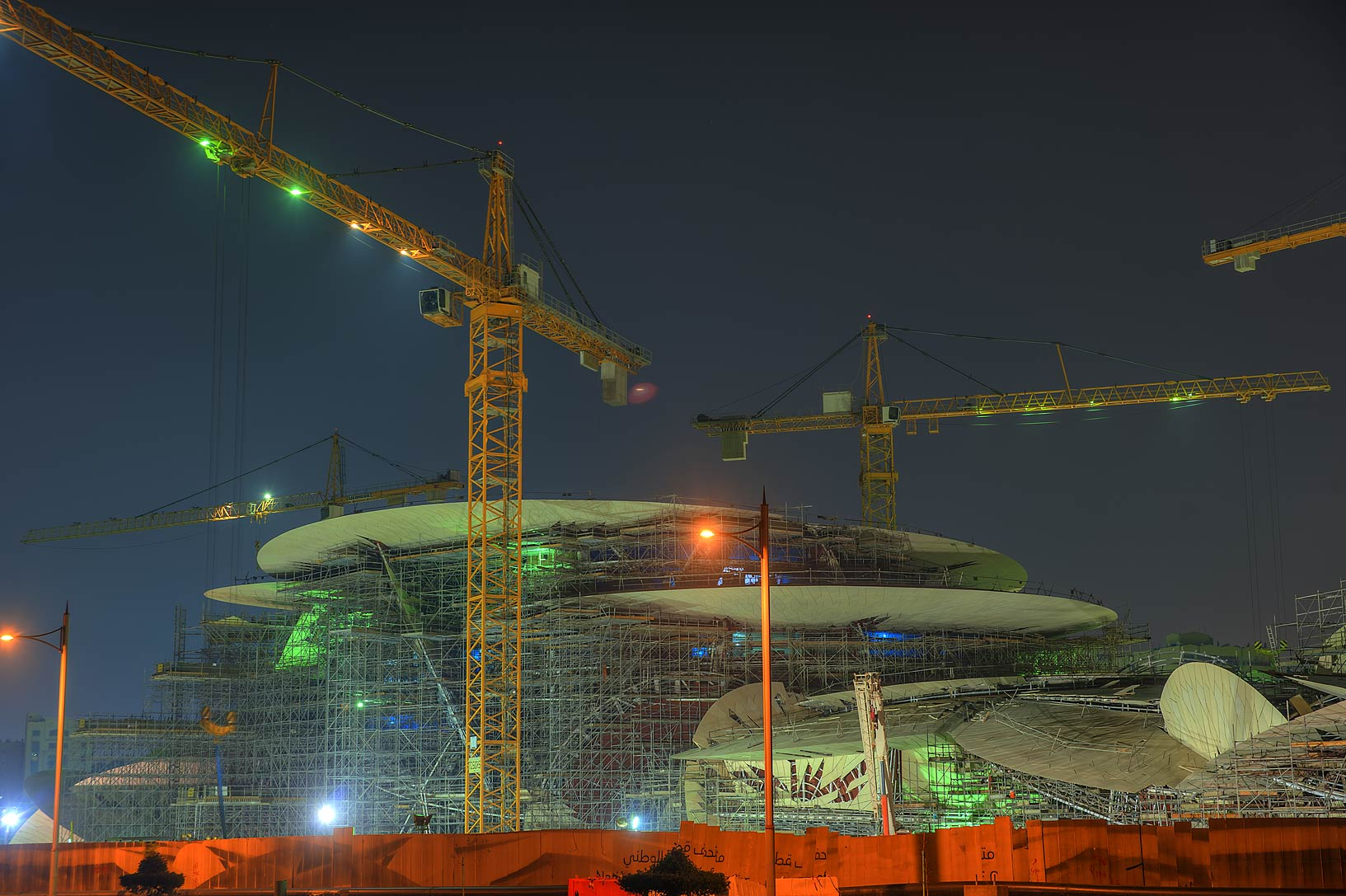
The construction site of the museum in 2015

Originally, the museum was scheduled to open in 2016, but its opening was pushed back to 28 March 2019. Time magazine named it one of the World's Greatest Places to Visit in 2019, citing the integration of "immersive video screens and dioramas" into Jean Nouvel's architectural design.

The museum welcomed more than 450,000 visitors in less than a year of its opening. The museum attracts people as it depicts Qatar's history not through paintings and sculptures but with 21st-century lights, sounds and visuals.

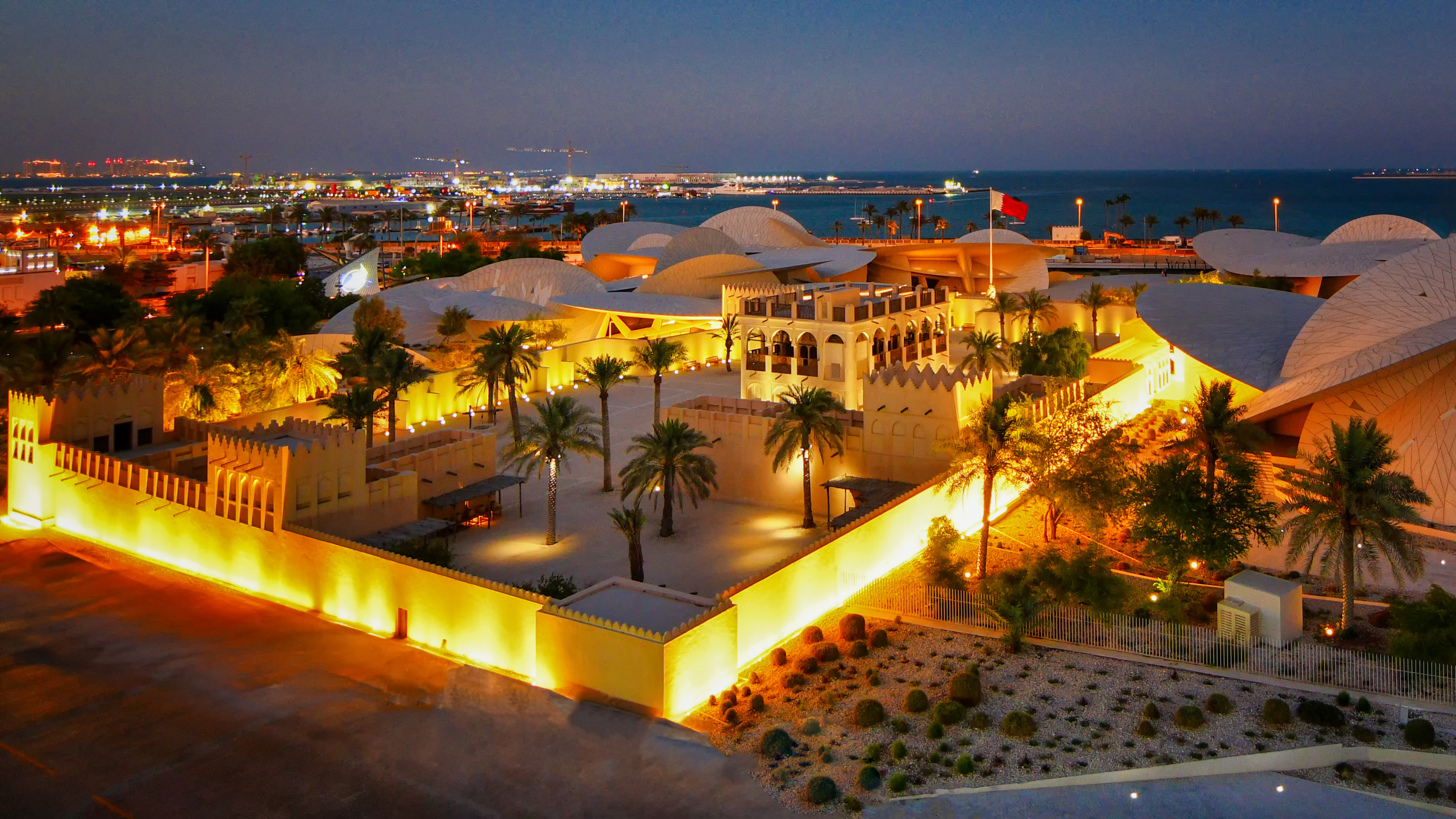
National Museum of Qatar Old Palace

==== Contractor ====
The main building was contracted to a Korea-based company; Hyundai Engineering & Construction in 2011. The project involved the construction of the new National Museum next to the existing Qatar National Museum, which is located across from the Doha Corniche. The museum is designed according to the Bedouin tradition of Qatar. It includes a building in the shape of a desert rose and a 1.2 million ft² landscaped park. The project also includes a 115,000 m^{2} park with indigenous plants, an artificial lagoon and parking spaces for 400 vehicles, a 220-seat auditorium, a research center, laboratories, a dedicated food forum, two restaurants, a café, and two museum shops, one for children. The public art at the site includes Jean-Michel Othoniel's ALFA, an installation of 114 fountain sculptures within the lagoon.

== Exhibitions ==
- "American Muscle Cars in Qatar", National Museum of Qatar, October 2021 to February 2022.
- "Seagrass Tales, Dugong Trails", National Museum of Qatar, June 2021 to September 2021.
- "Mal Lawal 3", National Museum of Qatar, June 2021 to September 2021.
- "Pipilotti Rist: Your Brain to Me, My Brain to You", curated by Tom Eccles and Bouthayna Baltaj, March 2022 to January 2023.
- "A Sneak Peek at Qatar Auto Museum Project", March 2022 to January 2023.
- "On the Move", October 2022 to January 2023.
- "The Majlis: A Meeting Place", November 2022 to March 2023.
- "HERMÈS HERITAGE: HARNESSING THE ROOTS", March 2023 to April 2023.
- Olafur Eliasson: "The curious desert", National Museum of Qatar, until August 2023.
- "The Shape of Time: Art and Ancestors of Oceania from The Metropolitan Museum of Art", October 2023 to January 2024.
- "Growing Kopi, Drinking Qahwa; Stories of Coffee in Qatar and Indonesia", October 2023 to February 2024.
- "Benchellal: Monumental Sculpting Past Tomorrow", curated by Al Shaima Ayoub, November 2024 to January 2025.
- "MANZAR: Art and Architecture from Pakistan 1940s to Today", organized by the Art Mill Museum, November 2024 to January 2025.
- "Ultraleggera: A Design Journey with Marcello Gandini", in collaboration with the Qatar Auto Museum and the Museo Nazionale dell’Automobile, April 2025 to June 2025.
- "Latino Americano | Modern and Contemporary Art from the Malba and Eduardo Costantini Collections", April 2025 to July 2025.
- "A Nation’s Legacy, A People’s Memory: Fifty Years Told", October 2025 to February 2026.
- "Countryside: A Place to Live, Not to Leave", presented at Qatar Preparatory School and the National Museum of Qatar, October 2025 to June 2026.
- "Lehmesa: Return by Moonlight", an exhibition about Qatar’s sea turtles and coastal ecosystems, October 2025 to February 2026.

== Directors ==
From 2013 to 2023, the director of the museum was Sheikha Amna. In February 2024, Sheikh Abdulaziz H. Al Thani became director of the museum.

== Gallery ==
View of National Museum of Qatar from the beach in 2020

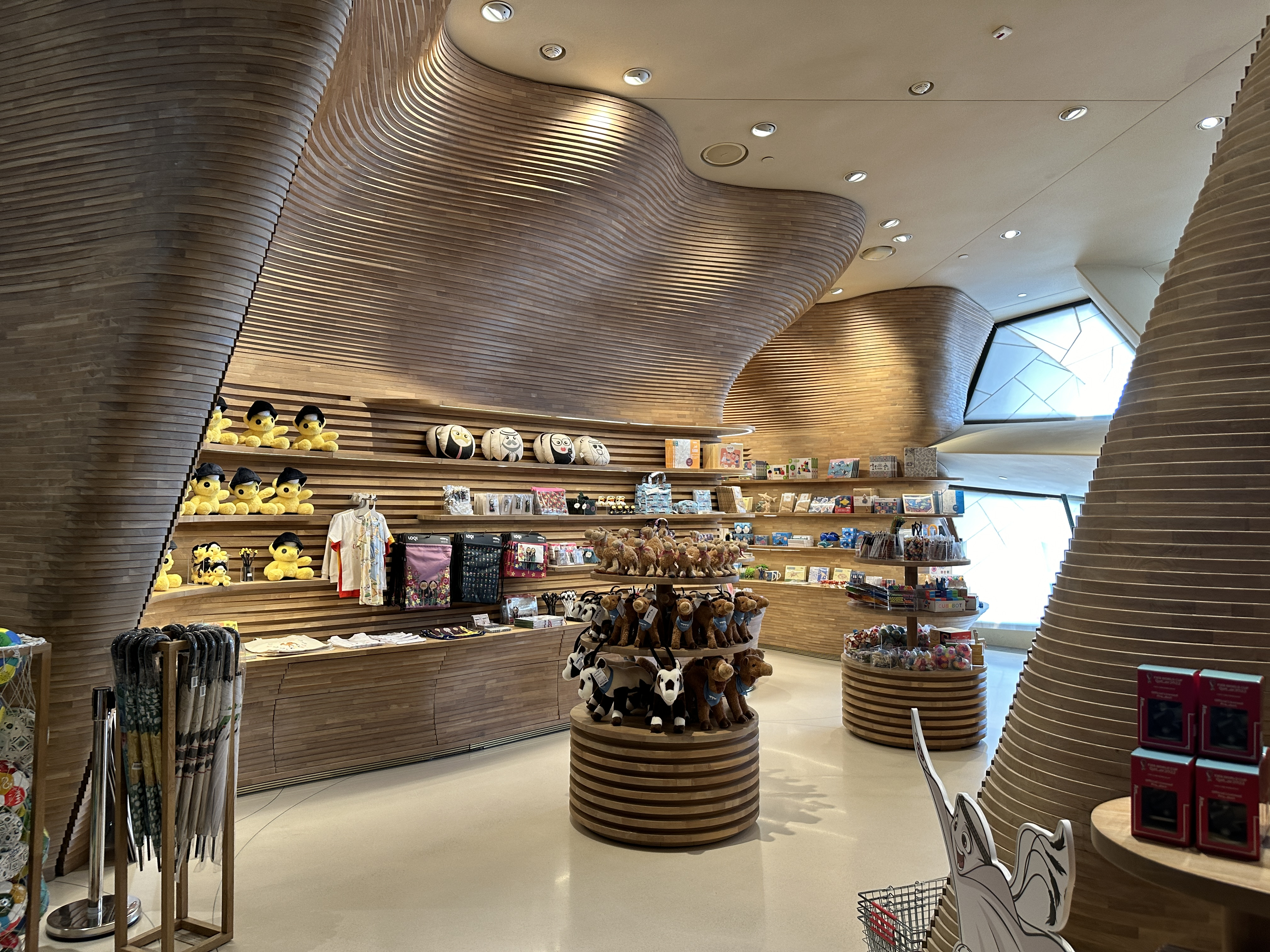
Museum Shop

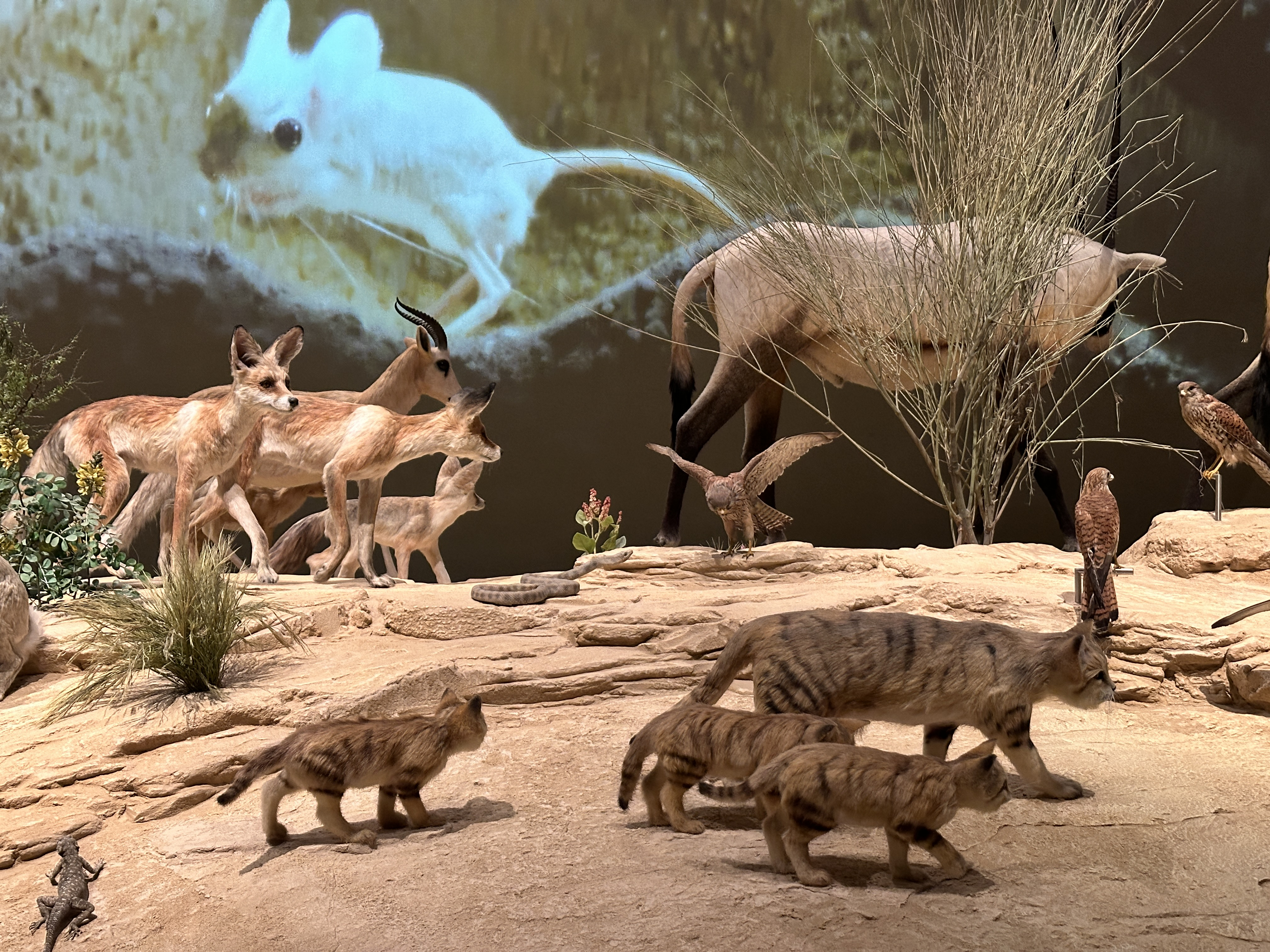
Native Animals

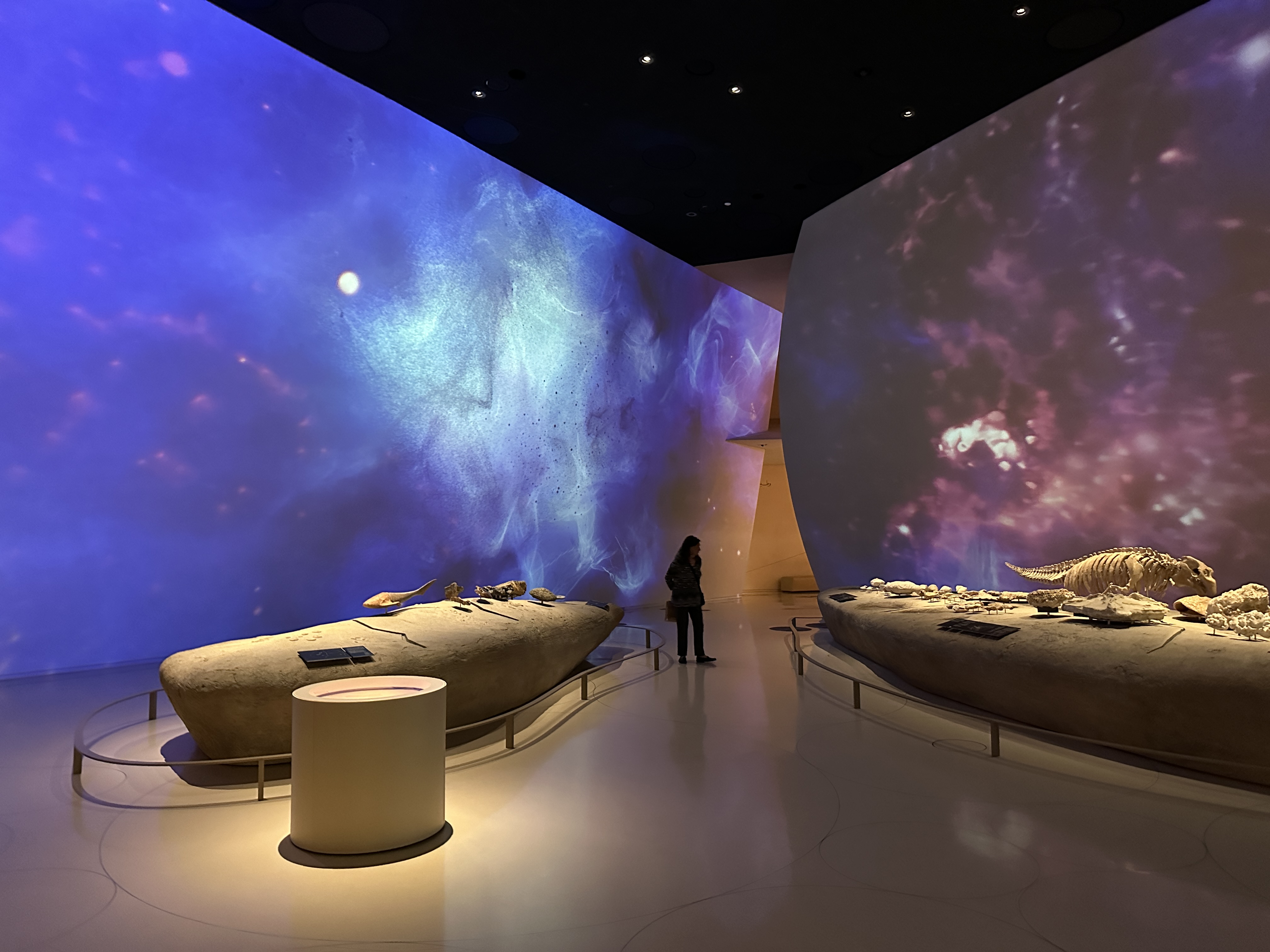
Wall Audio Visuals

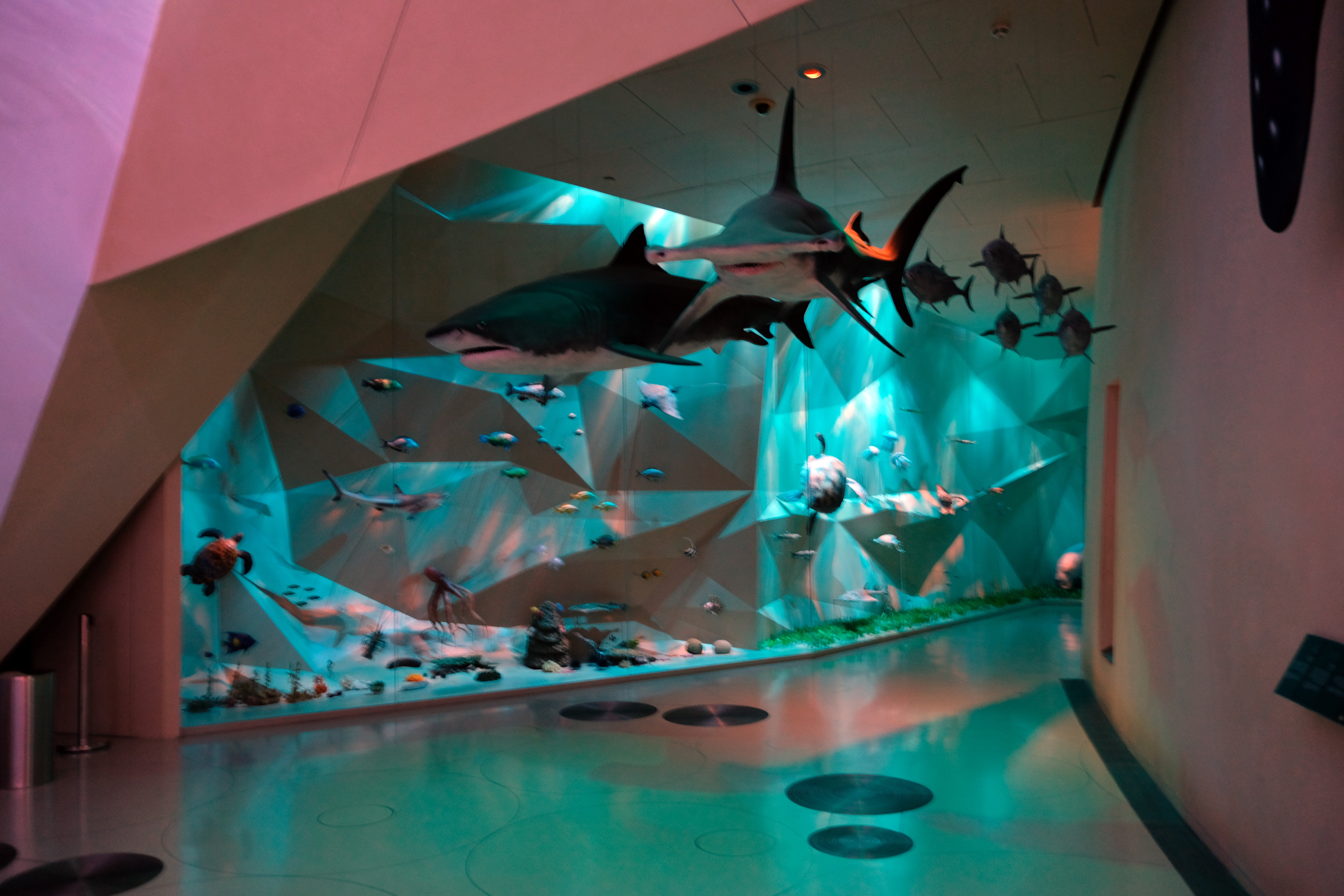
National Museum of Qatar - Interior

== See also ==
- List of museums in Qatar
- Qatar Museums
- Culture of Qatar

== Bibliography ==
- Abdul Nayeem, Muhammad (1998). Qatar Prehistory and Protohistory from the Most Ancient Times (Ca. 1,000,000 to End of B.C. Era). Hyderabad Publishers. ISBN 9788185492049.
