= Amna Suleiman =

Palestinian teacher (born 1982)

- Born: 1981 or 1982 (age 43–44); Damascus, Syria
- Occupation: Teacher
- Known for: Cycling

Amna Suleiman (Arabic: آمنه سلیمان) is a Palestinian teacher and advocate for women's cycling in Gaza. As of 2016, she leads the only women's cycling club in Gaza.

In 2016, she was profiled by BBC News as part of their BBC 100 Women series.

== Personal life ==
Suleiman was born in Damascus, Syria, and moved to Gaza in 1990s. As of 2016 she was living in Jabalia refugee camp, a Palestinian refugee camp located 3 kilometers (1.9 mi) north of Jabalia in North Gaza, where she volunteers at a local orphanage, teaches the Quran, and cycles with a local group of women.

== Role in women's cycling ==
In the region where Amna Suleiman cycles, the Gaza Strip, the custom is for women to not ride their bike past the age of puberty. Suleiman began cycling in 2015 for health reasons and to remind herself of better times in her childhood. Soon after, she established what is considered to be the first women's cycling club riding under the Hamas party's administration in Gaza.

Women's participation in sports has been restricted in the Gaza strip since the Hamas party came to power. According to Ahmad Muheisin, an official in Gaza’s youth and sports ministry office, women's cycling is considered to be a “violation” of Gazan values. Some have noted that it was more common for women to ride bikes in Gaza before the mid-1980s.

Suleiman advocates for women to continue riding bicycles after puberty, and has been quoted in The New York Times telling young women in Gaza that they should insist to their future husbands permission to cycle be a condition of their marriage. She says she hopes that one day women will be able ride a bicycle without stigma and disapproval.
