= Amina Chifupa =

Tanzanian politician

Honourable Amina Chifupa MP

Member of Parliament
- In office 2006–2007
- Constituency: None (Special Seat)

Personal details
- Born: 20 May 1981 Mwanza Region, Tanzania
- Died: 26 June 2007 (aged 26)
- Party: CCM
- Occupation: Politician
- Portfolio: Amina was born on May 20, 1981 and attended primary school in Mwanza. She completed her schooling in Dar-es-Salaam in 2001. Soon after that, she worked with the Dar es Salaam-based Radio Clouds FM as a broadcaster. She held the post until she ventured into politics in 2005 through the CCM youth wing.

Amina Chifupa (20 May 1981 – 26 June 2007) was a Tanzanian CCM politician and a special seat Member of Parliament.
