= Fayçal Karoui =

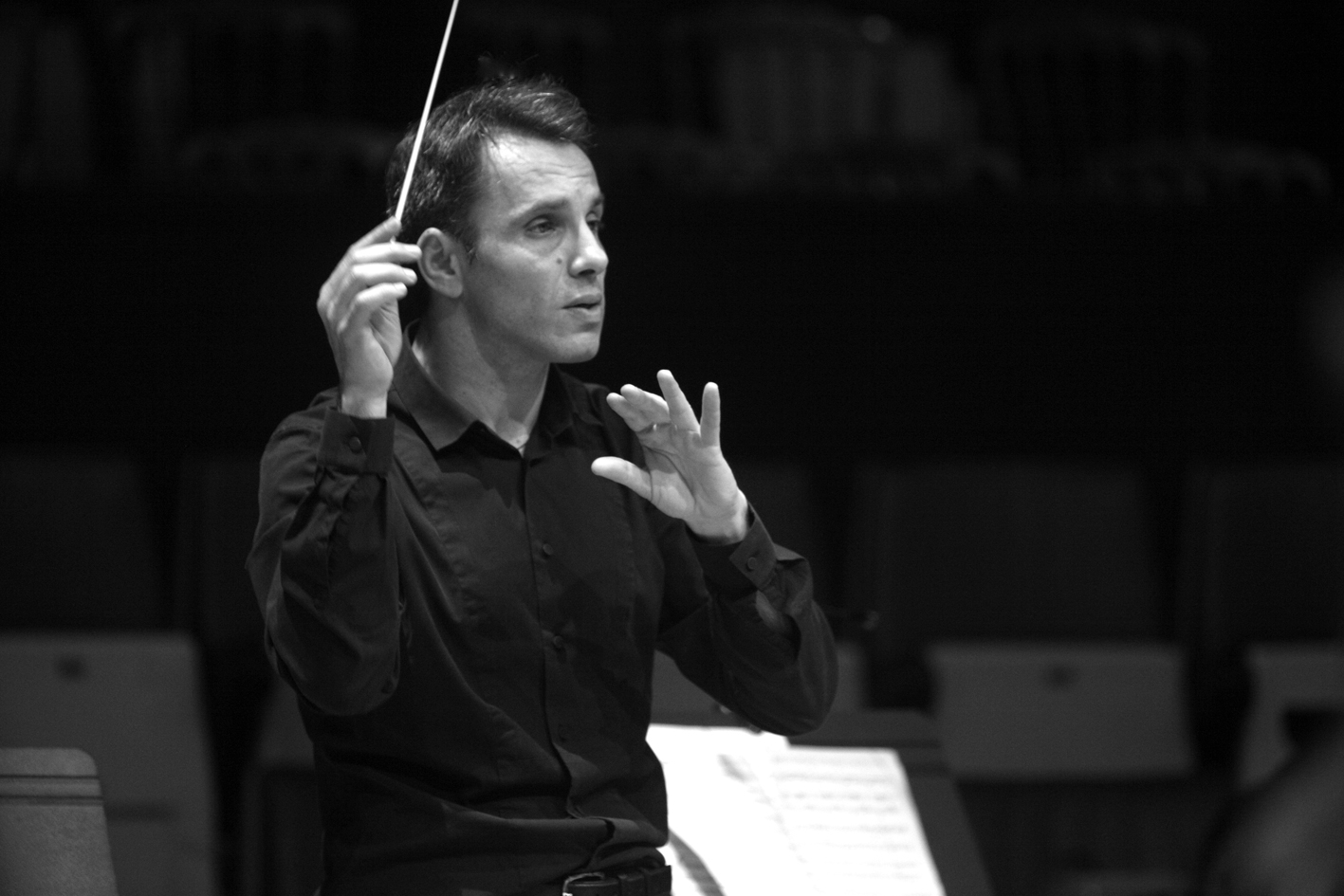
Fayçal Karoui conducting the Orchestre Lamoureux

Fayçal Karoui (born 1971) is a conductor of Tunisian descent.

He won a prize at the 1991 Besançon International Young Conductors Competition and first prize in conducting at the Conservatoire National Supérieur de Paris in 1997. The Aïda scholarship that year gave him the chance to work under Michel Plasson and the Orchestre National du Capitole de Toulouse, and the following June he was appointed Plasson's assistant.

The music director of the Orchestra Philharmonique de Pau from 1997, he conducted the Orchestre de Paris, the Orchestra de l'Opéra National de Paris, the Orchestra National du Capitole de Toulouse, the Orchestra National de Lille and the Orchestra National de Monte-Carlo, as well as the Aix-en-Provence Chamber Orchestra, the Young French Artists' Orchestra, the Académie de Saint-Louis en l'Ile Orchestra of Paris, the Orchestre de Picardie and the Orchestre National de Montpellier. He was the New York City Ballet's music director from December 2006 to spring 2012. the fifth since its inception in 1948. Since January 2011, he is the music director of the Orchestre Lamoureux.

== Discography ==
- l'Orchestre de Pau Pays du Béarn with Etsuko Hirose (piano)
  - Robert Schumann: Concerto pour piano et orchestre
  - Franz Liszt: Concerto pour piano et orchestre n°2
    - Mirare (ref.MIR135)
- l'Orchestre de Pau Pays du Béarn with Isabelle Georges (voice) and l'ensemble Sirba Octet
  - Yiddish Rhapsody
    - Ambroisie (ref.AM191), 2009
- l'Orchestre de Pau Pays du Béarn with Smaïn
  - Sergei Prokofiev: Pierre et le Loup
    - Intrada (ref.INTRA011), 2004
- l'Orchestre des Jeunes d'Ile-de-France with Maciej Pikulski (piano)
  - Sergei Rachmaninoff: Concerto for piano and orchestre n°2
  - with piano solo pieces of Franz Liszt and Frédéric Chopin
    - Zig Zag Territoires
