= Amina Memon =

Social and cognitive psychologist

- Born: June 1961 (age 65); London, United Kingdom

Academic background
- Education: Birkbeck, University of London (LLM) University of Nottingham (PhD) University of East London (BSc)

Academic work
- Discipline: Psychology
- Sub-discipline: Cognitive psychology, Forensic psychology, Cognitive neuropsychology, Eyewitness testimony, Memory conformity
- Institutions: Royal Holloway, University of London University of Aberdeen University of Southampton University of Texas Dallas
- Notable works: Cognitive interview techniques

Amina Memon (born 1961) is a British social and cognitive psychologist, academic, and author. She is a professor of psychology at Royal Holloway, University of London. Her work focuses on understanding the impact of cognition, emotion and social contexts on memory and decision making in legal and forensic settings to help ensure that vulnerable eyewitnesses, including children, young adults, seniors, and people with autism spectrum disorder, are able to recall reliable information and receive appropriate treatment in court.

She is credited for the development of Scottish Executive 2003 guidance on interviewing child witnesses and the 2005 code of practice for supporting child witnesses in court.

== Early life and education ==
Memon was born in June 1961. Her parents had emigrated to London, United Kingdom in the 1950s, and she grew up in East End of London watching them struggle to make a living. She developed an interest in understanding the psychological explanations for human behaviour while studying advanced psychology in school; her teacher, Richard Gross, provided her with individual tutoring on the science behind psychology. She wasn't "allowed to leave home" and as a "last-minute" decision to avoid an arranged marriage, she enrolled in University of East London (formerly known as North East London Polytechnic) in 1979 to study psychology. Her tutors at the psychology department realized that Memon "came from a vulnerable background," and ensured that she didn't drop out to be "married off." She received mentorship and guidance from John Radford who was the first head of psychology at West Ham College of Technology (the predecessor institution of University of East London), and later appointed as the dean of science. Her personal tutor, Ernie Govier, instilled in her the importance of establishing a "good grounding in all areas of psychology." Her lecturers Ray Bull and Brian Clifford inspired her to focus on cognitive and social psychology, in particular the topic of personal identification where "one has to understand the social context in which behaviour occurs." For example, the ability of an eyewitness to effectively recognize a face is influenced by numerous factors, including but not limited to conditions at the time of encoding, witness demographics, events preceding and succeeding the witnessing experience, whether the decision is made in the presence of others, and whether the witness is being threatened or intimidated.

In 1982, Memon joined the University of Nottingham to pursue her doctoral studies in psychology. She worked with Vicki Bruce to "isolate the individual components used in questioning witnesses" in an attempt to "understand which several techniques elicited the most detailed information from eyewitnesses."

While working as a lecturer in social psychology at University of Southampton, England, she visited the School of Human Development, University of Texas Dallas, where she completed her first book Psychology and Law: Truthfulness, Accuracy and Credibility (1998). The second edition of her book, published in 2003, was updated with new research; Dennis Howitt of the Loughborough University, UK called it an "excellent appraisal of the psychology of evidence" for providing "thorough, substantial and up-to-date accounts of modern developments."

From 1999 to 2010, Memon was a professor at University of Aberdeen, Scotland. She ran The Eyewitness Laboratory, equipped with relevant literature, test materials for experimental manipulations, including a collection of video simulations of criminal events and mugshot photos, software for constructing E-FITs and morphing, and a diverse participant pool with access to non-student samples.

Since 2009, she has been a professor at Royal Holloway, University of London, where she also chairs the department of psychology, directs the interdisciplinary Research Centre for the Study of Emotion and Law, and is a member of the Social and Affective Processes (SAP) research group that employs a variety of behavioural, developmental, and neuroscientific techniques to study typical and atypical populations.

In 2012, Memon received an LLM degree in human rights from Birkbeck, University of London with her dissertation focusing on restorative justice. She is a fellow of the British Psychological Society, Association for Psychological Science and Royal Society of Arts.

== Research ==
Memon was one of the first researchers in the UK to study the psychological aspects of the cognitive interview techniques for witnesses based on theoretical memory retrieval principles. Her work has had “important implications” for the ways in which children, young adults, people with autism, and seniors are supported during witness interviews, and how police officers, judges and other judiciary personnel undertake and process these interviews.

Through several instances of trial and error during her earliest doctoral work, Memon learned that separating the effects of individual cognitive interview components and the corresponding techniques that work was a challenging process. She conducted multiple studies and detailed analyses of the interviewers and the interviewees to establish the importance of interview skill and structure while communicating with witnesses. Her subsequent work focused on examining the role of witness characteristics, such as the cognitive competence, in obtaining quality information during interviews. This theory-oriented question helped guide her understanding of the boundary conditions and variables that impact witness memory performance; this information later became central to her training and dissemination activities. “Conducting an eye witness simulation is no mean feat,” Memon said, “Each study is painstakingly time consuming, and achieving a high degree of precision and control is not always possible. However, as an applied researcher, one had to weigh the pros and cons of doing research in a laboratory with collecting data in the field.” She added that despite choosing a difficult area of study, she was not put off by working in a laboratory on witness interview procedures grounded in simulate real-world simulations. She actively translated her findings into “accessible and useful” information for non-academic audiences. “Students can learn so much from these information giving and sharing activities, and some of my most important research questions come from interactions with the users of my research,” Memon wrote in a 2015 journal article for Applied Cognitive Psychology entitled “My Journey from Research to Impact: Long Road and Much Traffic”.

In the late 1990s, Memon authored guidance documents for the Scottish Executive on interviewing child witnesses, in particular traumatized children undergoing therapy “whose evidence needed to be collected without contamination from this therapy.” She is also responsible for the development of 2005 code of practice for supporting child witnesses in court. Between 2003 and 2007, she trained Scotland family court judges on effectively interviewing child witnesses. Her work "laid the foundation for key police investigative interviewing protocols which are used today and outlined in Achieving Best Evidence in Criminal Proceedings: Guidance on Interviewing Victims and Witnesses, published by the Ministry of Justice (2011)." Her evaluation of the cognitive interview, a research-based tool for gathering detailed eyewitness reports, was the first of its kind in the UK, and is now used to train every police force in England and Wales.

Between 2003 and 2005, while working at Aberdeen University, Memon codirected a research project that received more than £55,000 from Leverhulme Trust for “a new type of laboratory-based memory study” to “identify what it is about a person (e.g. personality, confidence) that makes them respond first in a discussion” about a mutually experienced event. A prior research, also conducted at Aberdeen and funded by the Economic and Social Research Council, had found that “one person's memory becomes similar to another person's memory following their discussion of a mutually experienced event.” Speaking about the Leverhulme grant, Memon said: “When people discuss an event, what one person says can readily be incorporated into another person's memory report. This new grant, from The Leverhulme Trust, will allow us to explore this further and develop a model of eyewitness conformity to identify how this process of influence occurs and who is most susceptible to this form of influence.”

After her appointment at RHUL, Memon received £97,184 from the European Framework Programme "New and Emerging Science and Technology" (2007–10) to conduct a "major meta-analysis and study-space analysis covering 25 years of cognitive interview research.” Subsequent funding of £96, 449 from the Leverhulme Trust (2010–12) enabled her research group to uncover why cognitive interview supports memory retrieval, particularly in older adults, and funding of £83,917 from the ESRC (2012–13) contributed to the development of cognitive interview procedures for people with autism.

In recent years, Memon's work has focused on applying her research findings to influence policy and practice in psychology and law. In her role as a trustee for Centre for the Study of Emotion and the Law, she looks at dissemination tactics for applying “high-quality” research to benefit “people who have been oppressed and victimized and are seeking protection in law.” She received funding from Unbound Philanthropy in 2019–20 to “disseminate research on psychological issues pertinent in children and adults seeking international protection.”

In 2020, Memon collaborated with researchers from the University of Münster and Mainz, Germany to study the prevailing conspiracy theories related Corona virus pandemic in post-Brexit Britain. With a sample size of 498 UK citizens, the team examined the "associations between traits and conspiracy beliefs and prejudice against social groups perceived as powerful (e.g. Jews, Chinese people)." Preliminary findings from testing the pre-registered hypotheses revealed that "people on political extremes showed higher conspiracy theory agreement than [those] in the middle."

Memon has published over 150 peer-reviewed articles.

== Other engagements ==
Memon is part of the appointing panel of the Netherlands Register of Court Experts. She has served as an expert witness in civil and criminal cases, providing expertise on “child witnesses, memory, eyewitness identification and historic abuse in the UK and USA.”

She's a member of the research and ethics committee at Freedom from Torture, where she develops “a culturally relevant practice, the legal context [and] an appreciation of the potential impact of multiple traumatic experiences” on asylum seeking and refugee children, adults and families. As a member of the project advisory board for Asylum Aid, Memon addresses concerns related to the perceived credibility of information gathered during interviews with asylum seekers. She believes that Home Office personnel can benefit from training in this area. She is the founder of the Leadership Academy for Asian Women.

== Awards ==
In May 2016, Memom was recognized at the 16th Asian Women of Achievement Awards for being one of the “high-potential and high-achieving” asian women in the UK. In 2017, she was awarded the Economic & Social Research Council (ESRC) prize for “outstanding impact in public policy” and received £10,000.

== Personal life ==
Memon was married to Frank Barker, an oil-industry geologist who died in 2011. To honour the memory of her late husband, she set up the Frank Barker Prizes, awarded annually to first, second, and third year Royal Holloway students who have demonstrated the biggest improvement from their previous year of study. In addition, MPX, a Guildford, Surrey-based oil company where Barker worked, set up the Frank Barker Award that annually recognizes the best third year student continuing on the Master of Science programme.

== Selected publications ==
=== Books ===
- Memon, Amina; Vrij, Aldert; Bull, Ray (2003). Psychology & law: truthfulness, accuracy and credibility. Chichester: Wiley. ISBN 978-0-470-85060-2.
- Memon, Amina; Bull, Ray, eds. (1999). Handbook of the psychology of interviewing. Chichester Weinheim: Wiley. ISBN 978-0-471-97443-7.

=== Book chapters ===
- Memon, Amina; Gawrylowicz, Julie (2018-07-16), Hargie, Owen (ed.), "The Cognitive Interview", The Handbook of Communication Skills (4 ed.), Routledge, pp. 511–530, doi:10.4324/9781315436135-18, ISBN 978-1-315-43613-5, retrieved 2025-09-22
- Memon, Amina; Henderson, Sarah E. (2002-03-14), "Chapter 11. What Can Psychologists Contribute to the Examination of Memory and Past Mental States?", Retrospective Assessment of Mental States in Litigation, Library, American Psychiatric Association Publishing, pp. 307–333, doi:10.1176/appi.books.9781615376995.lg11, ISBN 978-1-58562-001-2, retrieved 2025-09-22
- Bartlett, James C.; Memon, Amina (2014-05-12), "Eyewitness Memory in Young and Older Adults", Handbook Of Eyewitness Psychology 2 Volume Set (1 ed.), New York: Routledge, pp. 309–338, doi:10.4324/9781315805535-36, ISBN 978-1-315-80553-5, retrieved 2025-09-22

=== Journal articles ===
- Memon, Amina; Given-Wilson, Zoe; Ozkul, Derya; Richmond, Karen McGregor; Muraszkiewicz, Julia; Weldon, Ella; Katona, Cornelius (2024–04). "Artificial Intelligence (AI) in the asylum system". Medicine, Science and the Law. 64 (2): 87–90. doi:10.1177/00258024241227721. ISSN 0025-8024.
- Morrison, Louisa; Given‐Wilson, Zoe; Memon, Amina (2024–03). "The impact of emotionally evocative information on interpreting accuracy in a mock asylum interview". Applied Cognitive Psychology. 38 (2). doi:10.1002/acp.4185. ISSN 0888-4080.
- Vredeveldt, Annelies; Given-Wilson, Zoe; Memon, Amina (2023-05-09). "Culture, trauma, and memory in investigative interviews". Psychology, Crime & Law: 1–21. doi:10.1080/1068316X.2023.2209262. ISSN 1068-316X.
- Ko, Hayley; Memon, Amina (2023-04-21). "Secondary traumatization in criminal justice professions: a literature review". Psychology, Crime & Law. 29 (4): 361–385. doi:10.1080/1068316X.2021.2018444. ISSN 1068-316X.
