= Amna Riaz =

Pakistani YouTuber

- Born: 17 August 1990 (age 35); Lahore, Pakistan
- Occupation: Food expert

YouTube information
- Channel: Kitchen with Amna
- Years active: 2016-present
- Genre: Cooking
- Subscribers: 4.4 million
- Views: 671 million
- Last updated: 26 October 2024

Amna Riaz (Urdu: آمنہ ریاض; born 17 August 1990) is a Pakistani YouTuber and food expert who is known for her channel Kitchen with Amna. She is the first Pakistani woman to receive a Gold Play Button.

Riaz started her channel in 2016 and subsequently uploaded her first video as a test. Riaz teaches beginners complex Pakistani dishes in short and simple videos.

== Personal life ==
Riaz was born in Lahore, Pakistan.

Amna Riaz has four siblings, two brothers and two sisters. She married Umair Zafar in 2020. She had a daughter in 2021 named Ayat Umair. She had a son named Abdullah Umair in 2022.
