= Amna bint Abdulaziz Al Thani =

Qatari businesswoman

Sheikha Amna
- Sheikha of Qatar
Names
- Amna bint Abdulaziz bin Jassim Al Thani
- House: Thani
- Occupation: Chief of Museum and Heritage Development at Qatar Museums

Styles of Sheikha Amna bint Abdulaziz bin Jassim Al Thani
- Reference style: Her Excellency
- Spoken style: Your Excellency
- Alternative style: Sheikha

Sheikha Amna bint Abdulaziz bin Jassim Al Thani (Arabic: الشيخة آمنة بنت عبد العزيز بن جاسم آل ثاني) is a Qatari businesswoman who is chief of Museum and Heritage Development at Qatar Museums and the former Director of the National Museum of Qatar.

== Education ==
Sheikha Amna graduated with a BSc in Business Administration and English from Carnegie Mellon University. She also earned an MSc in sociology from the London School of Economics.

== Career ==
Prior to her work at the National Museum of Qatar, Amna worked in the Investment Banking division of Goldman Sachs at Qatar Financial Centre. She was also Director of Finance and Strategy for the office of H.E. Sheikha Al Mayassa bint Hamad bin Khalifa Al Thani, who is Chair of Qatar Museums.

In 2013 she was appointed as Director of the then under-construction National Museum of Qatar. She previously coordinated the Steering Committee for the future museum. The National Museum of Qatar opened in 2019, with Amna as its director. The museum was developed in collaboration with Qatari people over the preceding decade prior to its opening. Through consultation, themes were developed which were used in the final layout of the museum. However Sheikha Amna said it "is not a showcase for a collection. It is a journey—and like any true journey, it does not merely take people from one place to another." She has also described how "the story of the people of Qatar" is at the centre of the museum's interpretation. The new museum also asked Qatari people for contemporary contributions to add to the museum's collection. In 2020 she collaborated with collectors and historians to showcase Qatar's automobile history in an exhibition at the museum.

She is also a member of the Middle East Board of the World Class Learning Group (WCL Group) and on the Industrial Advisory Committee to the Centre of the Advanced Materials (CAM) at Qatar University. In 2018 she joined the board of the Journal of Interpretation Research.

In 2022, Amna was named Deputy CEO of Museums, Collections, and Heritage Protection at Qatar Museums, while also being involved in the opening of the 3-2-1 Qatar Olympic and Sports Museum. In February 2024, Sheikh Abdulaziz H. Al Thani replaced Amna as director of the NmoQ and appointed her as Chief of Museum and Heritage Development at Qatar Museums.

She is also the chair of the International Council of Museums (iCOM) Qatar.
