= Amina Hanum Syrtlanoff =

Russian public figure (1884-?)

- Амина Сыртланова
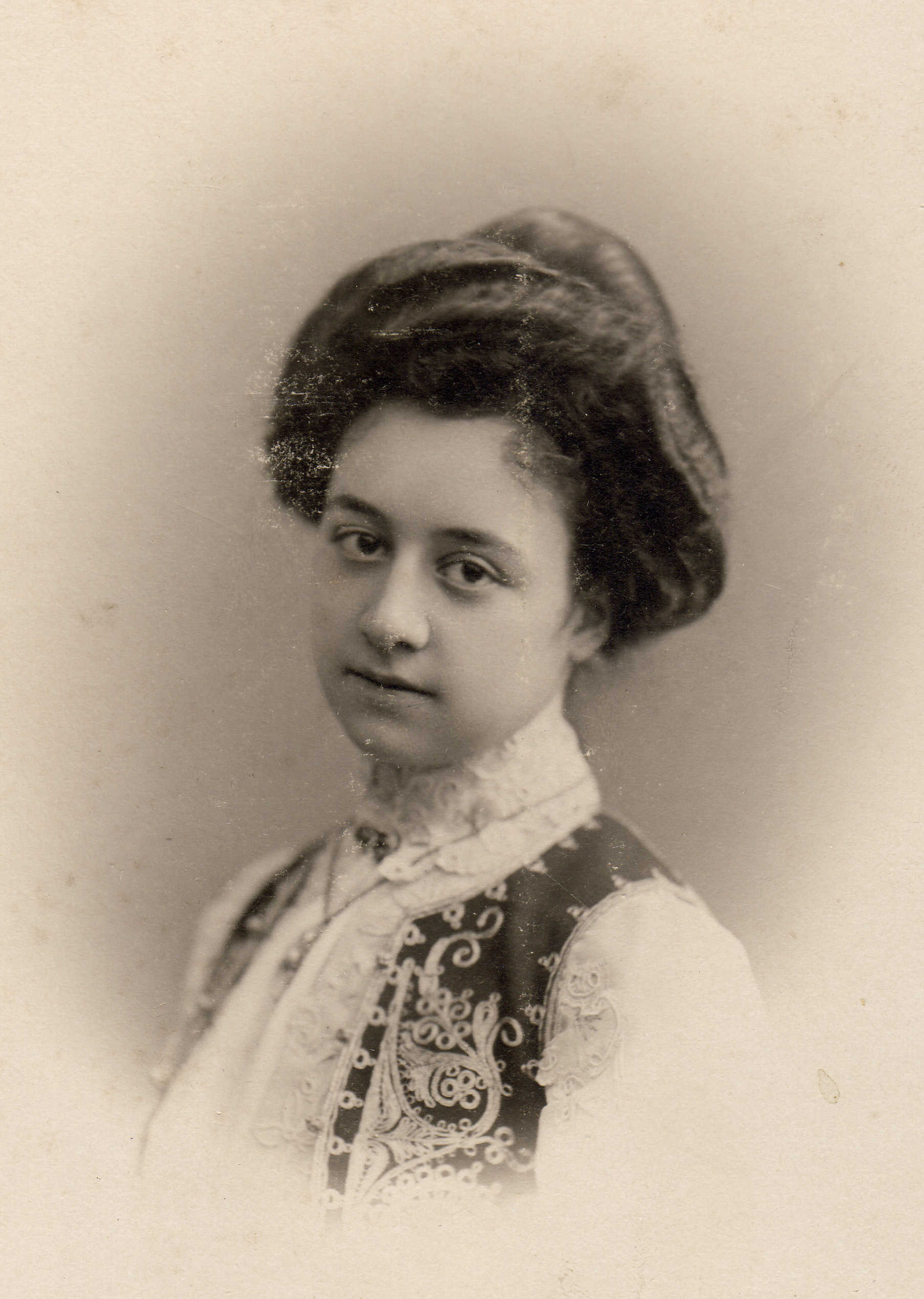
- End of 1890s or beginning of 1900s.
- Born: Амина Махмудовна Шейхалиева; 1884; Ufa Governorate, Russian Empire
- Died: after 1939; France

Amina Hanum Syrtlanoff or Syrtlanova (in Russian: Амина Махмудовна Сыртланова, maiden name in Russian: Шейх-Али, in French: Cheik Ali, in English: Sheikh-Ali; 1884, city of Ufa, Russian Empire — after 1939, France) — public figure, sister of mercy, theosophist, mason.

== Biography ==
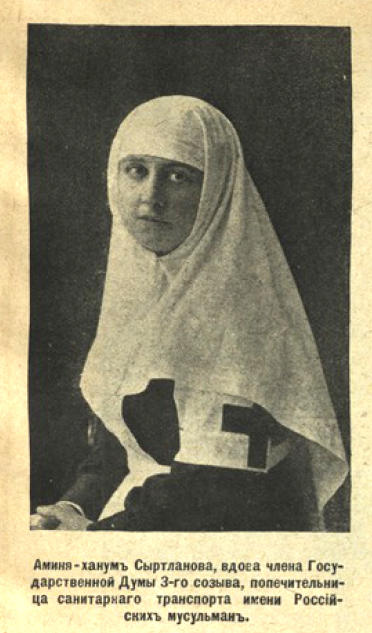
Amina Khanum Syrtlanoff, widow of a member of the State Duma of the third convocation, Matron of Russian Muslims ambulance train

Born in 1884 in the family of Major General Mahmoud Magomedovich Shуikhaliyev (Sheikhali or Sheikh-Ali) and landowner Magiparvaz Sheikhaliyeva(maiden name Alkina). She was the niece of honorary Devlet Mirza Shikhaliyev (Sheikh-Ali), colonel, chief bailiff of Muslim peoples of Stavropol province, as well as prominent public figures Ibniamin Alkin and Seid Giray Alkin.

She married the 3rd Russian State Duma deputy Galiaskar Syrtlanov. After his murder on 20 August 1912, she took an active part in public life. She was chairman of the "Petrograd Muslim Educational Society" and had a "large influence among the enlightened Moslems of Petersburg, as well as Ufa".

After the beginning of the First World War, she became a member of the Central Committee of the Russian Muslim organizations, united Muslim charities for the support of Russian troops. In the summer of 1916 she served as Matron of the Russian Muslims ambulance train sent to the War forefront.

After the Russian Revolution, Syrtlanoff emigrated to Finland. While there, she took part in the establishment of local Tatar congregation. During this time she was in contact with Finnish theosophists and advertised her services as a music teacher in the Finnish press. Syrtlanoff made presentations on Islam to different associations; she wanted to "clear the reputation of Prophet Muhammad to suspicious westerners". Syrtlanoff was also known as ”Emine Sartlan” in Finland.

Next, she traveled to France and settled in Paris. In 1926-1939, she made reports in French and Russian Theosophical Societies. From 1933-1935, deputy board member, since 1935 a board member of the Union of Russian nurses named after Vrevskaya in France. In 1935 she made reports in the society "Soul of Russia". From 1921 to 1929 she was a member of the International Masonic Order "Human Rights» (Le Droit Humain), engaged in the protection of civil rights. In 1929 she became head of the Russian-speaking Lodge "Aurora", a constituent institution of this Order, and remained a member of the Lodge until 1939. She equated Theosophy to Freemasonry. After the beginning of the German occupation of France and closing all Masonic Lodges on its territory, her fate is unknown.

== Family ==
Husband — Ali Oscar (Galiaskar) Shahaydarovich Syrtlanov (1875–1912), also referred as Aliasgar Sirtlanov in the English translation of the book of Zeki Velidi Togan, member of the 3d State Duma of Russian Empire, a lawyer at the trial of Vice Admiral Rozhestvensky, Admiral Nebogatov and Lieutenant General Stessel, accused in the defeat of the Army and Navy in the Russian-Japanese War of 1904–1905.

== Interesting Facts ==
In January 1926 the Lodge "Aurora", referring to the "rights of people", was created in Paris. This Lodge was not recognized by other Masonic Orders. The Lodge included both men and women and was headed by Nagrodskaya (1926–1928), Syrtlanova (1929), Brill (1930), Nagrodsky (1931).
