= Amina Rachid =

Moroccan actress (1936–2019)

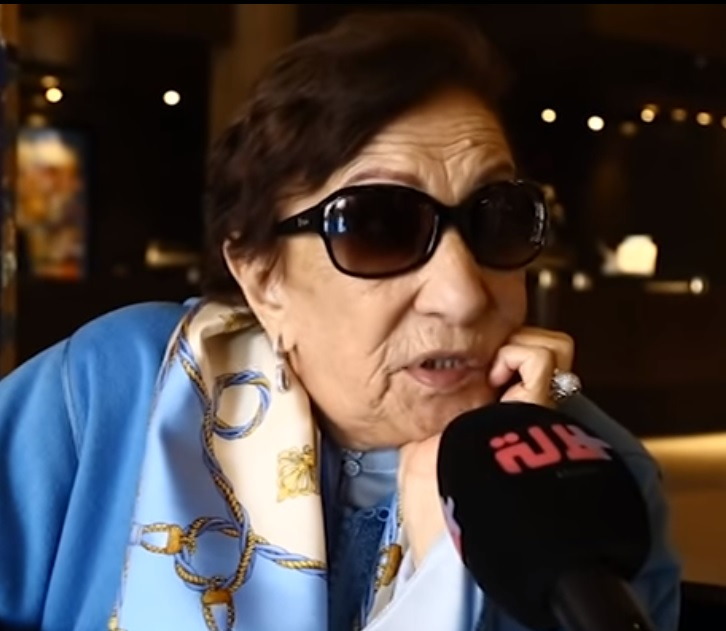
- Born: Jamila Ben Omar; 11 April 1936; Marrakesh, Morocco
- Died: August 2019 (aged 83); Tétouan, Morocco
- Occupation: Actress
- Years active: 1936–2019
- Spouse: Abdellah Chakroun

Amina Rachid (born Jamila Ben Omar; 11 April 1936 – August 2019) was a Moroccan actress. She presented more than 60 major theatrical works to the theater and participated in many television works from 1962 until the end of her life. She worked in Moroccan radio as an actress for many years and presented about 3,500 plays, evening shows, and radio series. She excelled in the field of cinema and participated in several famous films.

== Career ==
Rachid showed a passion for theater and acting from her early childhood, eventually starring in school plays. In the early 1960s, the Moroccan national radio announced its need for new recruits. Rachid accepted the offer and made her debut in radio theater, alongside her lifelong colleague, Habiba El Madkouri, who died in 2011. In 1971, Rachid trained as an actress abroad before returning to Morocco to work at the Société nationale de radiodiffusion et de télévision (SNRT), where she met her future husband and life partner, Abdellah Chakroun.

She is best known for her roles in several feature films, the most famous being In search of my wife's husband, Lalla Houby, Destin de femme, Elle est diabétique, hypertendue et elle refuse de crever, and Aida.

== Death ==
Rachid died at the age of 83 in August 2019, after a long illness.
