= Amina Al Jassim =

Saudi fashion designer

Amina Al Jassim or Amina Al-Jassim, is a Saudi Arabian fashion designer of haute couture and jellabiyas.
