= Amina Taher =

Emirati business executive

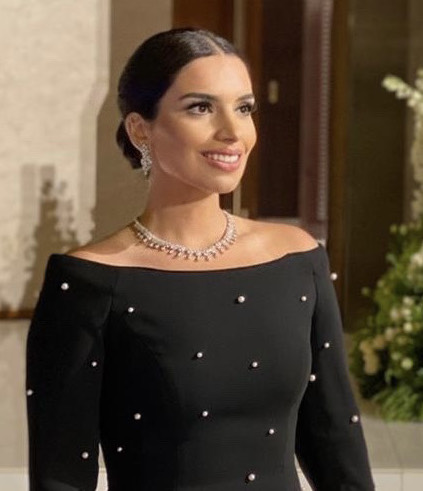
- Taher at an event in Dubai, January 2021
- Born: Dubai, United Arab Emirates
- Education: London Business School; Harvard Kennedy School
- Occupation: Businesswoman

Amina Taher (Arabic: أمينة طاهر) is an Emirati airline marketing executive, businesswoman, and advocate for the empowerment of women. Taher joined Etihad Airways in January 2013, and is currently VP, brand, marketing and sponsorships for the airline.

== Education ==
Taher gained an MBA degree from London Business School and an MPA degree from Harvard University's Kennedy School, where she was an Emirates Leader Initiative Fellowship/ Scholarship recipient.

== Career ==
Taher is the only woman on the board of DXB Entertainments PJSC, which owns several theme parks and hotels in UAE, including Legoland Dubai, in addition to sitting on the boards of the Middle East Public Relations Association and the Marketing Society. Previously, she served on the UAE Tennis Federation board, where she promoted the development of tennis at a grassroots level to Emirati youth.

Taher was named as one of the top 50 Forbes Power Businesswomen in The Middle East in 2020 and was also featured in Forbes' 50 impactful Marketing and Communications Professionals in the Middle East. In December 2020, she was the feature of a cover story in Elle Arabia.

Taher's other work has included both writing as a columnist from 2007 to 2012 and hosting a podcast series produced by The National. From 2010 to 2014 she was head of communications and social development at Mubadala Investments. During her tenure, she founded and led Weyana, the sovereign wealth fund's youth program focusing on education, culture, and well-being.

In 2011, Taher co-founded Slices, a startup that has served over 1,000,000 locally sourced meals to Emirati schoolchildren.

== Personal life ==
Taher was born and raised in Dubai and is the eldest of five sisters. She has one daughter.
