= Ameena case =

1991 human trafficking case

The Ameena case was the 1991 selling of a 10-year young girl, Ameena from Hyderabad, India, to a man from Saudi Arabia. The child bride was rescued on 10 August 1991 by the air hostess Amrita Ahluwalia when Ameena was being taken to Saudi Arabia. Later it was found Badruddin and his wife Sabira Begum had sold their 10-year-old daughter Ameena into marriage for a reported $240 to a 60-year-old Saudi Arabian man. The case unearthed bride shopping in Hyderabad by men from the Middle East and raised a lot of attention at that time.

== In popular culture ==
In 1993, CBS 60 Minutes featured a segment on Ameena's life story.

The movie Yahan Ameena Bikti Hai starring Rekha Rana as Ameena was released in 2016 which was based on her real life.

== Bibliography ==
- Abraham, Taisha (2002). "3. The Ameena Case (by Rajeshwari Sundar Ranjan)". Women and the Politics of Violence. Har-Anand Publications. pp. 45–75. ISBN 978-81-241-0847-5.
- Collective, The Feminist Review (2005). "2. To Whom Does Ameena Belong?". Debating Discourses, Practising Feminisms: Feminist Review. Routledge. pp. 25–56. ISBN 978-1-134-71887-0.
