= Amina Priscille Longoh =

Chadian politician

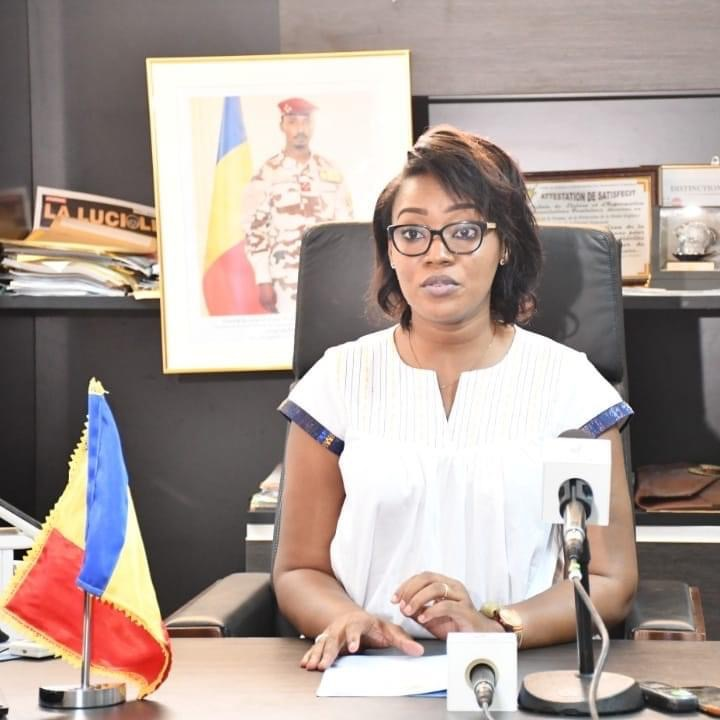

Minister of State, Minister of Women, Protection of Early Childhood and National Solidarity
- Incumbent
- Assumed office July 14, 2020
- President: Idriss Déby; Mahamat Déby

Ambassador of Chad to France
- Incumbent
- Assumed office January, 2026

Ambassador of Chad to Vatican

Personal details
- Born: 1991 (age 34–35) Sarh, Chad
- Party: Patriotic Salvation Movement

Amina Priscille Longoh (born 1991) is a Chadian humanitarian organizer, politician and diplomat who has served as the Ambassador of Chad to France since January 2026, and as Ambassador to the Vatican since May of the same year. She has served as in the government of Chad as minister of women and the protection of early childhood since July 2020.

== Early life and education ==
Amina Priscille Longoh was born in 1991 in Sarh, located in the Moyen-Chari region of southern Chad. She pursued higher education in business administration, obtaining a bachelor's degree from the Wintech Professional Institute in Ghana and a master's degree in business administration from Sup’Management.

== Career ==
Longoh began her professional career in the oil sector, working for the multinational company Glencore from 2013 to 2018. She later left the industry to focus on humanitarian work and social impact initiatives.

== Political career ==
In 2016, she founded Tchad Helping Hands, a charitable organization dedicated to supporting vulnerable populations, particularly women and girls. The initiative focuses on education, welfare, and emergency assistance for disadvantaged communities in Chad. She has also been actively involved in advocacy for gender equality and the protection of children, working with both local and international partners.

In 2019, Longoh was appointed by President Idriss Déby as Director of the National Women's House in Chad. She also served as Education Commissioner for the Panafrican Youth Union.

In July 2020, she was appointed by Déby as Minister of Women and the Protection of Early Childhood at the age of 29, making her one of the youngest members of the Chadian government. She was one of nine women in the 35-member cabinet. She retained her position through multiple government reshuffles under transitional president Mahamat Déby, who took over after his father's death.

The minister was the subject of a controversy in November 2020 when a photo circulated online of her holding a Quran, which was a gift from students at a Quranic school. Some Muslims believe that non-Muslims should not directly touch the holy book. She apologized, removing the photo from her social media profile and asking for forgiveness from the Muslim community.

In September 2023, she was raised to the rank of Minister of State, becoming the first woman in Chad to attain that level.

Longoh has advocated against the social and economic marginalization of women, and in favor of women's role in pan-African unity and identity. She has also been involved in national and international efforts addressing gender-based violence and social inclusion.

== Diplomatic career ==
In 2026, Longoh was appointed as the Ambassador of Chad to France. This is a transition from her ministerial role into diplomatic service, representing Chad in France. On May 21, 2026, she was appointed ambassador to the Vatican.
