= Amena Khan =

British model and fashion designer (born 1983)

- Born: 17 November 1983 (age 42); Leicester, England
- Occupations: Fashion designer; social media influencer
- Spouse: Osaama Khamkar (m. 2006)
- Children: 2
- Website: pearl-daisy.com

Amena Khan is a British fashion designer, and internet celebrity. She is best known for founding the fashion company Pearl Daisy, designing head scarfs, and becoming the first hijab model in a L'Oreal hair-care campaign.

== Personal life ==
Amena Khan was born in Leicester, England in 1983. She was raised in a Hyderabadi Muslim family from India but did not start wearing hijab until she was in her early twenties. She felt like she never saw people of her background portrayed in a positive light on television and that's what inspired her to become a model. Khan began wearing the hijab at 22 and decided to take it off at 36. She stated both decisions were made of her own free will with no external pressures and both decisions made her feel empowered.

In 2006, Khan married Osaama Khamkar. The couple has two children— a son born May 2009 and a daughter born March 2011.

== Career ==
=== Pearl Daisy ===
In 2009, Khan began hand-sewing and creating hijabs to sell to her YouTube fan base. This turned into her company which she entitled Pearl Daisy. Later on, she invented the "Hoojab" as part of the Pearl Daisy brand and has since become a staple for the company. The Hoojab is a hijab headscarf with a built in hood. The hood is supposed to create more styling options and make it easier for wearers to get the proportions right because when the hood is placed on the head, there is already a long side and short side built in.

Pearl Daisy closed down on 6 September 2021 at midnight after 12 years of operation and plans to stay closed until further notice. They decided it was time to let go of the business after struggling through the COVID-19 pandemic for over a year. However, they did leave the possibility open for restarting the business in the future.

=== Ardere Cosmetics and Lashionery ===
In 2015, Khan co-founded Ardere Cosmetics a cruelty-free makeup line meant for darker skinned woman. A 2018 article referred to the cosmetics company as a "luxury" brand that had "affordable" prices and was emerging as a mainstream competitor. She also has her own false lash line called Lashionery and in 2018, she launched a clothing line for her fashion boutique Pearl Daisy.

=== L'Oréal partnership ===
In 2018, Khan became the first woman wearing a hijab to be part of a mainstream advert for hair care. However, this accomplishment was short lived— she resigned following the criticism of her now deleted tweets criticising Israel's military action in Gaza in 2014, in which she stated that the Israeli government were "child killers." She later said:

I deeply regret the content of the tweets I made in 2014, and sincerely apologize for the upset and hurt that they have caused. Championing diversity is one of my passions, I don’t discriminate against anyone. I have chosen to delete them as they do not represent the message of harmony that I stand for.

Editorial writers Kate Wilkinson Cross and Rajnaara C Akhtar wrote an article comparing Khan's treatment during the L'Oréal controversy and Gal Gadot's treatment who made similar comments from the other side of the argument about the same exact event Khan commented on. After Israel took military action in Gaza in 2014, Gal Gadot tweeted her support of the Israeli military and Amena Khan tweeted her disapproval of the event. Yet the reactions they received were very different. The editorials writers wrote:

It seems clear that neither Gadot nor Khan can be accused of being extreme, and both are entitled to their views. But only one has felt the need to resign as a result.

Other political outlets have also spoken up about the complexity of this issue. The Intercept interviewed a political fashion blogger and activist named Hoda Katebi about Khan stepping down from the L'Oréal partnership and she said: "Brands want the face, but they don’t want the complex politics or the identity or the voice behind it... Once a Muslim woman asserts her agency, they’ll strip that away.” Backing up her comments, writer of the same Intercept article, Rashmee Kumar, explained that brands are trying to tap into a billion dollar Muslim consumer market by "positioning themselves as socially conscious havens for Muslims" except they are "operating on a profit motive rather than a moral imperative."

However, no matter how complex the issue may be, some journalists of opposing views, such as Toi Staff, claim that calling Israel an "illegal, sinister" state and that "Insha’Allah (God willing), defeat also awaits the former; it’s only a matter of time,” as Amena Khan has, will always be antisemitic and should never be excused.

=== Magazine covers and editorials ===
In 2017, Khan was featured by Elle Magazine as one of four Muslim beauty influencers, in which she spoke about fighting against stereotypes as well as her experience wearing a headscarf. She said "Growing up without a headscarf I can see the stark difference between how I was treated then to how I'm treated now."

In 2018, She was featured in Vogue Magazine following the announcement of her L'Oréal hair campaign. The magazine hailed her as a "perfect" hair ambassador and pointed out that this is a first for headscarf wearing women. Writer of the article, Lisa Niven-Phillips, states why the work Khan is doing for L'Oréal is so important:

A large part of what makes this campaign so important and so overdue is the conversations it will provoke and the young people who will see it and at last find people that they can relate to and identify with on their smartphone screens and in their magazines.

=== Bumble partnership ===
In 2019, Khan landed a partnership with Bumble and became a Bumble Bizz Ambassador. The business side of the app was attempting to expand by creating brand ambassadors to promote the company. Khan became one of those ambassadors and used this opportunity to uplift Muslim and South Asian business women by holding a workshop and networking event that focused on that demographic.

=== Podcast ===
In 2020, Khan started a podcast called Thrive that airs on Spotify and iTunes. She does both solo episodes and episodes with different guests. Her solo episodes focus on sharing information about "everything from beauty to health, to business, parenting, education and spirituality", whereas her guest episodes focus more on stories from the guest that center around personal growth.
