= Amna Guellali =

Amna Guellali (Arabic: آمنة القلالي; born 14 November 1972) is a jurist and Libyan-Tunisian human rights activist.

== Biography ==
She was born on 14 November 1972 in Tripoli, Libya, the only daughter of a Tunisian mother and a Libya father. When she was eight her parents escaped from the dictatorial rule of Muammar Gaddafi. They left Libya and settled in Tunisia. Guellali then continued her studies in Tunis. After high school she entered university and finally obtained a degree in law from the Faculty of Legal, Political and Social Sciences of Tunis. She then prepared a DEA (Master of Advanced Studies) of public international law under the direction of Slim Laghmani.

After she had finished her studies, Guellali was employed by the International Committee of the Red Cross in Maghreb. She then worked for two years in Rome for the International Development Law Organization. She then resumed her studies at the European University Institute in Fiesole and obtained her doctorate in 2008. She prepared her thesis under the direction of Pierre-Marie Dupuy and Slim Laghmani, about The International Law Between Humanization and Criminalization. This thesis was published in 2015 by the Éditions universitaires européens. She then joined T.M.C. Asser Instituut in The Hague, then the International Criminal Court in the same city as an analyst at the prosecutor's office.

When the Tunisian revolution broke out in 2011, she decided to return to her adopted country to participate in its evolution. She opened the Human Rights Watch office in Tunis. In this way she made inquiries on many cases of human rights, for example, the assassination of Chokri Belaid in February 2013 and the environment of agitation of hatred and violence., the continual convictions of blogger Yassine Ayari by military courts in 2014 and 2015, etc. She also has been active in necessary developments such as equality for women in inheritance.

At different times, she has been under pressure for her activities. For example, in August 2013, she was detained for several hours then released, as part of her investigations on cases of terrorism and political assassinations.

== Awards ==
Amna Guellal was among the Tunisian delegation who won the 2015 Nobel Peace Prize.

In 2017, she was awarded the annual prize of the organization POMED (Project on Middle East Democracy).
