= Amina Yusifgizi =

Azerbaijani actress (1936–2025)

- Əminə Yusifqızı
- Born: 24 September 1936; Baku, Azerbaijan SSR, Transcaucasian SFSR, USSR
- Died: October 2025 (aged 89)
- Occupation: Actress
- Awards

Amina Yusifgizi (Azerbaijani: Əminə Yusifqızı, 24 September 1936 – October 2025) was an Azerbaijani theatrical and film actress. The recipient of multiple awards, she was made a People's Artiste of Azerbaijan in 1998.

== Life and career ==
Yusifgizi was born in Baku on 24 September 1936. She graduated from the Azerbaijan State Pedagogical University in 1961.

She was an actress of the Azerbaijan State Theatre of Young Spectators from 1958 to 1964, and from 1964 to 1974, she worked at the Azerbaijan State Academic National Drama Theatre and from 1974 at the "Azerbaijanfilm" studio, including at the "film actor" theater studio within "Azerbaijanfilm".

Yusifgizi was known as a master of artistic recitation.

Yusifgizi died in October 2025, at the age of 89.

== Awards ==
- Honored Artist of the Azerbaijan SSR — 1 December 1982
- People's Artiste of Azerbaijan
- Jafar Jabbarly Award — 2010
- Shohrat Order — 14 September 2016
