= Sanâa Alaoui =

French-Moroccan actress

- Born: April 29, 1987 (age 38); Casablanca, Morocco
- Other names: Sanaa Alaoui
- Education: Lycée Lyautey
- Occupations: Film actress Television actress
- Years active: 2002–present

Sanâa Alaoui, also known as Sanaa Alaoui (Arabic: سناء العلوي), is a French Moroccan actress.

== Life ==
Alaoui aws born on April 29, 1987, in Casablanca. She earned her high school degree at Lycée Lyautey in Casablanca.

As a polyglot, she collaborated with directors from various nationalities, such as Gustavo Loza, Adil El Arbi and Abdelkader Lagtaâ. She plays in five languages: Arabic, French, Spanish, English and German.

In 2021, she led the jury of the Festival AMAL in Spain.

== Private life ==
Alaoui currently resides in Morocco, after several years spent in France.

== Filmography ==
=== Film ===
- 2022: Collapsed Walls by Hakim Belabbes :
- 2018: Operation Red Sea (Opération Mer Rouge) by Dante Lam: Ina
- 2015: Black by Adil El Arbi and Bilall Fallah: Mina
- 2014: Image by Adil El Arbi and Bilall Fallah: Mina
- 2013: Vuelos prohibidos by Rigoberto Lopez: Monica
- 2011: Poupiya by Samia Charkioui (short film)
- 2008: Terminus des anges by Hicham Lasri, Narjiss Nejjar and Mohamed Mouftakir: Samia
- 2008: Ça se soigne ? by Laurent Chouchan: Samia
- 2008: Un novio para Yasmina (Un fiancé pour Yasmina) by Irene Cardona: Yasmina
- 2007: Yasmine et les hommes by Abdelkader Lagtaâ: Yasmine
- 2007: Oud Al ward ou la beauté éparpillée by Lahcen Zinoun: Oud l'Ward
- 2005: Ici et là by Mohamed Ismaïl: Samira
- 2004: Le Pain nu (Al khoubz al hafi) by Rachid Benhadj: Mohamed Choukri's mother
- 2004: Al otro lado (De l'autre côté) by Gustavo Loza: the mother
- 2004: Le Cadeau by Jamal Souissi (short film)
- 2002: Face à face by Abdelkader Lagtaâ: Amal
- 1996: Le Cri de la soie by Yvon Marciano: Aicha

=== Television ===
- 2022: Nisf Kamar of Jihane Bahar : Hanane
- 2020: Le secret enterréof Yassine Fennane : Ferdaous
- 2019: Coeur Karimof Abdelhay Laaraki : Professeur Nezha
- 2016: Le juge est une femme, ep. Mauvais genre: Dalila Bensalem
- 2011: Fischer fischt Frau, TV film by Lars Jessen: Mona
- 2011: Section de recherches: Leïla Rezoug
- 2010: Les Virtuoses, TV series, 1 episode: Nora Belassen
- 2008: Bajo el mismo cielo, TV film by Sílvia Munt
- 2008: Julie Lescaut, television series, 2 episodes: Maud
- 2008: Famille d'accueil, a series by Stéphane Kaminka, 3 ep.: Lila
- 2007: Duval et Moretti, a series by Stéphane Kaminka, 3 ep.: Lila
- 2006: Les Rimaquoi (France 5): various roles
- 2002: Préjudices: Nadia Chianti
- 2002: Les grands frères, leading ep.: Malika
- 2001: Le juge est une femme, ep. L'Ami d'enfance: Malika

== Awards ==
- February 2018: tribute at the International Youth Film Festival in Meknès
- November 2017: tribute at the Festival méditerranéen cinéma et immigration in Oujda
- September 2017 : tribute at the Khouribga African Film Festival
- 2009: New Talent Award at the MedFilm Festival in Rome
- 2007: first prize for Feminine Role at Moroccan National Film Festival for her role in Lahcen Zinoun's Oud Al’ward ou La Beauté éparpillée.
