= African Federation of Film Critics =

Panafricanist federation of film critics' associations

- Abbreviation: AFFC
- Formation: 2004; 22 years ago
- Headquarters: Dakar, Senegal

African Federation of Film Critics (AFFC, French: Fédération africaine de la critique cinématographique, FACC), is a panafricanist federation of film critics' associations from Africa and the diaspora, as well as individuals. It was founded in 2004 and as of 2023 is composed of 43 associations and 456 editors. Its headquarters are in Senegal. It hosts a website called www.africine.org, known as Africiné.

== History ==
=== Birth of Africiné network ===
From 17 to 21 February 2003, a working group of 26 film critics from Senegal, Madagascar, Nigeria, and Burkina Faso convened in Ouagadougou, Burkina Faso. The group was led by Clément Tapsoba, Jean Roy and Olivier Barlet, and coordinated by FESPACO executive director Gervais Hien, with the support of the French government. An outcome of the gathering was the creation of an online user group, Africiné, composed of cultural journalists, to network and create content.

In July 2003, a similar four-day working group was organised in Tunis by the Tunisian Association for the Promotion of Film Criticism (ATPCC).

In June 2004, the Fonds des inforoutes de l'Agence intergouvernementale de la Francophonie (AIF) provided a grant to create the africine.org website, produce content for it, and organise workshops. The management the grant was overseen by the Africultures association from November 2005 through the end of 2009. The website continues to produce content about all aspects of film relating to Africa.

On 9 September 2004, a meeting of the film critics present at the International Women's Film Festival in Salé, Morocco, defined the objectives of the Africiné network:

- promote endogenous African writing on African cinema and improve its international visibility,
- encourage support at the film and media level for quality cinema with educational value,
- improve the inclusion of Africa in the international critical circuits and to promote critical confrontation at this level on African films,
- to provide quality content of documentary and analytical value on African cinema,
- to provide the public, researchers and programmers a thematic database on African films and the corresponding professional contacts,
- enable African journalists to watch new films and to have access to films in the repertoire as well as to fundamental works on cinema.

=== Foundation of AFFC ===
The African Federation of Film Critics (AFFC) was officially established in 2004. From 2 to 7 October 2004, the delegates of the Africiné network in attendance at the Carthage Film Festival decided to create a federation whose statutes and internal regulations were adopted. Its charter was to "establish a new approach in film criticism and to affirm one that is African, not because it is the only authentic and legitimate one, but because it is generally without visibility and unable to shape global perception of African cinema and African cultures". It ends with a quote from Paulin Soumanou Vieyra: "To accept criticism is to accept to be different and to think that one does not hold the absolute truth".

An executive board was elected :

- president : Clément Tapsoba (president of the association ASCRIC-B, Burkina Faso)
- 1st vice-president : Mohammed Bakrim (President of the Aflam Association of Film Critics of Morocco)
- 2nd vice-president : Jean-Marie Mollo Olinga (President of the Cinépresse association of Cameroonian film critics)
- secretary-general : Hassouna Mansouri (President of the TAPFC, Tunisian Association for the Promotion of Film Criticism)
- treasurer : Olivier Barlet (President of the association Africultures, France)

The headquarters are in Dakar and Thierno Ibrahima Dia was appointed administrator of the Africiné website and moderator of the internet discussion group.

=== Development ===
A first congress was organised at Fespaco in 2009, which elected a new board, composed of seven members:

- president : Baba Diop (Senegal)
- 1st vice-president : Francis Ameyibor (Ghana)
- 2nd vice-president : Clément Taspsoba (Burkina-Faso)
- 3rd vice-president : Kamel Ben Ouanès (Tunisia)
- secretary-general : Sani Soulé Manzo (Niger)
- secretary-general for communication : Jacques Bessala Manga (Cameroon)
- treasurer : Sitou Ayité (Togo)

In 2010, the AFFC is entrusted by the World Festival of Black Arts with the programming of screening-debates and the organisation of the Sembène/Chahine colloquium. The same year, the headquarters agreement was signed on 30 March in Dakar by the Minister of Foreign Affairs, Me Madické Niang. A meeting was held with 17 AFFC members at the 2011 Fespaco and 35 members at the 2013 Fespaco to consider improvements to the general functioning of the Federation and its governance. After consultation with all member associations, the statutes, rules and regulation were revised to reflect the growth of the Federation. On 17 and 18 December 2015, the AFFC organised a second ordinary congress in Marrakech with some thirty participants representing fifteen member countries to amend and adopt the new statutes and internal regulations, renew the governing bodies and outline the action plan. The Moroccan critic Khalil Demmoun was elected president and the executive board was renewed as follows:

- 1st vice-president : Mahrez Karoui (Tunisia)
- 2nd vice-president : Yacouba Sangaré (Ivory Coast)
- assistant secretary-general : Fatou Kiné Sène (Senegal)
- general treasurer : Pélagie Ng'onana (Cameroon)
- communication manager : Charles Ayetan (Togo)

The congress also adopted a three-year action plan for the AFFC for the period 2016–2018, with the objective of animating the life of the federation and the implementation of its mission to support African cinema. In 2020, the AFFC mourns the death of its first president, Clément Tapsoba. During the 26th edition of Fespaco, the Ordinary General Assembly of 28 February 2019 elects a new executive board with a majority of women.

- president : Fatou Kiné Sène (Senegal),
- 1st vice-president : Ahmed Shawky (Egypt)
- 2nd vice-president : Fatoumata Sagnane (Guinea)
- secretary-general : Abraham Bayili (Burkina-Faso)
- assistant secretary-general : Sahar El Echi (Tunisia)
- general treasurer : Pélagie NG’onana (Cameroon)
- communication manager : Charles Ayetan (Togo)

The General Assembly also elected two auditors: Renate Lemba (DRC) and Rodéric Dèdègnonhou (Benin).

=== Direction ===
Presidents of the AFFCC
Name	Nationality	Period of mandate
Clément Tapsoba	Burkina Faso	2004-2009
Baba Diop	Senegal	2009-2015
Khalil Demmoun	Morocco	2015-2019
Fatou Kiné Sène	Senegal	2019-2023
Fatoumata Sagnane	Guinea	since 2023

=== Executive Board ===
At the General Assembly on 2 March 2023 during Fespaco in Ouagadougou, a new executive board was elected, composed of :

- president : Fatoumata Sagnane (Conakry Guinea)
- 1st vice-president : Dr Hector Victor Kabré (Burkina Faso)
- 2nd vice-president : Pierre Patrick Touko (Cameroon)
- secretary-general : Sidney Cadot-Sambossi (France)
- assistant secretary-general : Dr. Youssoufa Halidou Harouna (Niger)
- treasurer : Bigué Bob (Senegal)
- communication manager : Yacouba Sangaré (Ivory Coast)

== Training Groups ==
Various training groups are organised during film festivals or on local initiatives to reinforce the structure of the Federation, particularly through the creation of national associations of film critics:

- Algeria : Tlemcen (Amazigh film Festival, 2007),
- Burkina Faso : Ouagadougou, in each edition of the Fespaco since 2003.
- Benin : Ouidah (Quintessence, 2005),
- Cameroon : Yaoundé (Black Screens, 2004 and 2005),
- Egypt : Louxor (Louxor African Film Festival 2013 and 2014)
- Gabon : Libreville (Gabonese Institute of Image and Sound Initiative, 2010)
- Ghana : Accra (NAFTI initiative, 2005),
- Guadelupe : Pointe-à-Pitre (FEMI, 2007),
- Guinea : Conakry (local initiative and French cooperation, 2013)
- Madagascar : Antananarivo (Madagascourt Film Festival, 2010),
- Maurice :Maurice University (Ile Courts Festival, 2017)
- Mauritanie : Nouakchott (Frontier Cinema Festival, 2014)
- Niger : Niamey (Niamey Documentary Film Forum, 2012)13
- Nigeria : Lagos (French Cooperation initiative, 2006),
- Senegal : Dakar (District Film Festival, 2005 - Senegalese Film Critic Association initiative - Dakar courts Festival 2007 and 2014, 2021 and 2022)
- RDC : Kinshasa (local initiative and French cooperation, 2013),
- Rwanda : Kigali (Mashariki Film Festival, 2017)
- Tunisie : Tunis (ATPCC initiative, 2004), Tunis (European film Festival, 2005).

== Database ==
Since October 2004, the AFFC, in collaboration with Africultures, has been developing a comprehensive database of films from and about Africa, African cinema personalities, professional organizations and industry news. It is integrated into the multidisciplinary Southplanet database Southplanet, which serves as the basis for the Africine and Africultures websites. At the beginning of 2023, the database listed nearly 22,000 films.

== Africine's Bulletin ==
For every edition of FESPACO since 2005, AFFC produces the Africine Bulletin, an 8-page film critics report that it distributes for free to festivalgoers.

== African Critics Juries - Paulin Soumanou Vieyra Award ==
In 1988, at the Third Conference of African Cinema in Khouribga, a jury of critics created the "Paulin Vieyra Award", which was awarded at FESPACO only once, in 2000.

Since 2009 the African Critics Award—renamed the Paulin Soumanou Vieyra Award in 2013 in honor of the first black African film critic— has been awarded by a jury of African critics organised by the AFFC in partnership with various African festivals. The award aims to encourage high quality cinema and support young emerging talents.

African Critics Award/Paulin Soumanou Vieyra Award
Year	Title of the film	Filmmaker	Country	Festival
2009	Teza	Haile Gerima	Ethiopia	FESPACO
2013	One Man's Show	Newton Aduaka	Nigeria	FESPACO
2014	Les Hommes d’argile	Mourad Boucif	Marocco	Festival International du film transsaharien de Zagora
2015	Starve Your Dog	Hicham Lasri	Marocco	FESPACO
2016	Starve Your Dog	Hicham Lasri	Marocco	Luxor African Film Festival
2016	Eshtebak (Clash)	Mohamed Diab	Egypt	Carthage Film Festival
2016	Les hommes d’argile	Mourad Boucif	Egypt	Festival international du film transsaharien de Zagora
2017	Serpent	Amanda Evans	South Africa	Durban International Film Festival
2017	Tant qu'on vit (Medan vi lever)	Dani Kouyaté	Burkina Faso	Festival international du film transsaharien de Zagora
2017	A Mile in My Shoes (film)	Said Khallaf	Marocco	FESPACO
2017	The Train of Salt and Sugar	Licínio Azevedo	Mozambique	Carthage Film Festival
2018	Sofia	Meryem Benm’Barek	Marocco	Carthage Film Festival
2018	Mama Bobo	Robin Andelfinger et Ibrahima Seydi	France, Senegal	Rencontres du film court Madagascar
2019	Indigo	Selma Bargach	Marocco	FESPACO
2019	You come from far away	Amal Ramsis	Egypt	Ismailia International Film Festival
2019	Un coin du ciel noir	Djingarey Maïga	Niger	Toukountchi Festival de Cinéma du Niger
2020	Awa (Here)	Deborah Basa	Republic of Congo	Rencontres du film court Madagascar
2021	The Gravedigger's Wife	Khadar Ayderus Ahmed	Somalia	FESPACO
2021	Argu	Omar Belkacemi	Algeria	Carthage Film Festival
2021	Tuk Tuk	Mohamed Kheidr	Egypt	Rencontres du film court Madagascar
2022	La Vie d’après	Anis Djaad	Tunisie	Carthage Film Festival
2023	Mami Wata	C. J. Obasi	Nigeria	FESPACO
2025	Katanga: The Dance of the Scorpions	Dani Kouyaté	Burkina Faso	FESPACO
