= Terminus des anges =

- Directed by: Narjiss Nejjar, Mohamed Mouftakir, Hicham Lasri
- Written by: Narjiss Nejjar, Mohamed Mouftakir, Hicham Lasri
- Produced by: Lamia Chraïbi
- Starring: Sanaa Akroud, Nadia Niazi, Salah Bensalem
- Cinematography: Xavier Castro
- Edited by: Julien Fouré
- Release date: 2010
- Running time: 105 minutes
- Country: Morocco
- Language: Moroccan Arabic

Terminus des anges (English: Angels' Last Stop) is a 2010 Moroccan anthology film directed by Mohamed Mouftakir, Hicham Lasri and Narjiss Nejjar, released in 2010. The film is a combination of three short films, each directed by a different director. It premiered at the National Film Festival of Tangier. The film tackles the subject of AIDS.

== Synopsis ==
The film starts in the middle of the night on a Casablanca street, where a woman suddenly finds herself arrested for prostitution, after a police search revealed she was carrying condoms. In the second part of the film directed by Mohamed Mouftakir, the first wife of an HIV-positive man who committed suicide, watches a video he left her explaining the reasons for his suicide. The last part of the film features two young people who meet for the first time and want to make love. The young man, a failed artist and dreamer, would like to do so without a condom. The young woman refuses in spite of the various far-fetched arguments of her companion. Finally, by chance, all the characters of the film end up at the police station.

== Cast ==
- Sana Akroud
- Sanâa Alaoui
- Bensalah Bensalah
- Nadia Niazi
- Ismael Kanater
- Bouchra Ahrich
- Driss Roukhe
