= Sana Akroud =

Moroccan actress, screenwriter, producer, and director

- Akroud in 2013
- Born: November 18, 1980 (age 45); Taroudant, Morocco
- Education: Ecole Supérieure Art Dramatique and Animation Culturelle
- Occupations: Actor filmmaker screenwriter film producer
- Years active: 1999–present
- Spouse: Mohammed Marouazi (2012-2022)

Sana Akroud (born November 18, 1980) is a Moroccan actress, filmmaker, screenwriter and film producer.

== Biography ==
She was born on November 18, 1980, in Taroudant, a city in the Sous region of Morocco. After graduating in 1997 from the Ecole Supérieure Art Dramatique and Animation Culturelle in Rabat.

Akroud then played in cinema, notably in Terminus des anges co-signed by Hicham Lasri, Narjiss Nejjar and Mohamed Mouftakir, and released in 2009. She starred in Ismail Saidi's Ahmed Gassiaux, released the same year, and in Yousry Nasrallah's Egyptian feature film Femmes du Cairo, released in 2012. Akroud also participated in distributions for television series, such as Yassine Fennane's Okba Lik.

== Filmography ==
=== As a director ===
Year	Title	Functioned as			Notes
Year	Title	Actress	Writer	Director	Notes
2011	The Five Seasons	No	Yes	Yes	
2013	Les Noces du Loup	Yes	Yes	Yes	Also executive producer
2015	Khnifist R'mad	Yes	Yes	Yes	Also producer
2020	Myopia	Yes	Yes	Yes	Also producer
2025	The Commandments	Yes	Yes	Yes	Also producer

=== As an actress ===
Year	title	Notes
2003	Douiba	Television film
2004	Maw'id Ma'a Lmajhoul	Drama series : 30 episodes
2005- 2007	Romana and Brtal	Historical series : 26 episodes
2006	Abdou with the Almohads	
2006	Lil Azwaj Faqat	Television film
2007	Whatever Lola Wants	
2007	Shrikty Moushkilty	Sitcom : 30 episodes
2007	Sunset	Television film
2008	Souk Nssa	Television film
2009	Scheherazade, Tell Me a Story	
2009	Okba Lik	Television film
2010	Terminus des anges	
2010	Ahmed Gassiaux	
2010	Okba Lik (the series)	Comedy Series : 30 episodes
2013	Les noces du Loup	Television film
2013	The Bait	Television film
2015	Khnifist R'mad	
2017	Momo Ainya	Comedy romantic series : 30 episodes
2019	Al Bahja Tani	Sitcom : 30 episodes
2020	Myopia	
2020	Little America	Episode 8 : The son
2025	The Commandments	

== See also ==
- Cinema of Morocco
