= Albas =

Albas may refer to:

- Albas, Aude, a commune in the Aude department, France
- Albas, Lot, a commune in the Lot department, France

== People with the surname ==
- Dan Albas (born 1976), Canadian politician
- Moses ben Maimon Albas (16th century), Moroccan kabbalist
- Samuel Albas (1697–1749), Moroccan rabbi
