= Abdelaâli Hadi =

Moroccan serial killer

- Born: Abdelaâli ben Brahim ben M'Barek Hadi; 1962; Taroudant, Morocco
- Died: May 6, 2022 (aged 59–60); Safi, Morocco
- Other names: "The Butcher of Taroudant", "The Deranged Killer of Taroudant"
- Conviction: Murder x9
- Penalty: Death

Details
- Victims: 9
- Span of crimes: 2000–2004
- Country: Morocco
- State: Souss-Massa
- Date apprehended: 2004

Abdelaâli Hadi (Arabic: عبد العالي الحاضي, Berber languages: ⵄⴱⴷ ⴰⵍⵄⴰⵍⵉ ⵄⵃⴰⴷⵉ, 1962 – May 6, 2022), known as The Butcher of Taroudant, was a Moroccan serial killer responsible for killing nine children, aged 11–16, between 2000 and 2004. He was later sentenced to death for his crimes.

== Early life ==
Abdelaâli ben Brahim ben M'Barek Hadi was born in 1962 to a modest family in Taroudant. His parents immigrated from the village of Ait Hadi, his father was a bread baker. He dropped out of school at age 11. After his mother's death, he moved to the Bensergao district of Agadir where he worked as a night watchman. Hadi was the victim of gang-rape by a group of street thugs at age 14. He moved back to Taroudant at age 16.

== Discovery of bodies ==
On August 20, 2004, local residents stumbled upon human remains including multiple skeletons and eight skulls, scattered throughout the Taroudant valley. They immediately contacted the police to report their findings. The discovery was widely covered by the national media. An autopsy report commissioned by the Agadir Court of Appeals, conducted by Saïd Louahlia, determined that the victims were adolescents between the ages of 13 and 16 and had died at least six months prior to the discovery. The report also stated that the bodies had been exhumed and then subsequently placed in the Taroudant Valley. Upon investigating, the authorities found that the bodies were transported to the valley on the night of August 19th. DNA collected from soil samples at the crime scene was matched to the parents of three of the deceased children, thus identifying them. When questioned, each of the parents stated that their child had worked at a road station in Taroudant, leading to heavy police surveillance and a search for the perpetrator in the area surrounding the station.

== Capture ==
Investigators discovered a piece of paper next to a collection of skulls that contained a poem with the date "12 October, Week 41, Adidas 55, Hadi 2303, Adidas 5" (Arabic: 12 أكتوبر، الأسبوع 41، أديداس 55، الحاضي 2303، أديداس 5). The paper was sent to a laboratory in Casablanca for analysis, to no avail. The investigators then shifted their focus to searching for any leads related to the name "Hadi" and after consulting a police database, found Najib Hadi, an employee at a nearby road station. When questioned, Najib revealed that he had a brother, Abdelaâli, who also worked at the station and lived in the Mahatta neighborhood of Taroudant. On August 7, 2004, police officers accompanied by Najib, went to Abdelaâli's house and were surprised when he opened the door and greeted them by saying, "I have been waiting for you to save me from my torture. I have been suffering day and night. I want to sleep and heal." When asked if he was the child murderer, he admitted that he was and was taken into custody. During his police interrogation, he confessed to every crime and provided the names of every victim. He also revealed that he had a 9th victim. The police concluded that his motive was to seek vengeance towards society following his gang-rape and that he also had pedophilia.

== Trial and death ==
On December 11, 2005, the Agadir Court of Appeals convicted Hadi of the murders and issued him a death sentence and a fine of 195,000 dirhams, after a year-long trial. During the trial, Hadi admitted to having a ninth victim and told the court that he derived pleasure from the murder of children, and reportedly even had an orgasm while choking his victims. Despite this, Hadi appeared to express remorse. When asked by the judge if he regretted his actions, he responded that it was "between me and God". He also explained that the poem written on the paper was a message to the police to look for a Hadi who wore Adidas shoes and that "55" represented handcuffs on both hands as "5" is a slang for handcuffs in Morocco. Hadi died on May 6, 2022, while on death row at Moul El Bergui Central Prison. The victims' families expressed indignation at the fact that Hadi had not been executed.

== See also ==
- List of serial killers by country
