= Claudio Bravo (disambiguation) =

Claudio Bravo (born 1983) is a retired Chilean footballer and current commentator.

Claudio Bravo may also refer to:

- Claudio Bravo (footballer, born 1997), Argentine footballer
- Claudio Bravo (painter) (1936–2011), Chilean painter
