= Delphe Kifouani =

Congolese filmmaker and writer

- Education: literature and French language
- Alma mater: Marien Ngouabi University
- Occupations: filmmaker and writer
- Notable work: Nos ambassadeurs / Our Ambassadors; Un ami est parti / A Friend is Gone; D'une rive à l'autre / From One Riverbank to the Other; La peau noire de dieu / The Black Skin of God

Delphe Kifouani is a Congolese filmmaker and writer on African cinema. He teaches cinema at the University of Saint-Louis, Senegal.

== Life ==
Kifouani studied at Marien Ngouabi University in Brazzaville, graduating with a BA in literature and French language in 2004 and an MA in French literature in 2006.

From One Riverbank to the Other (2009) follows the daily journeys of disabled people, crossing the River Congo to travel between Brazzaville and Kinshasa. In the words of critic Olivier Barlet:

a symphony of experiences imposes itself, a determined resourcefulness in which both determination and inventiveness and vitality weave possibilities. By filming them in a way that avoids wretchedness, showing their life force and their spiritual force, Kifouani eschews all sense of hopelessness.

== Works ==
=== Films ===
- Nos ambassadeurs / Our Ambassadors, 2008
- Un ami est parti / A Friend is Gone, 2008
- D'une rive à l'autre / From One Riverbank to the Other, 2009
- La peau noire de dieu / The Black Skin of God, 2016

=== Books ===
- (ed. with François Fronty) La diversité du documentaire de creation en Afrique. Editions L'Harmattan, 2015.
- De l'analogique au numérique. Cinémas et spectateurs d'Afrique subsaharienne: francophone à l'épreuve du changement. Editions L'Harmattan, 2016
