= Mohammed Marouazi =

Moroccan-Canadian film and television actor

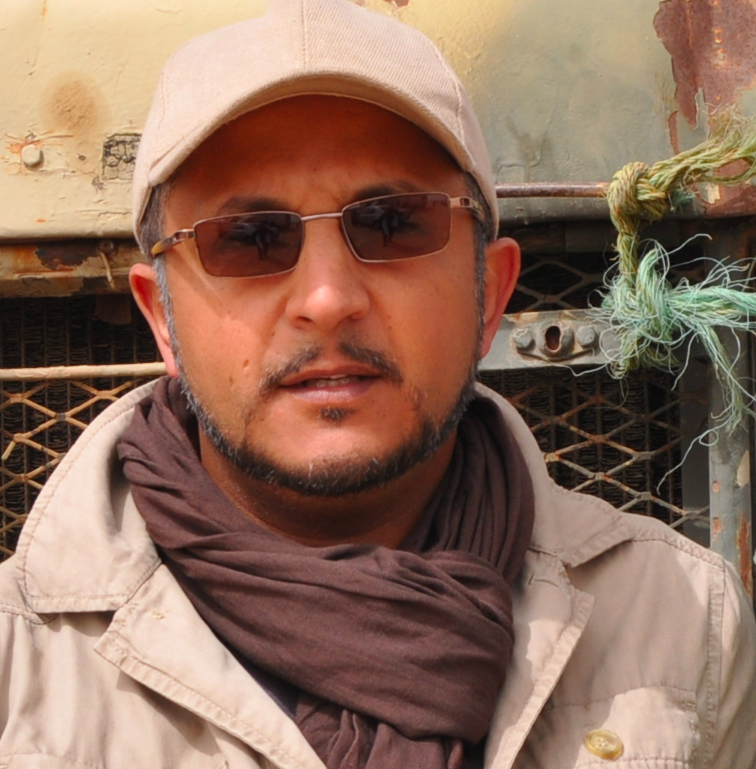
- Born: June 28, 1973 (age 52)
- Years active: 1996–present
- Spouse: Sana Akroud (2012-2022)

Mohammed Marouazi (born June 28, 1973) is a Moroccan actor currently based in Canada. He is most noted for his performance as Atif in the 2022 film Breathe (Respire), for which he received a Canadian Screen Award nomination for Best Supporting Performance in a Film at the 11th Canadian Screen Awards in 2023.

== Personal life ==
He was formerly married to Moroccan actress Sana Akroud. They first announced in 2019 that they were divorcing, before revealing in February 2020 that they were reuniting, but confirmed their divorce in 2022.

== Filmography ==
=== Films ===
- 1996 - Another Country in My Eyes (Di cielo in cielo)
- 1997 - Les amies d’hier
- 1998 - Love Without a Visa (Amour sans visa)
- 1998 - The Harem of Madame Osman (Le Harem de Madame Osman)
- 2000 - Leïla
- 2000 - Ali, Rabiaa and the Others (Ali, Rabiaa et les Autres...)
- 2001 - Tayf Nizar
- 2001 - La Rive des muets
- 2002 - Face to Face (Face à Face)
- 2004 - Memory in Detention (Mémoire en détention)
- 2006 - Shattered Wings (Ailes brisées)
- 2006 - Message reçu
- 2007 - Argana
- 2007 - Burned Hearts (Les Cœurs brûlés)
- 2007 - The Scent of the Sea (Rih lbhar/Parfum de Mer)
- 2011 - The Mother
- 2012 - L'enfant Cheikh
- 2014 - Frontieras (Al Houdoud)
- 2022 - Breathe (Respire)

=== Television ===
- 1999 - Aoualad Ennass
- 2000 - Douaer Ezzamane
- 2002 - Il bambino di betleheme
- 2002 - Le Papillon noir
- 2002 - Le journal de Wardia
- 2003 - Dilemme
- 2003 - L'Adieu
- 2004 - Poursuite
- 2005 - Déchirure
- 2007 - Les Eaux Noires
- 2007 - Soleil couchant
- 2007 - Petits secrets et gros mensonges
- 2008 - Mi taja
- 2009 - L'Étranger
- 2011 - Les cinq saisons
- 2011 - Kaboul Kitchen
- 2013 - 3orss Eddib (Les noces du loup)
- 2014 - Toile d'araignée
- 2015 - Les loups ne dorment jamais
- 2018 - Jack Ryan
- 2019 - Blood & Treasure
- 2020 - Toute la vie
