= Fissure (disambiguation) =

A fissure is a narrow crack or opening in the Earth's surface

Fissure or fissures may also refer to:

== Anatomy and healthcare ==
- Fissure (anatomy), a groove, natural division, deep furrow, elongated cleft, or tear in various parts of the body
- Fissure (botany), a split or crack; a line or opening of dehiscence.
- Fissure (dentistry), a break in the tooth enamel
- Sulcus (morphology), furrow or groove in the surface of a limb or an organ
- Sulcus (neuroanatomy), a large depression or groove in the cerebral cortex

== Geology ==
- Fissure vein, a vein of ore aggregated in a fissure
- Fissure vent, a linear volcanic vent through which lava erupts, usually without any explosive activity
- Ice fissure, deep fracture or crevasse in glaciology

== Art and entertainment ==
- Fissures (album), a 1997 album by Robert Rich and Alio Die
- Fissures (film), a 2009 film

== People ==
- Fissure (gamer), online alias of professional esports player Baek Chan-hyung
