= Headbang Lullaby =

2017 film

- Film poster
- Directed by: Hicham Lasri
- Written by: Hicham Lasri
- Starring: Aziz Hattab
- Release date: 12 February 2017 (Berlin)
- Running time: 111 minutes
- Countries: Morocco; France; Qatar; Lebanon
- Language: Moroccan Arabic

Headbang Lullaby is a 2017 Moroccan comedy film directed by Hicham Lasri. It was screened in the Panorama section at the 67th Berlin International Film Festival.

== Cast ==
- Aziz Hattab
- Latefa Ahrrare
- Hassan Ben Badida
- Zoubir Abou el Fadl
