= Muhammad al-Rudani =

Moroccan polymath

Mohammad al-Rudani
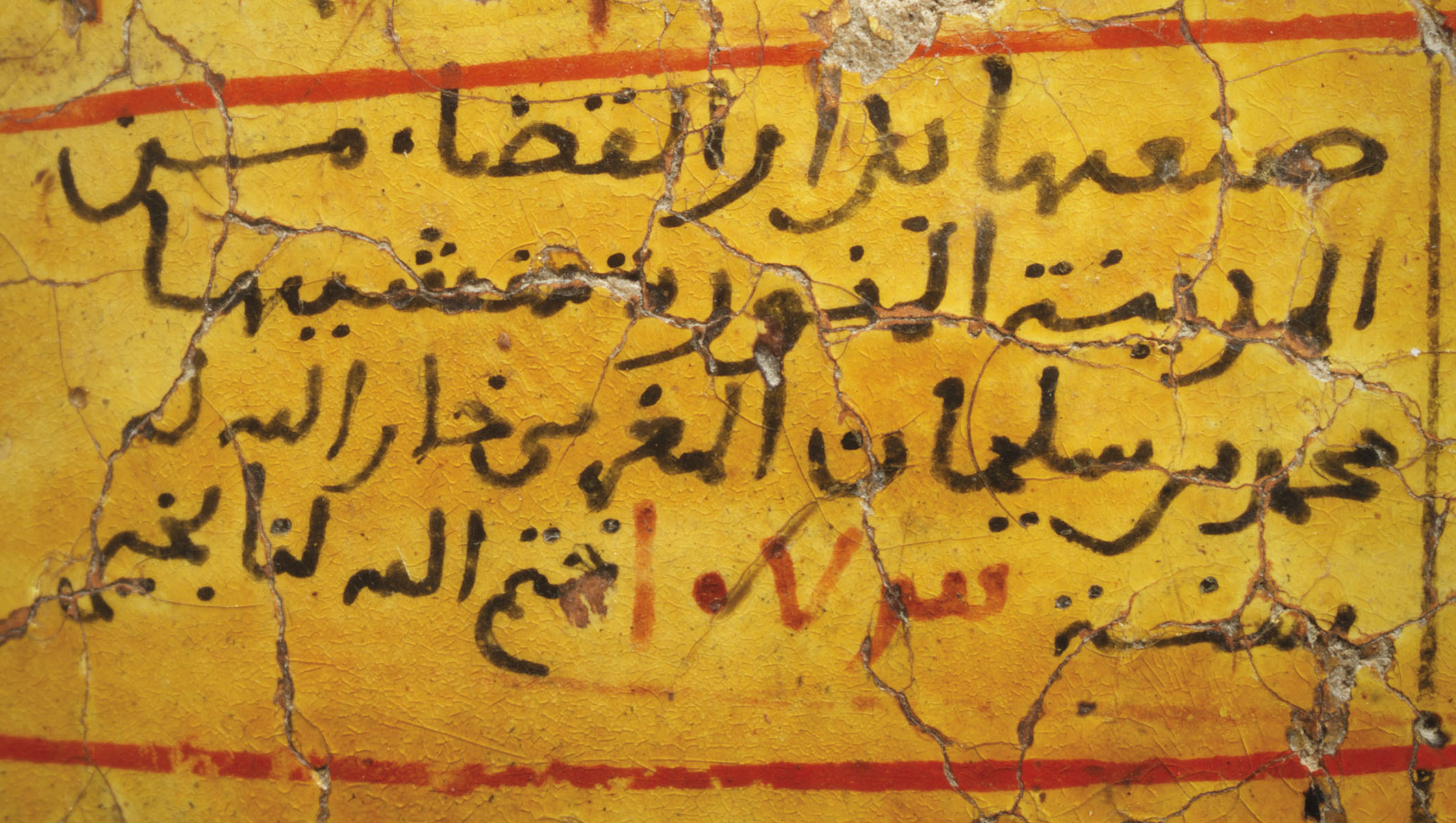
- Authorship cartouche on al-Rudani's astrolabe
- Born: Muhammad ibn Sulayman al‐Fasi ibn Tahir al‐Rudani al‐Susi c. 1627; Taroudant, Morocco
- Died: October 31, 1683 (aged 55–56); Damascus, Ottoman Empire
- Scientific career
- Fields: Astronomy; Poetry; Mathematics; Hadith; Tafsir; Grammar

Muhammad al-Rudani (Arabic: محمد بن سليمان الروداني) (Note: full name: Abū ʿAbdallāh Muḥammad ibn Sulaymān (Muḥammad) al‐Fāsī ibn Ṭāhir al‐Rudānī al‐Sūsī al‐Mālikī al‐Maghribī (Arabic: أبو عبد الله محمد بن سليمان الفاسي بن طاهر الروداني السوسي المالكي المغربي)) (c. 1627 – 1683) was a Moroccan polymath who was active as an astronomer, grammarian, jurist, logician, mathematician and poet.

== Biography ==
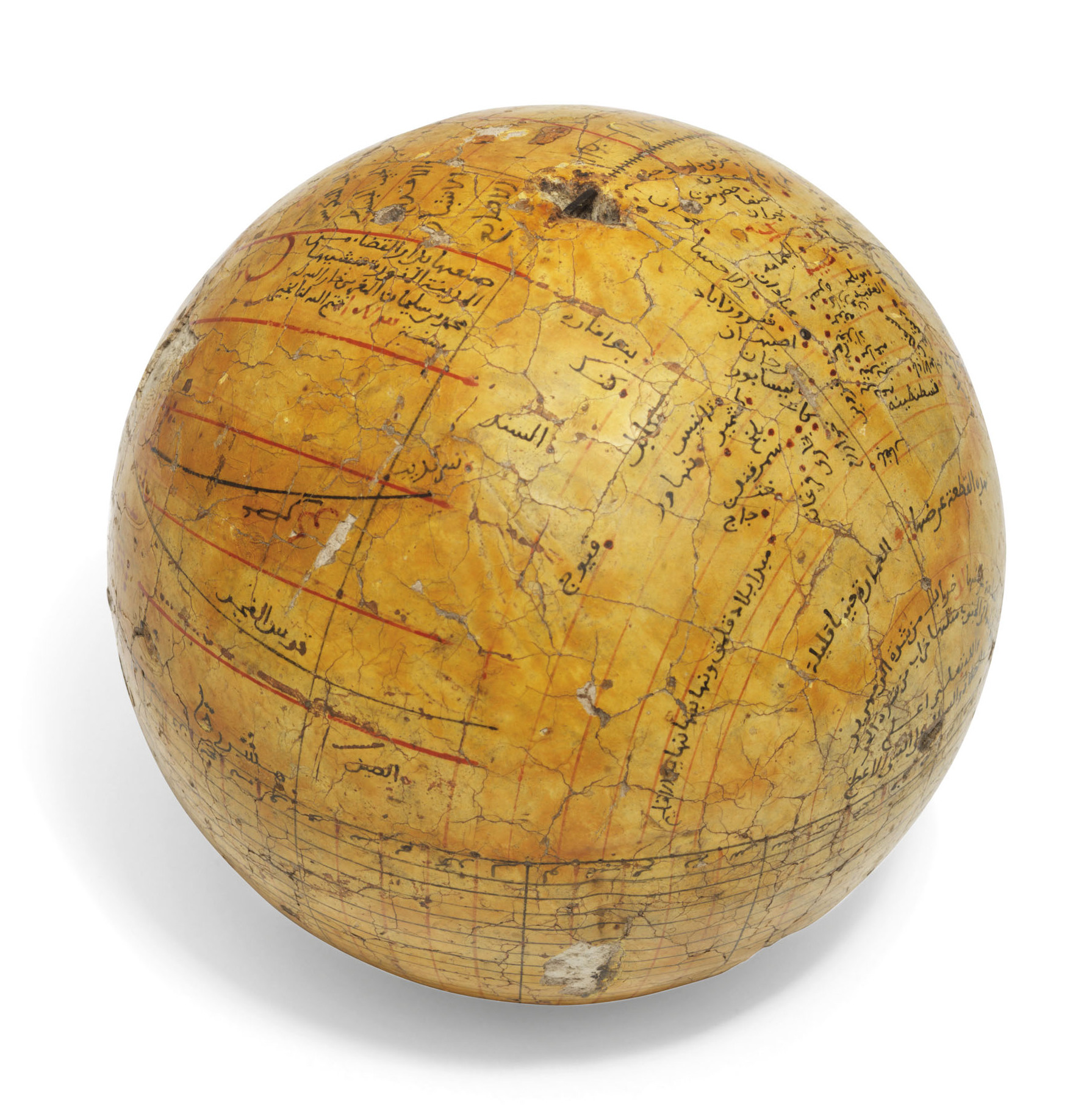
Astrolabe created by al-Rudani

Al-Rudani was born in c. 1627 in Taroudant. He was of Shilha origin. After studying in his hometown at the Great Mosque of Taroudant and its Madrasa, he continued his studies in the Zaouia Nasiriyya under Mohammed ibn Nasir for four years, the Zaouia of Dila, in Marrakesh and in Fez. His teachers in Morocco were: the theologian Isa al-Sugtani (d.1651), the chronologist Muhammad ibn Said al-Marghiti (d. 1679), and the grammarian Muhammad al-Murabit al-Dilai' (d. 1678). Afterwards, he left to study in the Islamic east. Thus, in the early 1650s, he stayed in Algiers, where he studied under the logician Said ibn Ibrahim Qaddura. In Egypt and the Levant, he studied under Ali al-Ajhuri, Shihab al-Din al-Khafaji, Shihab al-Din al-Qaliyubi, Muhammad ibn Ahmad al-Shubri, al-Shaikh Sultan, Khayr al-Din al-Ramli, Muhammad al-Naqib ibn Hamza al-Hasani and Ibn Balban. He got an ijazah from all of these scholars.

He died in Damascus on October 31, 1683.

== Works ==
Some of his works are:

- Silat al-khalaf bi-mawsūl al-salaf, an extensive record of the various chains of certifications he had received
- Bahjat al-tullāb fı̄ l-'amal bil-asturlāb, a treatise on the astrolabe
- Maqāsid al-'awālı̄ bi-qalā'id al-la'ālı̄, a didactic poem on ilm al-mı̄qāt (chronology) with a prose commentary
- al-Nāfi'a 'alā l-āla al-jāmi'a completed in 1661, a treatise describing the spherical astrolabe that he had constructed.
- Jam' al-fawā'id min Jāmi' al-usūl wa Majma' al-zawā'id, a compilation of hadith

== Sources ==
- Ayduz, Salim (2007). "Rudānī: Abū ʿAbdallāh Muḥammad ibn Sulaymān (Muḥammad) al-Fāsī ibn Ṭāhir al-Rudānī al-Sūsī al-Mālikī [al-Maghribī]". In Thomas Hockey; et al. (eds.). The Biographical Encyclopedia of Astronomers. New York: Springer. p. 990. ISBN 978-0-387-31022-0.
- Berque, Jacques (1955). "La littérature marocaine et l'Orient au XVIIe siècle". Arabica. 2 (3): 295–312. doi:10.1163/157005855X00031. ISSN 0570-5398. JSTOR 4054895.
- Hajji, Mohamed (2001). "al-Rudani, Muhammad ibn Sulayman". In Toufiq, Ahmed; Hajji, Mohamed (eds.). Ma'lamat al-Maghrib (Encyclopedia of Morocco) (in Arabic). Vol. 13. al-Jamī'a al-Maghribiyya li-l-Ta'līf wa-l-Tarjama wa-l-Nashr.
- El-Rouayheb, Khaled (2015). Islamic Intellectual History in the Seventeenth Century. Cambridge University Press. ISBN 978-1-107-04296-4.
