= Hicham Ayouch =

French Moroccan filmmaker

- Born: Paris, France
- Education: IUT Bordeaux
- Known for: Director, screenwriter
- Notable work: Fièvres, Abdelinho, Fissures
- Awards: Étalon de Yennenga

Hicham Ayouch is a French and Moroccan director and screenwriter best known for the films Fièvres, winner of FESPACO's Étalon de Yennenga, Fissures, and Abdelinho. A character-driven filmmaker, his films often explore themes of identity, marginalization, and the boundaries of human emotion.

== Early life and education ==
Hicham Ayouch was born in Paris to a French mother of Tunisian Jewish descent and Moroccan Muslim father. He grew up speaking French, Arabic, Italian, and Spanish. His father, Noureddine Ayouch, is the founder of Shem's Publicité, one of Morocco's oldest and largest advertising agencies. His brother is the director Nabil Ayouch.

After his parents' divorce, he spent much of youth in the Paris suburb of Sarcelles, visiting Casablanca in the summers. He attended IUT Bordeaux, where he studied journalism.

== Career ==
Ayouch's career began in 1999 as a television journalist and editor, and for the next fifteen years, worked for French television networks that included TF1, Canal + , TV5, France Télévision, and France 5.

In 2005, he directed his first feature, Les Reines du Roi (The King's Queens), a social documentary about the evolving status of women in Morocco. That same year he made his first short film, Bombllywood.

A year later, he directed his first feature film, Tizaoul (Les Arêtes du cœur), co-written with fellow Moroccan director Hicham Lasri. A social drama, the film is set in Tafdnar, a fishing village near Agadir, with non-professional actors speaking in the Shilha language. The film screened at the Regards sur les Cinémas du Monde section at the Montreal World Film Festival, and was nominated for several prizes at the Montpellier Film Festival.

In 2007, he directed his second feature-length documentary, Poussières d'ange (Angel's Dust), about autistic teenagers.

In 2008 Abu Dhabi's Middle East Film Festival awarded Ayouch the Sacha Grant. The $100,000 award given a promising emerging filmmaker, was to develop Samba Do Maazouz, which would eventually turn into his feature-length film Abdelinho.

Ayouch gained international attention with his second feature, Fissures, a 2009 drama set in Tangier about a love triangle between two men and an emotionally fragile Brazilian woman. The film was notable for its improvisational approach—with its actors performing without a formal script—and scenes involving sex and alcohol considered provocative by Moroccan standards. It premiered at the Festival National du Film de Tanger where it received the prizes for Best First Film, Best Supporting Actor, and Best Editing. It went on to screen at various festivals and at New York's Museum of Modern Art and the Tate Modern.

As They Say was Ayouch's second short film produced for the 2011 Sharjah Biennale. In 2012 it was in competition for the Teddy Award, a sub-program of the Berlinale. A Moroccan LGBT-themed story filmed with the Rif mountains as the backdrop, the film screened at other festivals that included the Cordoba African Film Festival (2012), Berlin Arab Film Festival 2012, and AFRIKAMERA (2016).

In 2013, the director released his third feature film, Fièvres (Fevers) a French production. Centered in a working class neighborhood of Paris, the film explores the tumultuous relationship between a father and his illegitimate teenage son who comes to live with him and his parents. Ayouch noted that the telling of this story was in part to remind audiences that French people of North African origin are not foreigners, and to challenge the stereotypes that the North African community holds about itself. The film earned Ayouch the 2015 Étalon de Yennenga, FESPCO's most prestigious prize, winning over Abderrahmane Sissako's Oscar-winning Timbuktu. Fièvres went on to win the Silver Alhambra, awarded to the Best Arab Film at the Festival de Granada Cines del Sur film festival. It premiered at the 2013 Marrakesh International Film Festival, where Slimane Dazi (the father) and Didier Michon (the son) jointly won the Best Actor Award.

In 2021, he released Abdelinho, a satirical comedy-drama that follows a young man from the small town of Azemmour, who is captivated by Brazilian culture, particularly samba and soap operas. The director's intent was to show the importance of dreaming and of art in the face of a conservative society that tries to repress anything that lies beyond its borders. The film, starring Aderrahim Tamimi and Ali Suliman premiered at the Festival National du Film de Tanger in September, and was released in Moroccan cinemas in January 2022 the following year.

=== Other activities ===
A multidisciplinary artist, Ayouch co-founded and is lead singer for Les Barons de Baltimore, a Moroccan band he co-founded in 2017, which blends poetry and electronic music with rock, jazz and African influences.

In April through June 2025 he performed in the one person show La Part du prépuce (The Part of the Foreskin) at the Théâtre du Gymnase in Paris. In a role written by Ayouch, he plays Abraham/Ibrahim, both Jewish and Muslim, who has lived his entire life under the weight of this dual identity.

In October 2025, he released a rap music video titled Guerriers de Lumière (“Warriors of Light”), which he directed, wrote, and performed.

== Personal life ==
Ayouch lives between Paris and Casablanca. A dual citizen of France and Morocco, he relates strongly to his African heritage. Accepting the Étalon de Yennenga award at FESPACO in 2015, he commented: "As you can see, my skin is white but the blood that runs through my veins is black. My father is Moroccan, my mother is Tunisian, I am African and proud to be so, because my culture is beautiful, powerful, poetic, and we must do everything to change attitudes through art, imagination and through education."

== Filmography ==
Year	Title	Category	Role	Ref
2005	Les Reines du Roi (The King's Queens)	feature documentary	writer, director	
2005	Bombllywood	narrative short film	writer, director	
2006	Tizaoul (Les Arêtes du cœur)	narrative feature film	co-writer, director	
2008	Poussières d’ange (Angel's Dust)	feature documentary	writer, director	
2009	Fissures	narrative feature film	writer, director	
2011	As They Say	narrative short film	co-writer, director	
2013	Fièvres (Fevers)	narrative feature film	co-writer, director	
2021	Abdelinho	narrative feature film	writer, director	
