= Where Atilla Passes =

2015 Canadian drama film

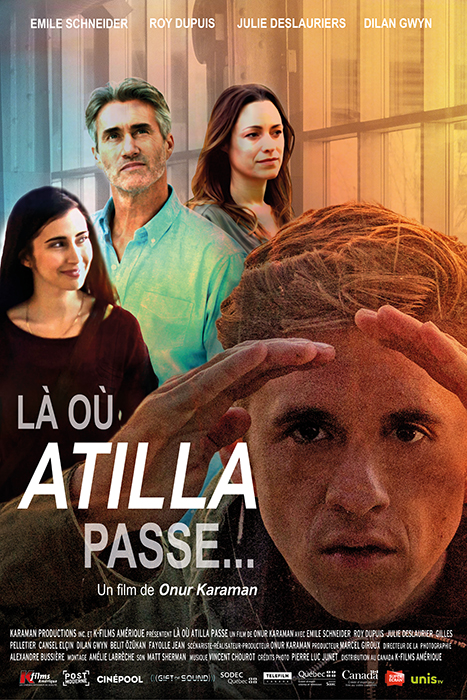
- Film poster
- French: Là où Atilla passe
- Directed by: Onur Karaman
- Written by: Onur Karaman
- Produced by: Marcel Giroux; Onur Karaman
- Starring: Émile Schneider; Roy Dupuis; Julie Deslauriers; Dilan Gwyn; Cansel Elçin
- Cinematography: Alexandre Bussière
- Edited by: Amélie Labrèche
- Production company: Karaman Productions
- Distributed by: K Films Amérique
- Release date: November 1, 2015 (Festival du cinéma international en Abitibi-Témiscamingue)
- Running time: 87 minutes
- Country: Canada
- Language: French

Where Atilla Passes (French: Là où Atilla passe) is a Canadian drama film, directed by Onur Karaman and released in 2015.

The film stars Émile Schneider as Atilla, the Turkish-born adopted son of Québécois couple Michel (Roy Dupuis) and Julie (Julie Deslauriers). Suffering from social anxiety and haunted by a vague inchoate memory of the family tragedy that led to his adoption, he is slowly drawn out of his shell by his interactions with Ahmet (Cansel Elçin), his new Turkish immigrant coworker, and Asya (Dilan Gwyn), a young woman with whom he begins a new romantic relationship.

The film premiered in November 2015 at the Festival du cinéma international en Abitibi-Témiscamingue, before going into general theatrical release in early 2016.

== Accolades ==
At the 19th Quebec Cinema Awards in 2017, Schneider received a nomination for Best Actor.
