= L'Amante du Rif =

2011 film by Narjiss Nejjar

- Directed by: Narjiss Nejjar
- Written by: Narjiss Nejjar
- Produced by: Narjiss Nejjar
- Cinematography: Maxime Alexandre
- Edited by: Julien Fouré, Jacques Comets
- Music by: Taha Al Haddad
- Release date: 2011
- Running time: 91 minutes
- Countries: Morocco; France; Belgium

L'Amante du Rif is a film co-produced by Morocco, Belgium and France, directed by Moroccan filmmaker Narjiss Nejjar and released in 2011. The film, a loose adaptation of the novel of the same name written by Nejjar's mother, Noufissa Sbaï, was screened at multiple film festivals.

== Synopsis ==
The film, set in Chefchaouen, chronicles the tragic destiny of Aya, a rebellious young woman who crosses paths with a drug trafficker, The Baron.

== Cast ==
- Nadia Kounda (Aya)
- Mourade Zeguendi (The Baron)
- Ouidad Elma (Radia)
- Nadia Niazi (Aya's mother)
- Fehd Benchamsi (Ahed)
- Omar Lotfi (Hafid)
- Siham Assif (prison guard)
- Raoula (diva)
