= Un novio para Yasmina =

- Directed by: Irene Cardona
- Screenplay by: Irene Cardona; Nuria Villazán
- Starring: Sanâa Alaoui; José Luis García Pérez; María Luisa Borruel; Francisco Olmo; Paca Velardiez; José Antonio Lucía
- Cinematography: Ernesto Herrera
- Edited by: Jorge Berzosa
- Music by: Oscar López-Plaza
- Production companies: Tragaluz; Tangerine Cinema Services
- Release date: 2008
- Running time: 95'
- Countries: Spain; Morocco
- Languages: Spanish; Arabic; French

Un novio para Yasmina is a 2008 Spanish-Moroccan film directed by Irene Cardona starring Sanâa Alaoui and José Luis García Pérez. It is shot in Spanish, Arabic and French. The screenplay was penned by Cardona alongside Nuria Villazán. It is a Tragaluz and Tangerine Cinema Services production.

== Synopsis ==
Lola loves weddings, but her marriage is in crisis and she suspects that Jorge, her husband, has fallen in love with Yasmina. Yasmina wants to marry Javi as soon as possible, but Javi, a local policeman, prefers to take it slowly. Alfredo doesn't believe in marriage, but he wouldn't mind marrying for friendship... or money. The film is a summer tale concerning arranged marriages, social commitment and life as a couple.

== Awards ==
- Festival de cine español (Málaga, 2008)
