= Starve Your Dog =

2015 film

- Directed by: Hicham Lasri
- Written by: Hicham Lasri
- Starring: Latefa Ahrrare
- Cinematography: Said Slimani
- Release date: 20 September 2015 (TIFF)
- Running time: 94 minutes
- Country: Morocco
- Language: Arabic

Starve Your Dog is a 2015 Moroccan drama film directed by Hicham Lasri. It was screened in the Contemporary World Cinema section of the 2015 Toronto International Film Festival. It was also shown in the Panorama section of the 66th Berlin International Film Festival.

== Cast ==
- Latefa Ahrrare
- Jirari Ben Aissa
- Fehd Benchemsi
- Jalila Temlsi
- Adil Abatorab
- Salma Eddlimi
