= Onur Karaman =

Turkish-born Canadian film director and screenwriter

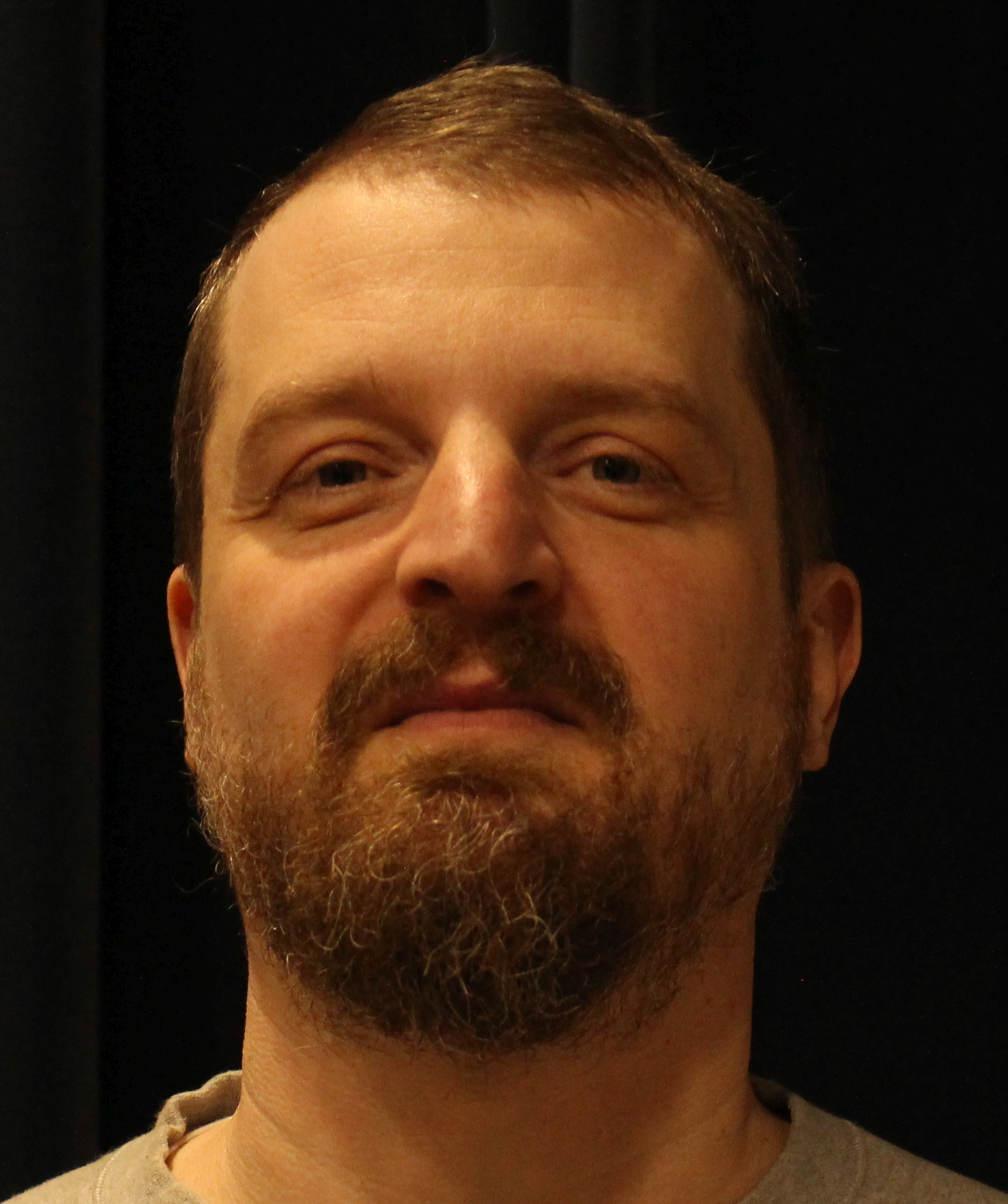
- Onur Karaman March 2023
- Born: 20 December 1981 (age 43); Turkey
- Occupations: Film director; screenwriter; film editor; producer
- Years active: 2006–present

Onur Karaman (born 1981) is a Turkish-born Canadian film director and screenwriter. He is best known for his films Where Atilla Passes (Là où Atilla passe) and Breathe (Respire).

Karaman moved to Canada with his family in childhood. He directed a number of short films before releasing The Urban Farm (La ferme des humains) as his full-length feature debut in 2014.

== Filmography ==
- Le Ride - 2006
- Stations - 2009
- R'en-donner - 2010
- L'histoire d'un malade - 2011
- The Urban Farm (La ferme des humains) - 2014
- Where Atilla Passes (Là où Atilla passe) - 2015
- Guilt (Le Coupable) - 2019
- Breathe (Respire) - 2022
- Emptiness - TBA
