= Mohammed Bakrim =

Moroccan film critic

Mohammed Bakrim is a Moroccan film critic. He was President of the Aflam Association of Film Critics and Journalists (Morocco) and vice president of the African Federation of Film Critics (FACC). Bakrim was also the spokesperson of Morocco's national film center (CCM). Author of numerous analysis and film reviews, he is a regulator contributor to newspaper Libération and magazine Cinémag.

== Publications ==
- 2007: Le Désir permanent. Chroniques cinématographiques
- 2011: Impressions itinérantes, Chroniques cinématographiques
