= Canadian Screen Award for Best Supporting Performance in a Film =

Discontinued annual Canadian media award

The Canadian Screen Award for Best Supporting Performance in a Film was an award presented by the Academy of Canadian Cinema and Television as part of the Canadian Screen Awards program, to honour the best supporting performance in a theatrical film.

It was a merger of the former awards for Best Supporting Actor and Best Supporting Actress, following the academy's announcement in August 2022 that it would start presenting gender-neutral acting awards instead of gendered ones. The category was presented only at the 11th Canadian Screen Awards in 2023; beginning with the 12th Canadian Screen Awards in 2024, it was split into new categories for Best Supporting Performance in a Comedy Film and Best Supporting Performance in a Drama Film.

== 2020s ==
Year	Actor	Film	Ref
2022; 11th Canadian Screen Awards
2022; 11th Canadian Screen Awards	Aaron Pierre	Brother	
2022; 11th Canadian Screen Awards	Marsha Stephanie Blake	Brother	
2022; 11th Canadian Screen Awards	K. C. Collins	White Dog (Chien blanc)	
2022; 11th Canadian Screen Awards	Jean-Luc Kanapé	Nouveau Québec	
2022; 11th Canadian Screen Awards	Mohammed Marouazi	Breathe (Respire)	
2022; 11th Canadian Screen Awards	Sara Montpetit	Falcon Lake	
2022; 11th Canadian Screen Awards	Leili Rashidi	Summer with Hope	
2022; 11th Canadian Screen Awards	Nadia Tereszkiewicz	Babysitter	
