= Mourade Zeguendi =

Belgian-Moroccan actor

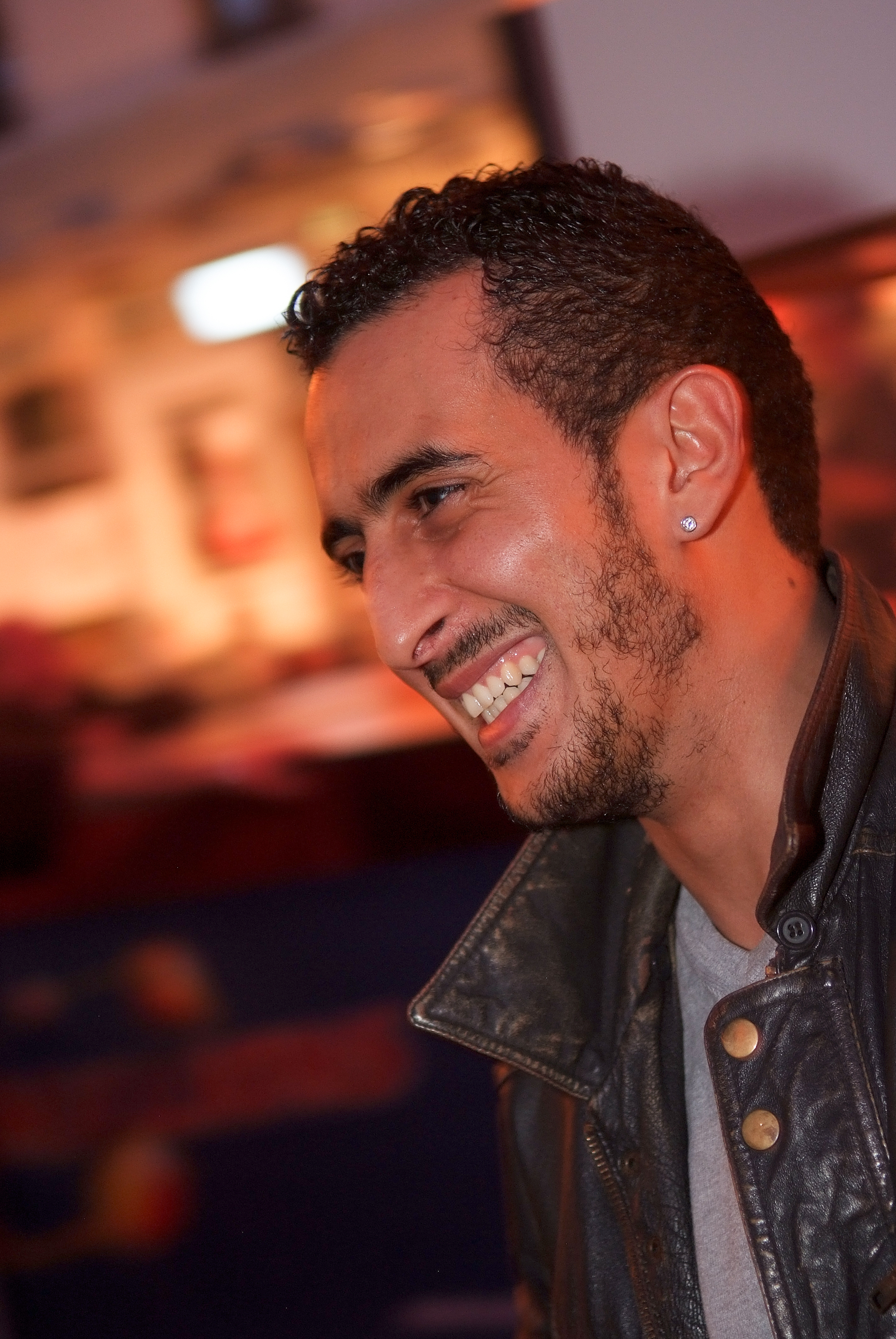

Mourade Zeguendi (born 30 October 1980 in Saint-Josse-ten-Noode) is a Belgian-Moroccan actor.

== Career ==
Zeguendi began his career in theatre, founding Union Suspecte, an independent theatre group, alongside Chokri and Zouzou Ben Chikha in 2003.

In 2017, he turned down a role in a Brian De Palma film after the director offered him a role as a Molenbeek terrorist.

== Partial filmography ==
=== Film ===
- 2005: Dikkenek
- 2006: Taxi 4
- 2007: Go Fast
- 2008: JCVD
- 2008: Barons
- 2011: I Will Survive
- 2011: L'amante du Rif
- 2014: Plan Bart
- 2015: Certified Halal
- 2015: Timgad
- 2024: Death Will Come

=== Television ===
- 2019: Sawah
- 2020: Undercover
