= Dilan Gwyn =

Swedish actress (born 1987)

- Born: 4 June 1987 (age 39); Stockholm, Sweden
- Education: Paris-Sorbonne University; Stockholm University; American Academy of Dramatic Arts
- Occupation: Actress
- Years active: 2007–present
- Children: 1
- Website: www.dilangwyn.com

Dilan Gwyn (born 4 June 1987) is a Swedish actress who has worked in Sweden, France, England, Canada, and the United States. Her films include Where Atilla Passes (2015), The Convent (2018), and Sisters in Arms (2019). On television, she is known for her roles in the Freeform series Beyond (2016–2018) and the Viaplay series Älska mig (2019–2020).

== Early life ==
Gwyn was born in Stockholm to parents who had fled Turkey in 1981 with her two older sisters. Regarding her ethnicity, she has said "I'm Armenian, Circassian, Greek, Kurdish and Turkish." Her father, Orhan Kotan, was a Kurdish writer and human rights activist who died when she was 11 years old.

She studied at Paris-Sorbonne University in Paris and Stockholm University. She trained in performing arts with the American Academy of Dramatic Arts, first at the Los Angeles campus and then the Manhattan campus, graduating in 2010.

== Career ==
In 2012, Gwyn made her feature film debut in Shoo Bre and Plastic Films. Then in 2014, she made her television debut as Yana in the second season of the Starz historical fantasy series Da Vinci's Demons and appeared in the fantasy horror film Dracula Untold. Gwyn starred in the 2015 Canadian drama film Where Atilla Passes (French: Là où Atilla passe).

From 2016 to 2018, Gwyn starred as Willa Frost in both seasons of the Freeform science fiction series Beyond. This was followed by roles in the 2018 films The Convent, a British horror film, and It's All About Love (Swedish: Lyckligare kan ingen vara), a Swedish comedy-drama. In 2019, Gwyn starred in the French war film Sisters in Arms (French: Sœurs d'armes) and began playing Elsa in the Viaplay series Love Me (Swedish: Älska mig).

== Personal life ==
Gwyn lives in West Stockholm with her husband Emil and their daughter, born December 2021 at the Karolinska Hospital. She has also lived in London, Amsterdam, and Istanbul.

== Filmography ==
=== Film ===
Year	Title	Role	Notes
2007	Workshopen		Short film
2008	Angels in the Snow (Swedish: Snöänglar)	The Friend	Short film
2011	The Delivery	Young Ruth	Short film
2011	Black Coffee	Vanessa	Short film
2012	Shoo Bre	Zeynep	
2012	Plastic Films	Erica	
2014	Dracula Untold	Governess	
2015	K7	Marian	Short film
2015	Where Atilla Passes (French: Là où Atilla passe)	Asya	
2018	The Convent	Alice Langley	
2018	It's All About Love (Swedish: Lyckligare kan ingen vara)	Ebba	
2019	Sisters in Arms	Zara	
2020	The Evil Next Door (Swedish: Andra sidan)	Shirin	
2022	The Woman Under the Bed	Sloan	
2024	Reapers	Rush	
2026	Earth Song (Finnish: Maan laulu)	Rojin	

=== Television ===
Year	Title	Role	Notes
2014	Da Vinci's Demons	Yana	3 episodes
2016–2018	Beyond	Willa Frost	Main role
2019–2020	Love Me (Swedish: Älska mig)	Elsa	Main role
2020	Paragon: The Shadow Wars	Rush	3 episodes
2021	Two Sisters (Swedish: Två systrar)	Alicia	Main role
2022	Kronprinsen som försvann	Drottning Lovisa	24 episodes
2023	The Turkish Detective	Leyla Pamuk	7 episodes
2025	Blind Spot (Swedish: Blindspår)	Feriha	2 episodes
2025–present	Maffia	Clara	
2025	Beck	Nina Gonzalez	1 episode

=== Video games ===
- A Way Out (2018)
