= Aaron Sabaoni =

Moroccan rabbi (17th century–??)

Aaron Sabaoni was a rabbi, editor, and merchant in Salé, Morocco in the mid-17th century.

Sabaoni belonged to the Siboni (al-Sabʿuni) family of rabbis based in Salé. His sons Joshua and David were also rabbis in Salé in the late 17th century. They wrote many homilies, of which manuscripts survived. Although it has been conjectured that he was named after the city of Sabbionetta, in the seventeenth century he resided in Salé.

Sabaoni was the editor of Moses ben Maimon Albas's kabbalistic ritual, Hekal ha-Ḳodesh (printed in Amsterdam in 1653), to which he added notes.

With Jacob Sasportas, Sabaoni participated in the condemnation of the Sabbateans (followers of mystic rabbi and self-proclaimed messiah Shabtai Tzvi) for refusing to keep the four chief fast-days on the grounds that the Messiah had already arrived. Sabaoni corresponded with Sasportas when the latter was in Amsterdam, and spent some time in the city as an international merchant. In one letter, he describes the expulsion of Jews from Spanish-ruled Oran, Algeria, on Passover 1669, and the transformation of its synagogue into a church.
