= Jahilya =

- Directed by: Hicham Lasri
- Produced by: Hicham Lasri
- Starring: Moustapha Haouari; Salma Eddlimi; Hassan Ben Badida
- Release date: February 18, 2018 (Berlin)
- Country: Morocco
- Language: Moroccan Arabic

Jahilya is a 2018 Moroccan film directed and produced by Hicham Lasri. The film stars Moustapha Haouari, Salma Eddlimi and Hassan Ben Badida.

== Plot ==
The film tells the story of a group of people in 1996 when the Moroccan king at that time Hassan II cancelled the Eid Al Adha. Lutfi developed amnesia and Mounir is rejected by the family of a girl he wants to marry. The group also includes a boy who does not understand the reasons for the cancellation and another who wants to commit suicide.

== Release ==
Jahilya premiered at the 68th Berlin International Film Festival, marking Lasri's sixth film to participate in eight years. It featured at the 2018 Cairo International Film Festival, playing in the Horizons of New Arab Cinema Competition.
