= Breathe (2022 film) =

2022 Canadian drama film

- French: Respire
- Directed by: Onur Karaman
- Written by: Onur Karaman
- Produced by: Patrick Bilodeau; Onur Karaman
- Starring: Amedamine Ouerghi; Frédéric Lemay; Mohammed Marouazi
- Cinematography: Simon Lamarre-Ledoux
- Edited by: Onur Karaman
- Music by: Frédéric "Paco" Monnier
- Production companies: UGO Média; Karaman Productions
- Distributed by: K Films Amérique
- Release date: November 7, 2022 (Cinemania)
- Running time: 90 minutes
- Country: Canada
- Language: French

Breathe (French: Respire) is a Canadian drama film, directed by Onur Karaman and released in 2022. The film centres on a Moroccan family of immigrants to Quebec, who have fallen on hard times when patriarch Atif (Mohammed Marouazi), a professional engineer, cannot secure a job in his field due to his lack of Canadian work experience and has been reduced to managing a restaurant; one day, however, his teenage son Fouad (Amedamine Ouerghi) is drawn into a racially motivated conflict with Max (Frédéric Lemay), a pure laine québécois who blames immigrants for his lot in life.

The cast also includes Claudia Bouvette, Vincent Fafard, Guillaume Laurin, Roger Léger and Houda Rihani.

The film premiered at the Cinemania film festival on November 7, 2022, before going into commercial release on January 27, 2023.

== Awards ==
At Cinemania, it won the award for Best Quebec Film.

Marouazi received a Canadian Screen Award nomination for Best Supporting Performance in a Film at the 11th Canadian Screen Awards in 2023.
