= Death Will Come =

- French: La Mort viendra
- Directed by: Christoph Hochhäusler
- Screenplay by: Christoph Hochhäusler; Ulrich Peltzer
- Produced by: Bettina Brokemper
- Starring: Sophie Verbeeck; Louis-Do de Lencquesaing
- Cinematography: Reinhold Vorschneider
- Edited by: Stefan Stabenow
- Music by: Nigji Sanges
- Production companies: Heimatfilm; Amour Fou; Tarantula
- Release date: August 8, 2024 (Locarno)
- Running time: 101 minutes
- Countries: Germany; Belgium; Luxembourg
- Language: French

Death Will Come (French: La Mort viendra) is a 2024 noir thriller directed by Christoph Hochhäusler from a screenplay by Hochhäusler and novelist Ulrich Peltzer. The film stars Sophie Verbeeck and Louis-Do de Lencquesaing.

== Premise ==
A female contract killer is hired by a well-known gangster to help him enact a revenge plot, but soon finds herself in danger.

== Cast ==
- Sophie Verbeeck
- Louis-Do de Lencquesaing
- Marc Limpach
- Mourade Zeguendi
- Nassim Rachi
- Hilde Van Mieghem

== Production ==
Principal photography began on 1 March 2023 in Brussels; additional filming took place in Saint-Idesbald (on the belgian coast), Luxembourg and Cologne.

== Release ==
Death Will Come premiered on 8 August 2024 during the Concorso Internazionale section of the 77th Locarno Film Festival.

== Reception ==
=== Accolades ===
Award	Ceremony date	Category	Recipient(s)	Result	Ref.
Locarno Film Festival	17 August 2024	Golden Leopard	Death Will Come	Nominated	
