= Africultures =

African cultural journal

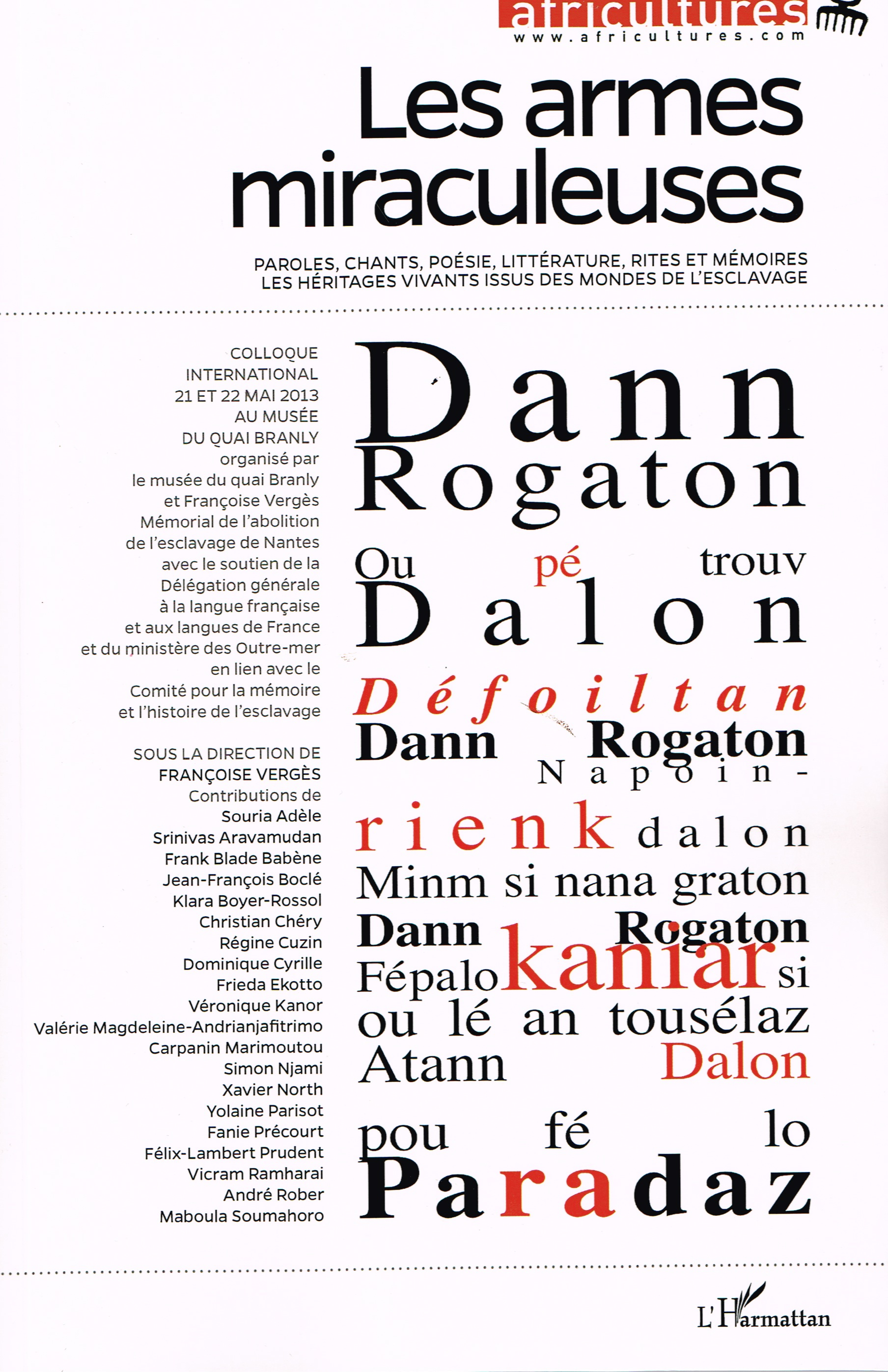
- Africultures
- Editor: Olivier Barlet
- Categories: Literary magazine
- Frequency: Quarterly
- Publisher: L'Harmattan
- First issue: 1997
- Company: Association Africultures
- Country: France
- Based in: Paris
- Language: French
- Website: https://africultures.com/
- ISSN: 1276-2458 (print); 2271-1732 (web)

Africultures is a publication of arts and culture about and from Africa and its diasporas. Based in Paris, it was founded in 1997 under the impetus of Olivier Barlet by journalists and academics such as Virginie Andriamirado, Gérald Arnaud, Tanella Boni, Sylvie Chalaye, Christophe Cassiau-Haurie, Fayçal Chehat, Soeuf Elbadawi, Boniface Mongo-Mboussa, etc. The magazine is managed by the association Africultures and it is published by L'Harmattan. Since 2012 the documentation produced by the magazine and its database made of over 45,000 biographies of artists and 55,000 description of books, music, films and institutions has been released under the open Creative Commons attribution share alike license.

In July 2007 it launched, 10 years after its creation, another organ, Afriscope, devoted to news on the same field, arts and culture related to Africa and African diasporas, while also covering topics related to social life.

Africultures now focuses its activity on its website. In 2021, it exceeded 10,000 news or reflection articles, videos and podcasts.

== Content of the publication ==
Every issue of the Africultures journal is devoted to a specific topic.

Initially published monthly on 96 and then 128 pages in 13x21.5 cm format, Africultures became a quarterly magazine from issue 54 of January–March 2003 onwards, with approximately 250 pages in 16x24 cm format. Co-published by the publisher L’Harmattan and the association Africultures, it published 106 issues until 2017.

Africultures maintains an online archive of artists, films, music, books and institutions based in or working in Africa and the Caribbean. The multilingual archive released with the Creative Commons attribution share alike license is on the Africultures website and on SPLA Sud Planète, a joint multilingual collaboration among international partners. SPLA Sud Planète has produced national portals of cultural information for Burkina Faso, Mali and Cameroon.

== Free License ==
Since 2012, its entire database, entitled Sudplanète (spla / Southplanet), the largest in the world on the subject, of more than 80,000 biographies of artists and descriptions of books, records, films and DVD's, shows and cultural organisations and institutions, is published under the Creative Commons Attribution-Share Alike License. It is managed and owned collectively by the partners who contribute to and use it.

== Book collections ==
Africultures manages a collection within the L’Harmattan publishing house: the Africultures library.

Furthermore, in co-publication with Africultures and Filigrane Edition, Afriphoto is a collection of 12x16.5 cm albums on African photographers, including Mamadou Konaté, Malick Sidibé, Abel Sumo Gayvolor, Isaac Bruce Hudson Vanderpuje, Ganiyu Owadi, Gerald L. Annan-Forson, Philippe Koudjina, Francis Nii Obodai Provençal, Paul Kabré, Germain Kiemtoré, Zaynab Toyosi Oduns, Bill Akwa Bétoté, Omar D., Emeka Okereke, Mathe Kebofhe, Philippe Koudjina, Fouad Hamza Tibin, Mohamed Yahia Issa, Bruno Boudjelal and Gabriel Fasunon.

== Afriscope publishing ==
A free magazine, Afriscope, is designed by the editorial staff of Africultures and distributed for the first time on 12 July 2007, during a concert at the Place de la Bastille. While Africultures aims to be a publication for in-depth analysis and reflection, the free magazine (bimonthly) is devoted to current events. The articles are written by journalists, and also cover, beyond arts and culture, more social and everyday issues like citizenship, fight against discrimination, employment, education, health, etc. The editor-in-chief is Anne Bocandé. Its founder Ayoko Mensah said: "The creativity of contemporary artists from Africa or its diaspora and the initiatives of citizens of African origin go almost unnoticed. We want to change this. With this free magazine, we offer an accessible medium, able to reach the general public, beyond identity and social divides.”

This complementary publication receives financial support from a number of organisations and local authorities, in particular the Ile-de-France Region, the National Agency for Social Cohesion and Equal Opportunities (Acsé) and the Paris City Hall. This illustrated 32-page magazine in 21x29.7 cm format, distributed mainly in cultural venues in Ile-de-France, is published until issue 53 in December 2017.

== Specialised sites ==
Through its relations with structures or initiatives in Africa, the Africultures association has developed specialised websites, interactive thematic portals now owned by the respective associations: Africiné with the African Federation of Film Critics (FACC), Afrilivres which presents non-academic titles published by French-speaking African publishers grouped together in the Cotonou-based Afrilivres association, Afrithéâtre which presents a detailed analysis of a large number of plays by African playwrights, AfriBD which brings together information on African comics.

The collectively owned Sudplanète database (shortened to SPLA) also includes cultural portals for all ACP countries. It operates as a wiki and allows any artist or cultural organisation to enter and update their information via forms accessible on the "self page".
