= Nadia Niazi =

Moroccan actress

- Occupation: actress.
- Notable work: L'amante du Rif

Nadia Niazi is a Moroccan actress.

== Filmography ==
- 2009: Terminus des anges
- 2010: La famille marche à l'ombre
- 2011: L'amante du Rif
- 2013: Exit Maroc
- 2013: C'est eux les chiens
- 2015: Ta mère !
- 2018: Apatride
- 2018: Sofia
