= Moses ben Maimon Albas =

16th-century Moroccan kabbalist

Rabbi Moses ben Maimon Albas
- משה בן מימון אלבאז
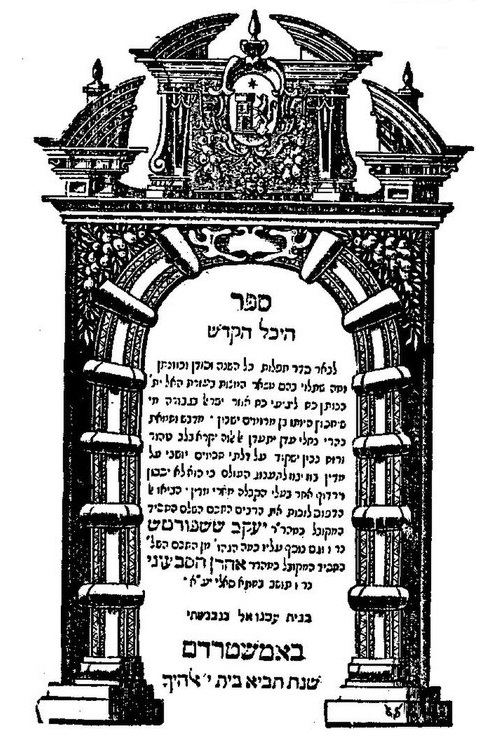
- Title page of "Hekal haḳodesh" (Amsterdam, 1653)

Personal life
- Parent: Maimon Albas (father)

Religious life
- Religion: Judaism

Jewish leader
- Main work: "Hekal haḳodesh" (Hebrew: היכל הקדש)
- Residence: Taroudant, Morocco

Moses ben Maimon Elbaz (Hebrew: משה בן מימון אלבאז) was a kabbalist who lived in Taroudant, Morocco, in the 16th century.

== Work ==
Albas was the author of the kabbalistic work "Heichal haKodesh" (The Holy Temple), which he began at Taroudant in 1575. It is a commentary on the Siddur (Jewish prayer-book), compiled from the Zohar and other kabbalistic works, was edited and translated by Aaron Sabaoni and published with an introduction by Jacob ben Aaron Sasportas, in 1653, at Amsterdam.
