= Taroudant =

City in Souss-Massa, Morocco

Taroudant: تارودانت (Arabic); ⵜⴰⵔⵓⴷⴰⵏⵜ (Standard Moroccan Tamazight)
- City
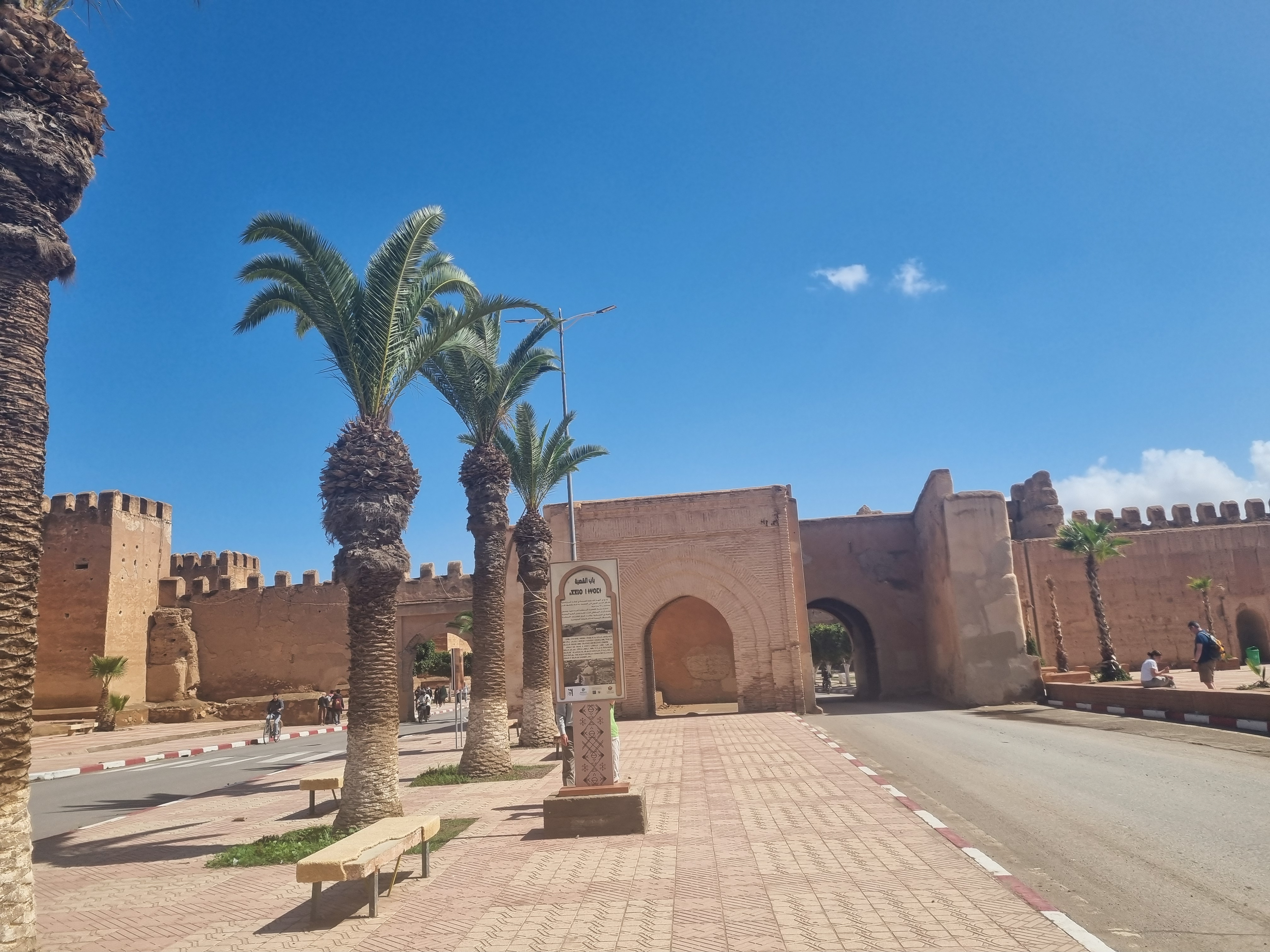
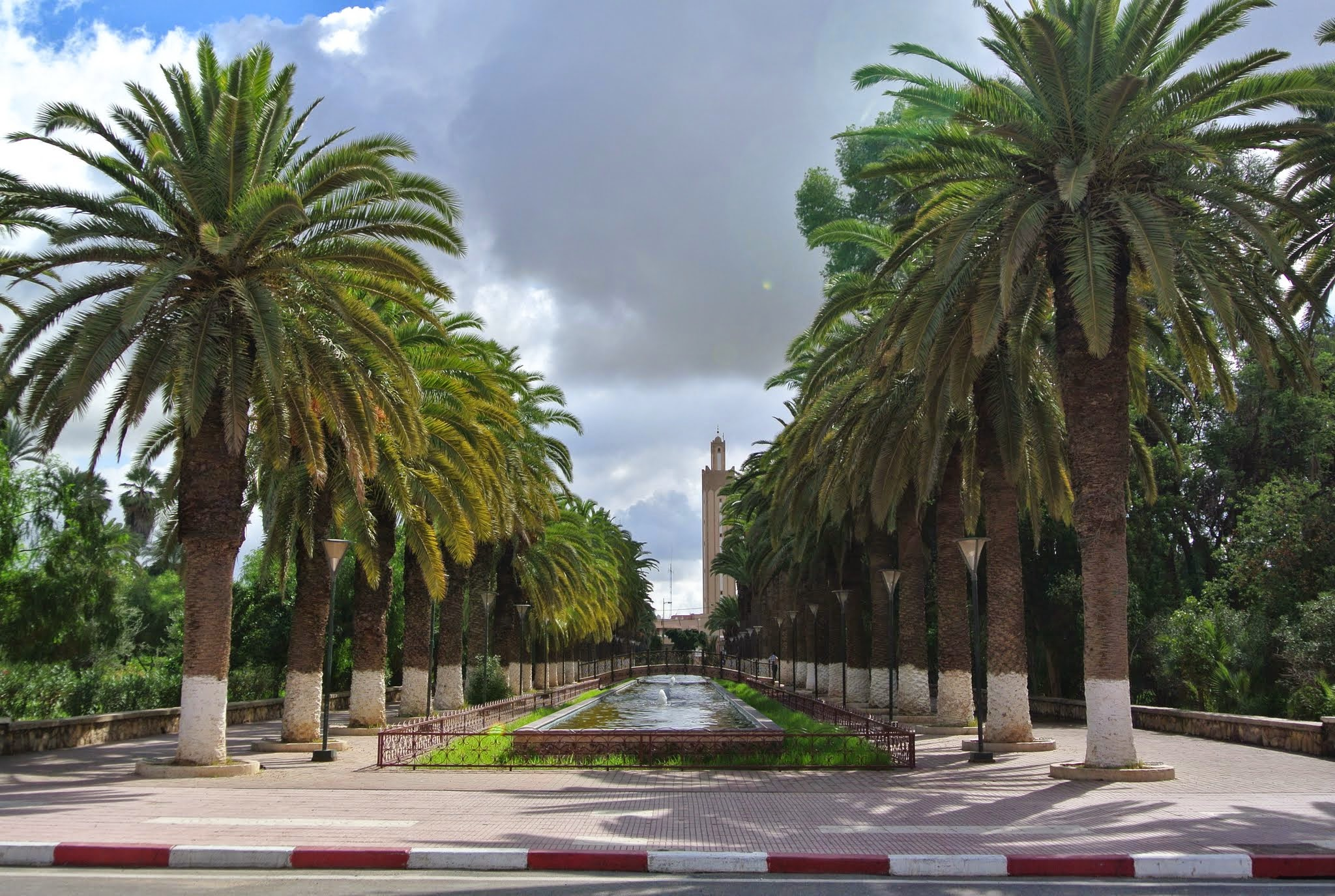
- Interactive map of Taroudant
- Coordinates: 30°28′15.59″N 8°52′50.16″W
- Country: Morocco
- Region: Souss-Massa
- Province: Taroudant

Government
  - Mayor: Abdellatif Ouahbi (PAM)
- Elevation: 238 m (781 ft)

Population (2014)
  - Total: 80,149
- Demonym: Roudani
- Time zone: UTC+0 (GMT)
- Postal code: 83000

Taroudant (Arabic: تارودانت, romanized: Tārūdānt; Standard Moroccan Tamazight: ⵜⴰⵔⵓⴷⴰⵏⵜ, romanized: Tarudant) is the capital of Taroudant Province, located in the Souss-Massa region, Morocco. It is situated east of Agadir on the road to Ouarzazate and south of Marrakesh.

It is a market city and a tourist destination.

== History ==
=== Ancient period ===
It has been speculated that Taroudant is the same town known as Vala or Uala, which existed in ancient Mauretania.

=== Medieval period ===
The city walls of the historic medina

The Almoravids occupied the city in 1056. In the mid-15th century the Banu Zaydan, the family who later founded the Saadi dynasty, established themselves near Taroudant in a settlement called Tidsi, which served briefly as the base of the dynasty's first leader, al-Qa'im, until 1513. According to Moroccan news media, the current layout of the city walls dates to the Saadi period in the 16th century.

In the 17th century, Taroudant was the base of Sidi Yahya, a local chieftain who successfully aided the Saadi sultan Moulay Zaydan against Abu Mahalli, a rebel who had captured Marrakesh.

The city underwent economic decline after the port of Agadir was closed to commerce in 1760. In the late 19th century, Sultan Hassan I established more secure control of the city. At the beginning of the 20th century, it resisted government control again until qa'id Tayyeb al-Goundafi restored order in 1903. When France began to impose its protectorate on Morocco in 1912, Ahmed al-Hiba used Taroudant as his capital to resist the French. The French only established control over it in 1917.

Historically, there was a Jewish community in Taroudant, believed to have been established in the 11th century. Jews made up 10% of the city's population, and mainly engaged in the caravan trade. Moses ben Maimon Albas was a prominent Jewish Kabbalist from Taroudant.

== Climate ==
On 11 August 2023, a maximum temperature of 48.0 °C (118.4 °F) was registered.

== Economy ==
The souk

Today, Taroudant is a notable market town with a souk near each of its two main squares, Assarag and Talmoklate. There is also a weekly souk outside the city walls, near the future university district.

== Landmarks ==
Palais Musée Claudio Bravo: Museum and the painters former home

The medina (historic quarter) of Taroudant is classified as a national cultural heritage monument of Morocco. Its historic city walls are around 6 kilometres (3.7 mi) or 8 kilometres (5.0 mi) long and are set with bastions and punctuated by nine gates that are still in use.

== Notable people ==
- Muhammad al-Rudani
- Sana Akroud (born 1980), actress, filmmaker, screenwriter, film producer
- Moses ben Maimon Albas (16th century), kabbalist
- Ahmed Soultan, singer
- Claudio Bravo, painter
