= Lahcen Zinoun =

Moroccan choreographer (1944–2024)

- لحسن زينون
- Born: Lahcen Zinoun; 14 September 1944; Hay Mohammadi, Casablanca, Morocco
- Died: 16 January 2024 (aged 79); Casablanca, Morocco
- Occupations: Choreographer, dancer, filmmaker

Lahcen Zinoun (Arabic: لحسن زينون; 14 September 1944 – 16 January 2024) was a Moroccan choreographer, modern dancer, and filmmaker. He was considered the most renowned contemporary Moroccan choreographer.

== Biography ==
Lahcen Zinoun was born on 14 September 1944, in La Cité ouvrière Socica, of Hay Mohammadi, Casablanca. His father was a Berber, who worked as a railroad worker. In 1958, Zinoun entered the Conservatory of Casablanca, where he eventually was initiated to modern dance. In 1964, he received a first prize in dance by the conservatory; but nevertheless, he was refused a scholarship to study dance abroad. When Zinoun's father found out that he was a student at the conservatory, he kicked him out of the family home. Afterwards, Zinoun went to Belgium because of his admiration of the dancer Maurice Béjart, with whom he eventually became a danseur étoile in the ballet of the Opéra royal de Wallonie.

In 1973, he decided to return to Morocco to contribute to modern dance and give it more recognition in his home country, but was met with little recognition. His return was also meant to reconcile with his father, who invited him to a wedding, and he said of this experience, "I saw my father dancing and I understood that we were united again". In 1978, with his wife Michèle Barret, also a dancer, he founded a school and a dance troupe, titled "Le Ballet-Théâtre Zinoun". He further tried to create a national troupe of traditional Moroccan dance, but the project was rejected by King Hassan II. In an interview Zinoun said, "King Hassan II called me in order to tell me that in Morocco we don’t dance. Morocco was a country of men". After all of these obstacles, he turned to other artistic endeavors, including painting, as an emotional outlet. He started dancing again in 1991, and the same year, he founded a new dance school in Casablanca, where his wife and sons taught. In 2003, he was named director of the Marrakech Festival of Popular Arts.

Starting in 1982, Zinoun created the choreography for several international and Moroccan films, and from 2001 onwards, directed his own short and feature films.

Zinoun died from a cerebral haemorrhage on 16 January 2024, at the age of 79.

== Filmography ==
Year	Title	Credited as		Notes
Year	Title	Director	Choreographer	Notes
1982	Les beaux jours de Shéhérazade	No	Yes	directed by Mostapha Derkaoui
1988	The Last Temptation of Christ	No	Yes	directed by Martin Scorsese
1990	The Sheltering Sky	No	Yes	directed by Bernardo Bertolucci
1995	Joseph	No	Yes	directed by Roger Young
1996	L'ombre du pharaon	No	Yes	directed by Souheil Ben-Barka
1998	Femmes... et femmes	No	Yes	directed by Saâd Chraïbi
2001	Assamt	Yes	No	short film
2002	Piano	Yes	No	short film
2003	Faux pas	Yes	No	short film
2007	Oud l'ward ou la beauté éparpillée	Yes	No	first feature film Co-written with Hicham Lasri and Fatima Loukili
2011	Femme écrite	Yes	No	second feature film

== Honours ==
- Knight of the Order of Leopold, 11 September 2003

== See also ==
- List of dancers
