= Claudio Bravo (painter) =

Chilean hyperrealist painter

- Born: Claudio Nelson Bravo Camus; November 8, 1936; Valparaíso, Chile
- Died: June 4, 2011 (aged 74); Taroudant, Morocco
- Education: Colegio San Ignacio (Santiago de Chile) and Miguel Venegas Cifuentes' studio
- Known for: Painting
- Movement: Hyperrealism
- Awards: Hall of Fame Honoree (from The Pastel Society of America, New York in 1996); Gran Cruz de Alfonso X El Sabio (from Alfonso X El Sabio, Madrid, Spain in 2000); International Distinguished Artist Award (from Art Miami, Miami, Florida in 2000); Gold Medal of Honor (from Casita Maria, Bronx, New York in 2005)

Claudio Nelson Bravo Camus (November 8, 1936 – June 4, 2011) was a Chilean hyperrealist painter. He was greatly influenced by Renaissance and Baroque artists, as well as Surrealist painters such as Salvador Dalí. He lived and worked in Tangier, Morocco, beginning in 1972. Bravo also lived in Chile, New York City and Spain. He was known mainly for his paintings of still lifes, portraits and packages, but he had also done drawings, lithographs, engraving and figural bronze sculptures. Bravo painted many prominent figures in society, including caudillo Franco of Spain, President Ferdinand Marcos and First Lady Imelda Marcos of the Philippines and Malcolm Forbes.

The Baltimore Museum of Art, El Museo del Barrio (New York City), the Honolulu Museum of Art, the Metropolitan Museum of Art, Museo Nacional de Bellas Artes (Santiago, Chile), Museo Rufino Tamayo (Mexico City), Museum Boijmans Van Beuningen (Rotterdam, Netherlands), the Museum of Fine Arts, Boston, the Museum of Modern Art (New York City), Museum Ludwig (Cologne, Germany), the Palmer Museum of Art (Pennsylvania State University), and the Philadelphia Museum of Art are among the public collections holding works by Bravo.

== Early life and education in Chile ==
Bravo was born in Valparaíso, Chile, to Tomás Bravo Santibáñez and Laura Camus Gómez. His father was a successful businessman who also owned a ranch, and his mother was a housewife. They had seven children: María Inés, Claudio Bravo, Patricia, Ana María, José Tomás, Hernán, and Ximena. One of his earliest childhood memories was being put on a horse at the age of three.

In 1945, he left the family ranch to join the Colegio San Ignacio in Santiago, Chile, where he excelled in choir, literature and music. In order to raise his grades in math, physics or chemistry, he would give his teacher a portrait. The prefect, Father Dussuel, noticed his self-taught artistic ability and paid for him to study art in the studio of Miguel Venegas Cifuentes in Santiago. Eventually, Bravo's father granted him permission to take the classes and took over the responsibility of paying for them. Bravo studied under Venegas from the age of 11 to 20 and it was the only formal art training he ever received. Bravo's developing hyperrealist style was encouraged by Venegas who was known for being a strong supporter of the realist movement in Chile. Chile has a strong tie to European arts and did not experience a large modernist movement that other Latin American countries did.

In 1954, he had his first exhibition at "Salón 13" in Santiago at the age of 17. It consisted of mostly oil paintings with some red chalk drawings. The exhibit received good reviews and was considered a great success. All the works were sold, although they went to family and friends. He became very involved in the cultural scene of Santiago and was influenced by people such as Luis Oyarzun, a poet and philosopher. Bravo and Oyarzun hitchhiked together throughout Chile with Oyarzun acting as a teacher of philosophy, art, and life. Benjamín Subercaseaux was another friend who encouraged Bravo to expand his knowledge through reading. In 1955, he danced professionally with the Compañía de Ballet de Chile and worked for Teatro de Ensayo of the Universidad Católica de Chile and had his second exhibition at "Salón 13".

== Madrid, Spain ==
=== Portraitures ===
At 21, Bravo began doing portraits in Concepción, Chile, and quickly gained many commissions. He saved his earnings and bought a ticket aboard the Amerigo Vespucci to sail to Paris. The trip, however, was very stormy and Bravo got off at Barcelona and made his way to Madrid where he stayed. Bravo established himself in Madrid in the 1960s as a society portraitist, gaining recognition for his astounding ability to create verisimilitude. His ability to depict complex objects and shapes is reminiscent of Velázquez. There was even a dress designer, Balenciaga, whose dresses had a Renaissance quality to them. Bravo made women of nobility purchase one of Balenciaga's works before he agreed to do their portrait. A year and two months after his arrival, he was already painting Francisco Franco's daughter.

His interest in Renaissance and Baroque works came from his many visits to the Museo del Prado in Madrid where he admired paintings done by old Spanish and Italian masters. Specifically he was inspired by Diego Velázquez for his light effects, Francisco de Zurbarán’s cloth studies, Juan Sánchez Cotán’s still lifes, Juan van der Hamen who popularized still life painting in Madrid, and Luis Egidio Meléndez who had great technical skill in using light to depict texture.

In 1968, Bravo received an invitation from President Marcos of the Philippines to come and paint him and his wife, Imelda Marcos, as well as members of the high society. He spent six months there doing portraits and traveling. Bravo found that the quality of light there was more intense than in Spain or Chile and it transformed how he painted while there. He held an exhibit at the Luz Gallery in Manila where he displayed over 50 works.

=== Package paintings ===
With Spain under Franco’s rule, most art was constrained to his ultra right-wing policies. Bravo’s portraits appealed to the conservative public, but he became frustrated with the lack of intellectual values concerning art. His art shifted one day when his three visiting sisters brought home some packages and left them on the table. He was fascinated by their forms and the texture of the paper they were wrapped with. Bravo’s first exhibit in Spain, at the Galería Fortuny in 1963, had all types of paintings, including these new package ones.

White and Yellow Package, painted in 2005, is a good example of Bravo's continuation of the parcel series. One of the first things to catch the eye is his use of trompe-l'œil, a technique from the Baroque period meaning "to deceive the eye", used to create the illusion of three-dimensionality. This painting style is similar to his approach to still lifes and helps to emphasize the tactile qualities of the paper. The way the package fills the frame elevates its status in a similar manner to what Pop art was doing in the 60s when he began. It also abstracts the package, almost breaking it into clean color blocks, if it weren't for the string keeping it contained. This abstraction is similar to Rothko’s paintings that employ fields of color and encourage almost a meditative state.

While similar to modern movements, White and Yellow Package also mimics the old masters and their use of draping cloth. Bravo's use of light is similar to that of Caravaggio, an Italian Baroque painter who used a dramatic lighting style called tenebrism to highlight a climactic moment and to bring attention to the front plane by concealing the background in darkness. Many of Caravaggio's works were spiritual and Bravo's Catholic upbringing left him with interest in themes of ritual, mystery, spirituality, death, and the idea of saints. This connection is made obvious through the title of one of his pieces, Homage to St. Theresa, also oil on canvas painted in 1969. A subtle reference to commercialism lingers in the simple fact that it is a parcel, but the mystery of what the paper conceals seems to be more important. The package is teasing the viewer by slowly opening up and while the internal structure is hinted at, it will never be revealed. In this painting, the act of teasing also becomes sexual, reinforced by the color scheme that resembles an egg - a symbol for rebirth and fertility. Overall, White and Yellow Package showcases his ability as a painter and is a mix of contemporary imagery done with traditional values.

== New York ==
In 1969, Bravo met Melvin Blake and Frank Purnell who were in Spain collecting art – especially figure and surrealist pieces. They encouraged him to move to the United States and helped him get connected to the art scene. He moved into an apartment in the East Side of Manhattan. In 1970, Bravo had his first exhibition at the Staempfli Gallery in New York, receiving rave reviews from renowned New York Times art critic John Canaday. Years later, when Bravo's work reflected the hippie movement, Canaday would refer to Bravo's work as "cheap and vulgar".

== Morocco ==
Bravo's relationship with the New York art scene stayed strong, but he began to feel the gray cement and urban setting affecting his work. That, paired with the active social demands in both New York and Spain, caused him to start looking for a new place where he could dedicate more of his time to painting. Not wanting to cut himself off completely from his friends in Madrid, Bravo decided to spend some time in Morocco. The fact that was a completely different place in almost every aspect of life (religion, language, clothing, etc.) was intriguing to him. Bravo moved to Tangier in 1972, where he purchased a 19th-century three-story mansion. He had many of the walls removed, and the remaining walls were painted white to encourage the Mediterranean light so present in his paintings.

He hadn't intended on staying in Morocco, but it was there that he found the colors and light he had been searching for. Bravo considered what he was able to paint "...symphonies of color." Morocco quickly became the place that he considered to be home and with his gardens and view, Bravo rarely needed to leave his house. However, in an attempt to reconnect with the Moroccan world around him, he bought a second home in Marrakesh that became his winter residence. Later, Bravo built a third home north of Taroudant. Though Bravo's style is hyper-realistic in nature, he rejected the assumption that he based his work on photographic imagery. Instead, Bravo had a daily ritual of painting that began with a walk in the garden and ended after he spent hours in his studio painting a present subject. He took his dedication to painting very seriously and tried to paint every day.

Still lifes, packages and figurative paintings make up the majority of these works created in Morocco. While these all have connections to his previous work, they became infused with Moroccan culture. His use of Surrealism becomes more prominent as well, noticeable in his juxtaposition of objects, dreamlike compositions and ethereal backgrounds. Bravo became interested in the spiritual aspects of the Islamic culture that had a sense of religious intensity that matched his preoccupation with mystery and spirituality. Many view his works as being a hybrid of multiple religions and styles - traditional techniques with contemporary sensibilities, Biblical saints displaced in a Moroccan world, and exotic objects next to common Western imagery. This is supported by the fact that despite his interest in his surroundings, Bravo rejected the label of Orientalist because he did not consider himself to be a part of any particular culture but rather a man interested in many. Though he was fascinated by the Arab world around him, his use of exotic objects and imagery was not done as an attempt to merge his work with the culture.

== Death and legacy ==
Bravo died at his home in Taroudant, Morocco, on June 4, 2011, after the second of two heart attacks.

On 8 November 2019, Google celebrated his 83rd birthday with a Google Doodle.

== Personal life ==
Bravo was celibate for the last 2 decades of his life. In an interview for El Mercurio he stated, "That (romantic love) was very complicated for me...I’m too passionate and jealous. I decided that my paintings and my animals were my best sources of love. I don’t think I’ve had anyone in my bed since I was 50. I got tired of it."

Bravo was assisted by Bachir Tabchich who was first hired as chauffeur but later relocated to Bravo's residence with his wife and children and worked as Bravo's assistant since 1979. Tabchich currently permits tours at Palais Claudio Bravo which is 10 kilometers north of Taroudant.

== Public collections ==
- Archer M. Huntington Gallery of Art, University of Texas (Austin, Texas)
- Art Museum, Florida International University (Miami, Florida)
- Art Museum, Princeton University (Princeton, New Jersey)
- Ateneum Art Museum (Helsinki, Finland)
- Baltimore Museum of Art (Baltimore, Maryland)
- Doane College Museum (Crete, Nebraska)
- Gibbes Museum of Art (Charleston, South Carolina)
- Indiana University Art Museum (Bloomington, Indiana)
- Kansas City Art Institute (Kansas City, Missouri)
- Kemper Museum of Contemporary Art (Kansas City, Missouri)
- Mitter Heinisches Landesmuseum (Mainz, Germany)
- Museo de Arte Abstracto (Cuenca, Spain)
- Museo de Arte de Ponce (Ponce, Puerto Rico)
- Colección D.O.P. (Paris, France)
- Museo de Artes Visuales, Colección Santa Cruz-Yaconi (Santiago, Chile)
- Museo Nacional de Bellas Artes (Santiago, Chile)
- Museum Boymans-van Beuningen (Rotterdam, Netherlands)
- Museum of Art, University of Pennsylvania (Philadelphia, Pennsylvania)
- Museum of Fine Arts (Boston, Massachusetts)
- Museum Ludwig (Cologne, Germany)
- Philadelphia Museum of Art (Philadelphia, Pennsylvania)
- Rufino Tamayo Museum of International Contemporary Art (Mexico City, Mexico)
- The Frances Lehman Loeb Art Center, Vassar College (Poughkeepsie, New York)
- The Metropolitan Museum and Arts Center (Miami, Florida)
- Fundación D.O.P. (Madrid, Spain)
- The Metropolitan Museum of Art (New York, New York)
- The Museum of Modern Art (New York, New York)

== General references ==
- Claudio Bravo
- Bravo, Claudio
- Claudio Bravo exalta lo mejor de la Tradición Pictórica
