= Samuel Albas =

18th C. rabbi in Fes, Morocco

Samuel Albas (1697 – 1749) was a rabbi in Fes, Morocco. He was well read in the Talmud and in rabbinical literature, and was highly esteemed by Hayyim ibn Atar and others of his contemporaries. He composed novellas on the treatise 'Abodah Zarah of the Babylonian Talmud, which still exist in manuscript.
