= L'enfant Cheikh =

- Directed by: Hamid Bénani
- Written by: Hamid Bénani
- Produced by: Le rameau d’or
- Starring: Omar Lotfi, Sanaa Mouziane, Farah Fassi
- Cinematography: Kamal Derkaoui
- Edited by: Siham Idrissi
- Release date: 2012
- Running time: 80 minutes
- Country: Morocco
- Language: Moroccan Arabic

L'enfant Cheikh (English: The Cheikh Child) is a 2012 film directed by Hamid Bénani.

== Synopsis ==
Said, an old blind man, tells his adopted son about his participance in the resistance to colonial penetration in Tafilalet.

== Cast ==
- Omar Lotfi
- Sanaa Mouziane
- Farah Fassi
- Mohamed Majd
- Driss Roukhe
- Mohamed Bastaoui
