= Fissures (film) =

- Directed by: Hicham Ayouch
- Screenplay by: Hicham Ayouch
- Produced by: Videorama
- Starring: Abdelsellem Bounouacha Marcela Moura Noureddine Denoul Mohamed Aouragh
- Cinematography: Hicham Ayouch
- Edited by: Franck Pairaud Khaled Salem
- Music by: Hicham Ayouch
- Release date: 2009
- Running time: 75 minutes
- Country: Morocco

Fissures is a 2009 Moroccan film directed by Hicham Ayouch.

== Synopsis ==
In the city of Tangier three people on the margins of society looking for love and deliverance will come together and find love with one another: Abdelsellem, a man who breaks out of prison, Noureddine, his best friend, and Marcela, a Brazilian fantasist, excessive and suicidal.

== Response ==
The film received critical acclaim in France.
