= Selma Bargach =

Moroccan filmmaker

- Born: Casablanca
- Citizenship: Moroccan
- Education: Sorbonne
- Occupation: Filmmaker
- Notable work: Jamais plus (fiction, 10’)

Selma Bargach is a Moroccan filmmaker.

== Biography ==
Born in Casablanca, Bargach studied art and cinema, notably at the Sorbonne in Paris. She obtained her doctorate with a thesis on the status and role of women in Moroccan cinema, under the direction of Daniel Serceau. She directed her first short films in super 8 film. Upon returning to Morocco, she worked as an assistant director and became the audiovisual manager at the ONA Group. She continued to direct short films.

Her first feature film, The Fifth String, released in 2011, is dedicated to the journey of a young lute musician. It won the prize for Best Sound and a special mention from the jury at the Tangier National Film Festival. It also won awards at other festivals, including the Khouribga Film Festival, and was selected for the Kicheon Music Film Festival in South Korea, the Fameck Arab Film Festival, the Brussels Arab Film Festival and the Cinéalma Film Festival in Carros, France.

Hersecond feature film, Indigo, also won several awards. In particular, it received the Paulin Soumanon Vieyra African Critics' Award at the Pan-African Film and Television Festival of Ouagadougou (FESPACO), the Best African Film Award at the 5th edition of the Mashariki African Film Festival of Kigali, as well as the Best Female Role Award at the 21st edition of the African Film Festival of Khouribga. It tells the story of a 13 year old girl, Nora, who feels abandoned, and who takes refuge in the world of clairvoyance to escape the brutality of her brother.

== Partial filmography ==
=== Short films ===
- 2004 : Jamais plus (fiction, 10’)
- 2005 : L’ascenseur (fiction, 23’)

=== Feature films ===
- 2011 : The Fifth String (La cinquième corde)
- 2018 : Indigo
