= Bouchra Hraich =

Moroccan actress and comedian

- Born: 27 July 1972 (age 54); Salé
- Education: Institut supérieur d'art dramatique et d'animation culturelle (ISADAC)
- Occupation: Actress . comedian

Bouchra Hraich (also spelled "Ahrich"; born 27 July 1972 in Salé) is a Moroccan actress and comedian.

== Biography ==
Hraich was born in Salé. After graduating from high school, she enrolled at the Institut supérieur d'art dramatique et d'animation culturelle (ISADAC) in Rabat, where she spent four years studying stage acting.

== Partial filmography ==
=== Feature films ===
- 2004: Tarfaya
- 2008: Ex-Chemkar
- 2011: Larbi ou le destin d'un grand footballeur
- 2015: La Isla de Perejil
- 2018: Corsa

=== Short films ===
- 2003: Balcon Atlantico
