= Olivier Barlet =

French journalist, translator, film critic and researcher

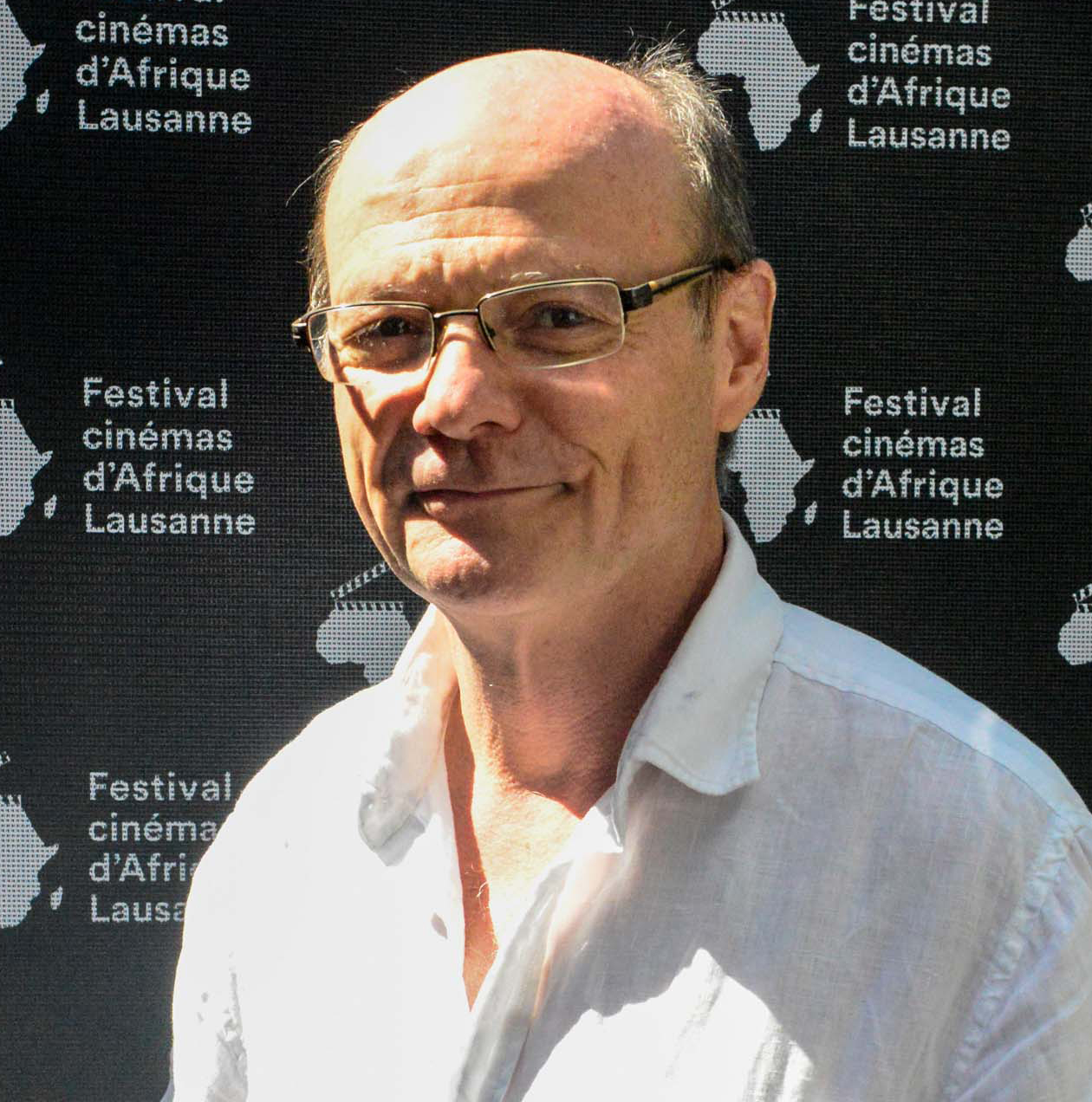
- Born: France
- Occupations: Journalist, critic, historian of cinema
- Notable work: African Cinemas: Decolonizing the Gaze; Contemporary African Cinema

Olivier Barlet is a French journalist, translator, film critic, and researcher on African cinema and its diasporas. He is known as founding editor-in-chief of the magazine and website Africultures, and is regarded as a leading French and European expert on African cinema.

== Early life and education ==
Olivier Barlet was born in Paris, France. graduated in 1976 from ESCP-EAP (alternative Studies in Paris, London and Düsseldorf).

== Career ==
Initially a rural animator for the DECOR Association, Barlet taught translation and interpreting in Munich from 1985 to 1990, then became a literary agent and translated many books on Africa and African authors from German and English (see Selected works).

From 1992 to 2018, together with Sylvie Chalaye, he directed the collection Images plurielles (cinema and theatre) at Editions L'Harmattan in Paris.

Published in 1996, Les Cinemas d'Afrique noire: le regard en question, won the 1997 Prix Art et Essai from the Centre national de la cinématographie. By its title, it suggests abandoning the expression "African cinema", which it considers to confine these plural cinematographies to a genre.

A member of the Syndicat français de la critique de cinéma, he wrote about cinema in the monthly magazines Africa International, Afrique-Asie, and Continental, as well as in the Lettre des musiques et des arts Africans. In November 1997 he co-founded, with a few colleagues, the magazine Africultures. He was editor-in-chief from 1997 to 2004, publishing nearly 1800 articles on African cinema. He also wrote the cinema pages of the magazine Afriscope (2007-2017).

Barlet was president of the Africultures association from 1997 to 2008 and then treasurer until 2016, before turning over to a younger team while remaining director of publications. As president or editor-in-chief, he has intervened in the public debate, notably on human zoos, the commemoration of the abolition of slavery, the intellectual movement, and immigration issues.

He participated in the creation of the African Federation of Film Critics in Tunis in 2004, and was its treasurer until 2009. He has also conducted dozens of workshops on criticism for journalists in various African countries.

Since its creation in 2002, he has participated in the programming and animation of the Festival des cinémas d'Afrique du pays d'Apt. He is also a programmer for the creative documentary platform Tënk.

In 2012, Barlet published Les Cinemas d'Afrique des années 2000: perspectives critiques, proposing to "rethink the critical discourse on African cinema", and to "formulate new bases for the criticism of African cinema". According to Pierre Barrot, he analyses "three major trends of the past decade: the breakthrough of filmmakers with an immigrant background, the retreat of historical taboos and the affirmation of women".

As of 2021 Barlet continues to publish reviews, analyses, and interviews on africultures.com website, often translated into English in the American magazine Black Camera, as well as in numerous international magazines and books. He also publishes analyses of African films together with academics and critics on the website afrimages.net.

== Recognition and awards ==
Critic Jean-Michel Frodon described Barlet as a leading French and European expert on African cinema.

At the 2023 Cannes Film Festival, he received the Achievement Award for Film Critics awarded by the Arab Cinema Center.

At the Dakar Court Festival in 2025, he received an Achievement Award for Film Critics.

== Selected works ==
=== Books ===
- Les Cinémas d'Afrique noire: le regard en question, Paris: L'Harmattan, 1996, translated to English under the title: African cinemas: decolonizing the gaze, London: Zed Books, 2000, and in German: Afrikanische Kinowelten: die Dekolonisierung des Blicks, Horlemann/Arte, 2001, as well as in Italian: Il Cinema africano: lo sguardo in questione, L'Harmattan Italia/COE, 1998.
- Les Cinémas d'Afrique des années 2000: perspectives critiques, Paris: L'Harmattan, 2012. Translated to English under the title: Contemporary African cinema, East Lansing: Michigan State University Press, 2016, and in Arab published by the Luxor African Film Festival (Egypt, 2019), as well as in Spanish: Cine africano contemporáneo - Perspectivas críticas, Catarata ediciones, Madrid, 2021.

=== French translations ===
- Kariuki, aventures avec le petit homme blanc de Meja Mwangi, L'Harmattan 1992, translated from English: Adventures with Little White Man, Lamuv 1991.
- (with Simon Baguma Mweze) Les Enfants du faiseur de pluie d'Aniceti Kitereza, 1996 and Le Tueur de serpents, L'Harmattan/UNESCO 1999, translated from Swahili Bwana Myombekere na Bibi Bugonoka na Ntulanalwo na Bulihwali, Tanzania Publishing House, 1980.
- Le Corps à corps de Buchi Emecheta, L'Harmattan/UNESCO 1999, translated from English: The Wrestling Match, Oxford University Press 1980.
- Pourquoi le Tiers-monde ? Manuel à l'usage des jeunes générations' by Barbara Veot, Hans-Otto Wiebus, L'Harmattan 1990, translated from German: Das Dritte Welt Buch für Kinder, Ravensburger 1988.
- Au plus profond de l’Afrique – le Rwanda et la colonisation allemande by Gudrun Honke, Peter Hammer Verlag, Wuppertal 1990 (in French), translated from German: Rwanda und die Deutschen.
- La Musique africaine contemporaine, Sweet Mother, by Wolfgang Bender, L’Harmattan 1992, translated from German: Sweet Mother, Moderne Afrikanische Musik, Trickster Verlag 1985.
- L'Art contemporain dans les pays du "tiers monde" by Jutta Ströter-Bender, L'Harmattan 1995, translated from German: Zeitgenössische Kunst der "Dritten Welt", DuMont 1991.
- La guerre des esprits en Ouganda, 1985-1996 : le mouvement du Saint-Esprit d’Alice Lakwena, by Heike Behrend, L’Harmattan 1997, translated from German: Alice und die Geister, Trickster Verlag, 1993 .
