= Hicham Lasri =

Moroccan film director

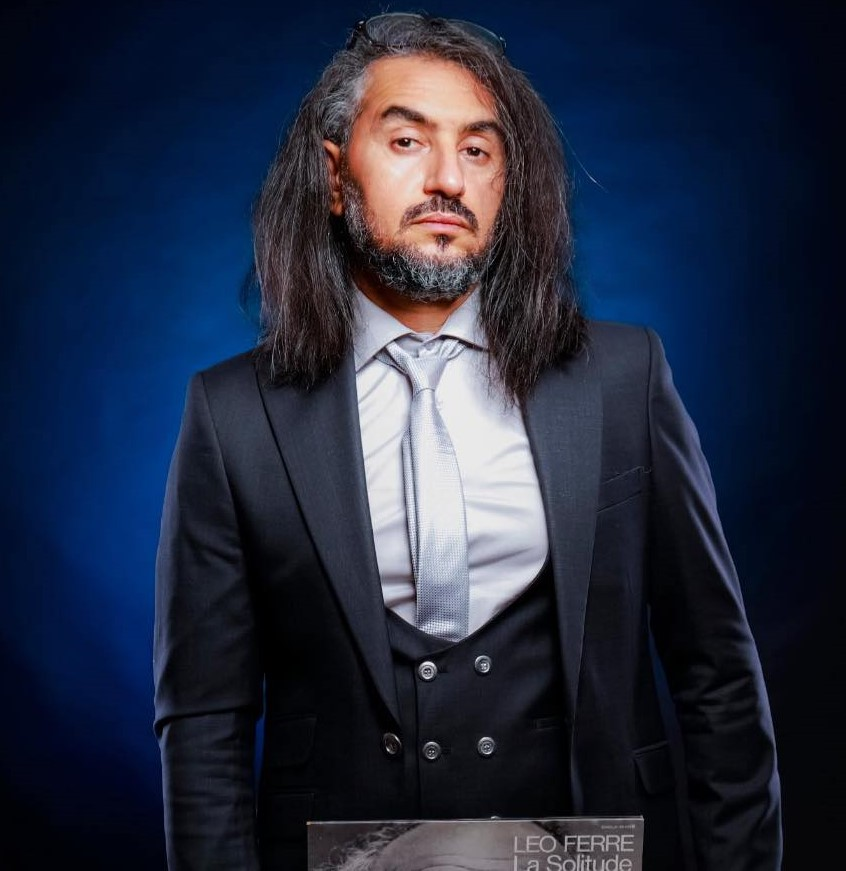
- Born: April 13, 1977 (age 49); Casablanca, Morocco
- Occupations: Film director; producer; screenwriter; comics artist

Hicham Lasri (Arabic: هشام العسري; born April 13, 1977) is a Moroccan comics artist, film director, novelist, producer and screenwriter. He has a special imprint on Moroccan cinema, as his films often deal with topics that are considered taboo in Moroccan society with great boldness.

== Biography ==
Lasri was born on April 13, 1977, in Casablanca. He grew up in a family of five brothers and a sister. After obtaining a law degree, he changed orientation and began a career of the playwright. He was a student of the screenwriter Emmanuelle Sardou and the filmmaker Hassan Leghzouli. Then he did an internship supervised by Sylvie Bailly, which allowed him to deepen his training on Sitcoms.

== Career ==
He became the protégé of Nabil Ayouch and wrote his first screenplay in 2002 for one of his films, La légende d'Arhaz, while also being the screenwriter of Lahcen Zinoun for La beauté éparpillée (2006).

From 2004 to 2006, he worked as director of writing in Nabil Ayouch's company, Ali n’prod, he remained so between April 2006 and June 2007, for the "Film Industry" project. He worked also as an artistic director and took the opportunity to direct Le peuple de l’horloge, an 81-minute fiction.

In 2010, he co-produced Terminus des anges with Narjiss Nejjar and Mohamed Mouftakir. His first solo feature film was The end, produced by Lamia Chraibi and her company La Prod.

In his second movie, C'est eux les chiens... (2013), he made the parallel between the Moroccan riots of 1981 and the February 20 Movement. All in the form of a rather nervous docufiction. After being selected at ACID in Cannes, the film was screened at 32 other international festivals between 2013 and 2015, including FESPACO, Malmo and the Carthage Film Festival. Lasri's other films were also selected four times at the Berlinale between 2014 and 2018.

His first Documentary, Nayda?, looks back at the 2000s Moroccan "Nayda" movement, likened to the Spanish Movida.

== Personal life ==
In December 2023, alongside 50 other filmmakers, Lasri signed an open letter published in Libération demanding a ceasefire and an end to the killing of civilians amid the 2023 Israeli invasion of the Gaza Strip, and for a humanitarian corridor into Gaza to be established for humanitarian aid, and the release of hostages.

== Works ==
=== Filmography ===
==== Films ====
Year	Title	Credited as				Notes
Year	Title	Director	Screenwriter	Producer	Cinematographer	Notes
2002	Géométrie Du Remords	Yes	Yes	No	No	Short film
2003	Rahma	No	Yes	No	No	directed by Driss Chraïbi
2004	Ali J'nah Freestyle	Yes	Yes	No	No	short film, produced by Nabil Ayouch
2005	Lunati(K)a	Yes	Yes	No	No	short film
2005	Jardin des Rides	Yes	Yes	No	No	short film
2006	Heart Edges	No	Yes	No	No	Directed by Hicham Ayouch; Co-writer with Hicham Ayouch
2007	Tissée de mains et d'étoffe	No	Yes	No	No	Directed by Omar Chraïbi
2007	La beauté éparpillée	No	Yes	No	No	Directed by Lahcen Zinoun; Co-writer with Lahcen Zinoun and Fatima Loukili
2010	Terminus des anges	Yes	Yes	No	No	Co-director with Narjiss Nejjar and Mohamed Mouftakir; Co-writer with Narjiss Nejjar, Mohamed Mouftakir and Mehdi Ben Attia
2011	The End	Yes	Yes	No	No	First feature film
2011	Android	Yes	Yes	No	Yes	Short video
2013	C'est eux les chiens...	Yes	Yes	No	No	
2013	Ymma	No	Yes	No	No	Directed and produced by Rachid El Ouali
2014	The Sea Is Behind	Yes	Yes	Yes	No	Co-producer with Lamia Chraibi
2015	Starve Your Dog	Yes	Yes	Yes	No	
2017	Headbang Lullaby	Yes	No	No	No	
2018	Jahilya	Yes	Yes	Yes	No	
2018	Yto	No	Yes	No	No	Directed by Noureddine Ayouch
2019	Love in Aleppo	Yes	Yes	No	No	Short film
2019	Nayda?	Yes	Yes	No	No	Documentary film
2023	Coup de tampon	No	Yes	No	No	Directed by Rachid El Ouali Co-writer with Rachid El Ouali
2023	Moroccan Badass Girl	Yes	Yes	Yes	No	Co-producer with Achraf Saad
2026	Thank You Satan	Yes	Yes	No	No	Produced by Lamia Chraibi

==== Television ====
Year	Title	Role	Notes
2006	Tiwarga	Art director	Television film
2007	L'os de fer	Director, writer	Television film
2008	TiphinaR	Director, writer	Television film
2008	Houti Houta	Art director	Television film
2009	Le peuple de l’horloge	Director, writer	Television film
2009	la famille marche à l’ombre	Director, writer	Television film Co-Writer with Youssef Karami
2016	Nhar Zwine	Director, writer	Television film
2017	Moul Al-Ihsa	Director	Television film
2018	Fok Sehhab	Director, writer	Television series
2019	Hami Wlad Aami	Director	Television series
2022	Lotfi Nhila	Director, writer	Television miniseries Co-Director with Hamza Atifi

==== Web series ====
Year	Title	Notes
June 2016	No Vaseline Fatwa	33 episodes
July 2016	Khal Rass (les basanés)	6 episodes
November 2016	Bissara Overdose	7 episodes
December 2016	Caca-Mind	5 episodes

=== Novels ===
- Stati©: roman à facettes. Eddif. 2009. ISBN 978-9954-1-0261-9.
- Sainte Rita. Le Fennec. 2015. ISBN 978-9954-1-6772-4.
- L'improbable fable de lady bobblehead. Les Éditions Rimal. 2020. ISBN 978-9920-9973-1-7.
- L'effet Lucifer. Editions Onze. 2021. ISBN 978-9920-9107-2-9.
- Big Data Djihad: comment j'ai détruit internet et sauvé le monde. Outsiders. 2022. ISBN 978-9920-30-631-7.
- Punk Fitna. Outsiders. 2024. ISBN 9789920569231.
- Lénine, Réveille-toi, ils sont devenus ouf!. Outsiders. 2024. ISBN 9789920569293.
- Cloud cowboys. Edern éditions. 2025. ISBN 978-2-39075-138-0.

=== Graphic novels ===
- Vaudou. Editions Le Fennec. 2015. ISBN 978-9954-1-6802-8.
- Fawda. Kulte. 2017. ISBN 978-9954-9-6053-0.
- MaRRoc: faux guide touristique à l'usage des étrangers (interdit aux marocain-e-s). Editions Le Fennec. 2018. ISBN 978-9920-755-14-6.
