= Latefa Ahrar =

Moroccan actress (born 1971)

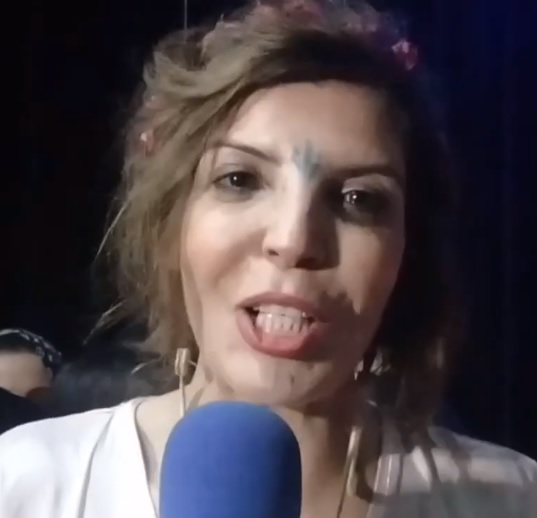
- Born: November 12, 1971 (age 54); Meknes
- Education: Institut supérieur d›art dramatique et d’animation culturelle (ISADAC)
- Occupation: Actress
- Years active: 1991-present

Latefa Ahrar (born 12 November 1971) is a Moroccan actress. On 8 December 2022, she was appointed director of the High Institute of Theatrical Arts and Cultural Animation in Rabat, Morocco.

== Biography ==
Ahrar was born in Meknes. She began her television career with Bent Lafchouch (spoiled girl) by Abdelatif Ayachi in 1990. Afterwards, she enrolled at the Institut supérieur d›art dramatique et d’animation culturelle (ISADAC) where she graduated in 1995. Since then, she has performed on the stage and screen and received numerous awards for her performances. Ahrar stated that she preferred difficult roles, and enjoyed working with different directors to expand her artistic sphere.

From 2005 to 2008, Ahrar took part in a tour at the Institut du monde arabe in Paris, with the play La dernière nuit. In 2008, she performed in two films, Une famille empruntée and Les victimes. The first was a comedic role where she played Mouna Fettou's girlfriend, while the second is as a housewife with three children who works as a seamstress.

In 2009, she performed in Eduardo De Filippo's play Douleur sous clé, adapted in Moroccan Darija by Abdellatif Firdaous, directed by Karim Troussi and performed with Hicham Ibrahimi and Henri Thomas of the Compagnie du Jour.

Her play “Kafar Naoum” sparked controversy because she wore a bikini during the performance. She received death threats for the act. Ahrar is also a theatre professor.

== Filmography ==
- 2006 : Les dix commandements : Tribes Woman #3
- 2008 : Les Hirondelles... Les Cris de jeunes filles des hirondelles
- 2008 : Une famille empruntée
- 2008 : Les victimes
- 2011 : Taza : Meryem
- 2014 : Black Screen (short film)
- 2014 : Safae Lkbira: La Grande Safae (short film)
- 2015 : Aida
- 2015 : Starve Your Dog : Rita
- 2017 : Headbang Lullaby : Rita
