= Narjiss Nejjar =

Moroccan filmmaker and screenwriter (born 1971)

- Born: 1971 (age 54–55); Tangiers, Morocco
- Occupations: Director, screenwriter
- Notable work: Wake Up Morocco

Narjiss Nejjar (born 1971) is a Moroccan filmmaker and screenwriter. Her film Les Yeux Secs (Cry No More) (Note: Sometimes translated as Dry Eyes.) was screened at Cannes in 2003.

== Early life and career ==
Nejjar was a student at ESRA in Paris, where she studied filmmaking.

In 1994, she directed her first documentary L’exigence de la Dignite. She has worked on documentaries as well as fiction films; her best known feature film, Les Yeux Secs initially started as a documentary about the women of Tizi but the women declined to be filmed. The film was screened at the 2003 Cannes film festival and the 4th International Festival of Rabat Film where she received the grand prize.

She is also the author of the novel Cahier d'empreintes; released in 1999.

Nejjar is the daughter to the novelist Noufissa Sbai; Sbai was the producer on Les Yeux Secs.

== Selected filmography ==
- L’exigence de la Dignite (1994)
- Khaddouj, Memoire de Targha (1996)
- Les Salines (1998)
- Le septième ciel (2001)
- Le miroir du fou (2002)
- Les yeux secs (Cry No More, 2003)
- Wake Up Morocco (2006)
- Terminus des anges (2010)
- L'amante du rif (2011)

== See also ==
- Cinema of Morocco
- Doha Moustaquim
