= Cinema of Morocco =

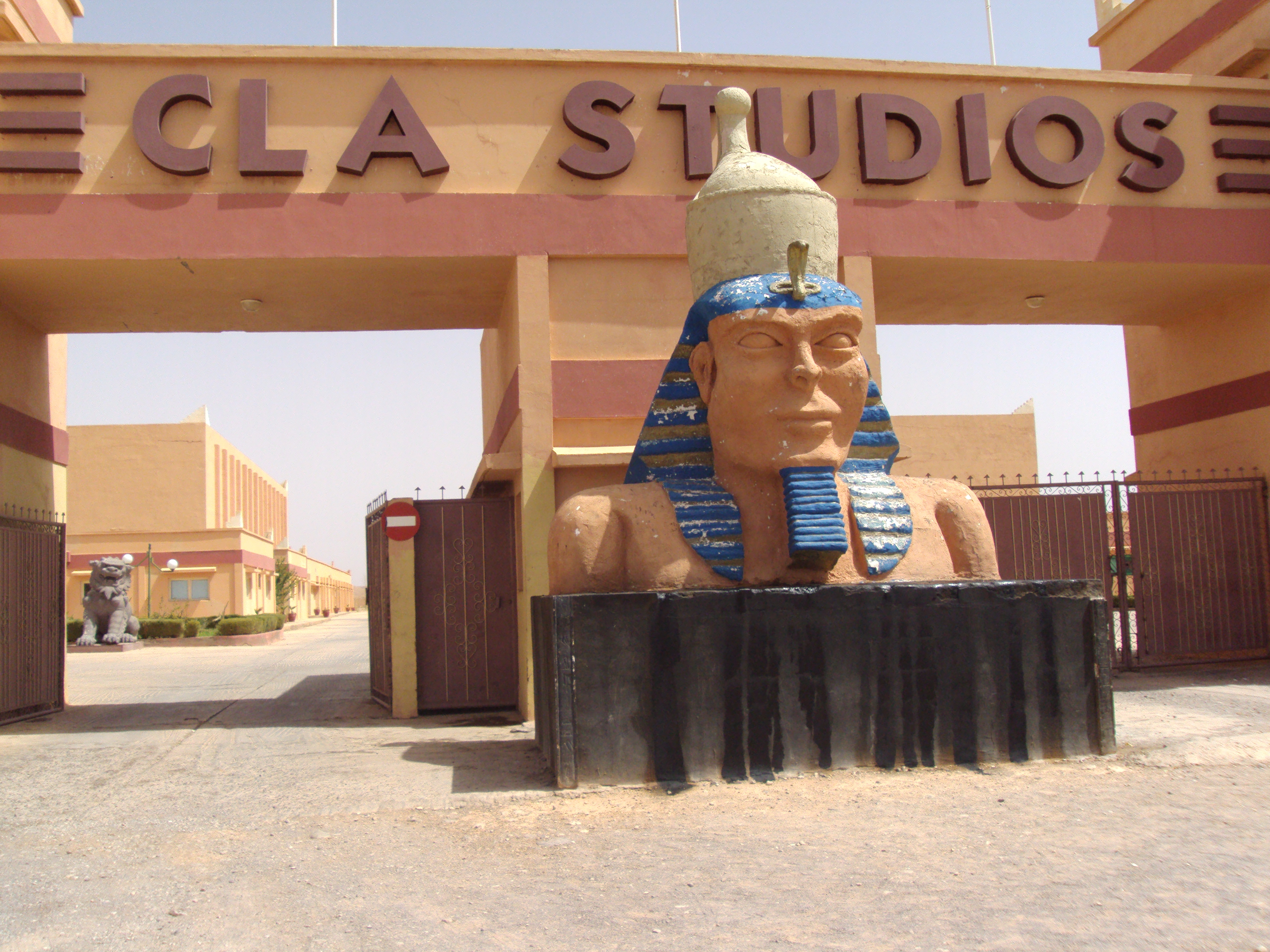
- CLA Studios in Ouarzazate, Morocco
- No. of screens: 68 (2011)
  - Per capita: 0.2 per 100,000 (2011)
- Main distributors: Megarama; Magreb Modern Films; Younes

Produced feature films (2011)
- Fictional: 55
- Animated: -
- Documentary: 1

Number of admissions (2012)
- Total: 2,011,294
  - Per capita: 0.08 (2010)
- National films: 681,341 (33.8%)

Gross box office (2012)
- Total: MAD 69.2 million
- National films: MAD 19.3 million (27.8%)

Cinema of Morocco (Arabic: السينما المغربية) refers to the film industry of Morocco. Aside from Arabic-language films, Moroccan cinema also produces Tamazight-language films. The first film in Morocco was shot by Louis Lumière in 1897. The first three Moroccan feature films were funded between 1968-1969. Most researchers and critics agree that the history of Moroccan cinema started with Hamid Bénani's Wechma (1970), which is recognised as the first cult movie in Moroccan film history, and received critical acclaim on an international scale. Until then films produced in the country were Moroccanised versions of Egyptian melodramas. Other influential Moroccan films include A Thousand and One Hands, which was the first feature length fiction film of the 1970s.

In 1982, Farida Bourquia became the first female Moroccan director, after her pioneering feature Al-Jamra. In 2001, King Mohammed VI of Morocco created the Marrakech International Film Festival to promote and develop the art of cinema and the film industry in Morocco. In 2018, the first Moroccan fantasy film, Achoura, was released. Amazigh films, also known as Berber films, began to receive support by the Moroccan Cinematographic Center (CCM) in the mid-2000s; an example is Tamazight Oufella.

In what has been described as a "vibrant new era" of Arab cinema, the 2020s has seen some stability in the Moroccan film industry. In 2022, the first Moroccan animated films and animated series were produced. In 2023, Moroccan cinema saw record-breaking production numbers, box office hits, and new infrastructure, partly due to the CCM's support and investments in upgrading and digitizing theaters. Moroccan cinema saw a dramatic surge in foreign investments, with 1.14 billion dirhams flowing into Moroccan film productions. Despite the success of local cinema and the national film scene, Hollywood dominated the market share, as opposed to French, Indian, and Egyptian films which accounted for less than 11% of the market by year's end.

== History ==
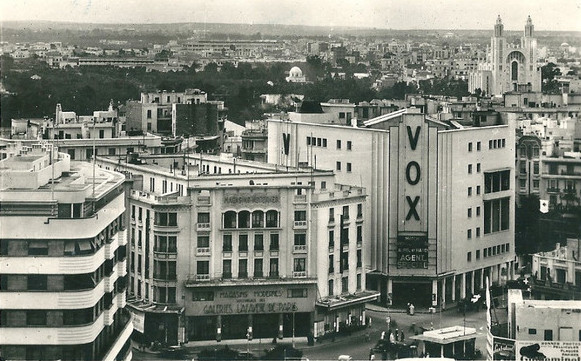
Cinema Vox (Casablanca) in 1950

Cinema in Morocco has a long history, stretching back over a century to the filming of Le chèvrier Marocain ("The Moroccan Goatherd") by Louis Lumière in 1897. Between that time and 1944, many foreign movies were shot in the country, especially in the Ouarzazate area.

In the first half of the 20th century, Casablanca had many movie theaters, such as Cinema Rialto, Cinema Lynx and Cinema Vox—the largest in Africa at the time it was built.

In 1944, the Moroccan Cinematographic Center (CCM), the nation's film regulatory body, was established. Studios were also opened in Rabat.

Salut Casa! (1952) was a propaganda film brandishing France's purported colonial triumph in its civilizing mission in the city.

In 1952, Orson Welles' Othello won the Palme d'Or at the Cannes Film Festival under the Moroccan flag. However, the festival's musicians did not play the Moroccan national anthem, as no one in attendance, knew what it was. Six years later, Mohammed Ousfour made the first Moroccan movie, Le fils maudit ("The Damned Son"). (L'Enfant Maudit)

In 1968, the first Mediterranean Film Festival of Morocco was held in Tangier. In its current editions, the event is held in Tetouan. This festival was followed in 1982 with the first national festival of cinema, which was held in Rabat. In 2001, the International Film Festival of Marrakech (FIFM) started its yearly festival in Marrakesh.

Mostafa Derkaoui's 1973 film About Some Meaningless Events (Arabic: أحداث بلا دلالة) was screened twice in Morocco before it was banned under Hassan II.

Love in Casablanca (1991), starring Abdelkrim Derkaoui and Muna Fettou, was one of the first Moroccan films to deal with Morocco's complex realities and depict life in Casablanca with verisimilitude. Bouchra Ijork's 2007 made-for-TV film Bitter Orange achieved wide support among Moroccan viewers. Nour-Eddine Lakhmari's Casanegra (2008) depicts the harsh realities of Casablanca's working classes. The films Ali Zaoua (2000), Horses of God (2012), Much Loved (2015), and Ghazzia (2017) of Nabil Ayouch—a French director of Moroccan heritage—deal with street crime, terrorism, and social issues in Casablanca, respectively. The events in Meryem Benm'Barek-Aloïsi's 2018 film Sofia revolve around an illegitimate pregnancy in Casablanca. Hicham Lasri and Said Naciri are also from Casablanca.

In 2021 Casablanca Beats became the first Moroccan film to be selected to compete for the Palme d'Or since 1962.

Atlas Studios in Warzazat is a large movie studio.

The Marrakech International Film Festival was first held in 2001.

In his book La septième porte (The Seventh Door), the poet, novelist and filmmaker Ahmed Bouanani (1938-2011) retraces 24 years of Moroccan film history. As described by literary critic and publisher Kenza Sefrioui, who edited Bouanani's personal history of cinema in Morocco, the author "recounts scenarios, he details the atmosphere of the scenes, he attests to reception, and he presents himself as an often ironic, sometimes humorous commentator, in dialogue with his reader."

== Film industry in Morocco ==
=== Directors ===
A first generation of directors made film in Morocco in the 1970s-1990s and developed the film industry in Morocco. Notable film makers are Hamid Bénani (Wechma, Traces, 1970), Souheil Ben Barka (Les Mille et une Mains, 1974), Moumen Smihi (El Chergui ou le Silence violent, 1975), Ahmed El Maânouni (Alyam, Alyam, 1978; Transes (Al Hal), 1981; Les Cœurs brûlés, 2007), Jilali Ferhati (Poupées de roseau, 1981; La Plage des enfants perdus, 1991), Mustapha Derkaoui (Les Beaux Jours de Shéhérazade, 1982); Farida Benlyazid (Une porte sur le ciel, 1988), Saâd Chraïbi (Chronique d'une vie normale, 1990), Mohamed Abderrahmane Tazi (Badis, 1989; À la recherche du mari de ma femme, 1993), Abdelkader Lagtaâ (Un amour à Casablanca, 1992; La Porte close, 1998), Hakim Noury (Le Marteau et l'Enclume, 1990), Hassan Benjelloun (La Fête des autres, 1990).

Since roughly the year 2000, a younger generation of Moroccan filmmakers has been taking over. Some of its prominent names are:

- Nabil Ayouch
- Hisham Lasri
- Narjiss Nejjar
- Faouzi Bensaïdi
- Nour-Eddine Lakhmari
- Doha Moustaquim
- Zakaria Zahrani
- Laïla Marrakchi (her first full-length feature film, Marock, produced in 2004 was nominated at the Festival de Cannes 2005 in the category "Un certain regard").

=== Festivals ===
- International Film Festival of Marrakech
- Mediterranean Film Festival

== Actors ==
=== Living in Morocco ===
- Latefa Ahrrare
- Driss Aït Jimhi
- Hussein Aït Jimhi
- Sana Akroud
- Sanâa Alaoui
- Said Amel
- Amal Ayouch
- Salima Benmoumen
- Assaad Bouab
- Hassan El Fad
- Rachid El Ouali
- Zineb Ennajem
- Noureddine Ettaouil
- Kenza Fridou
- Nadia Kounda
- Hicham Bahloul
- Sadiaa Ladib
- Mohammed Marouazi
- Amine Nasseur
- Driss Roukhe
- Ahmed Saguia
- Karim Saidi
- Abderrahim Tounsi

=== Living abroad (mainly in France) ===
- Amidou
- Souad Amidou
- Rachid Badouri
- Jamel Debbouze
- Mustapha El Atrassi
- Gad Elmaleh
- Rachida Khalil
- Hicham Nazzal
- Ahmed Sagui
- Saïd Taghmaoui
- Roschdy Zem
- Soufiane El Khalidy

== National structure ==
=== Union and professional organizations ===
The Moroccan Cinematographic Centre (Centre cinématographique marocain) is a public institution under the Ministry of Culture for the promotion, distribution and projection of movies in Morocco. Most other organisations related to films and cinemas are grouped into business chambers or trade unions, for example the National Federation of Film Clubs or the National Chamber of Film Producers.

=== Film studios ===
- studios ATLAS (Ouarzazate)
- studios KAN ZAMANE
- studios CINEDINA (Soualem)
- studios ESTER ANDROMEDA
- CLA Studios (Ouarzazate)
- studios CINECITTA (Ouarzazate)

=== Institutes for film and audiovisual studies ===
- The Superior School of Visual Arts of Marrakech (ESAVM)
- Institut spécialisé dans le métiers du cinéma (ISMC) Ouarzazate
- Institut spécialisé du cinéma et de l'audiovisuel (ISCA) de Rabat
- Institut supérieur des métiers de l'audiovisuel et du cinéma (ISMAC)

== See also ==
- Arab cinema
- Egyptian cinema
- List of Moroccan films
- List of foreign movies shot in Morocco
- Culture of Morocco
- Cinema of the world
