= Mouna Fettou =

Moroccan actress (born 1970)

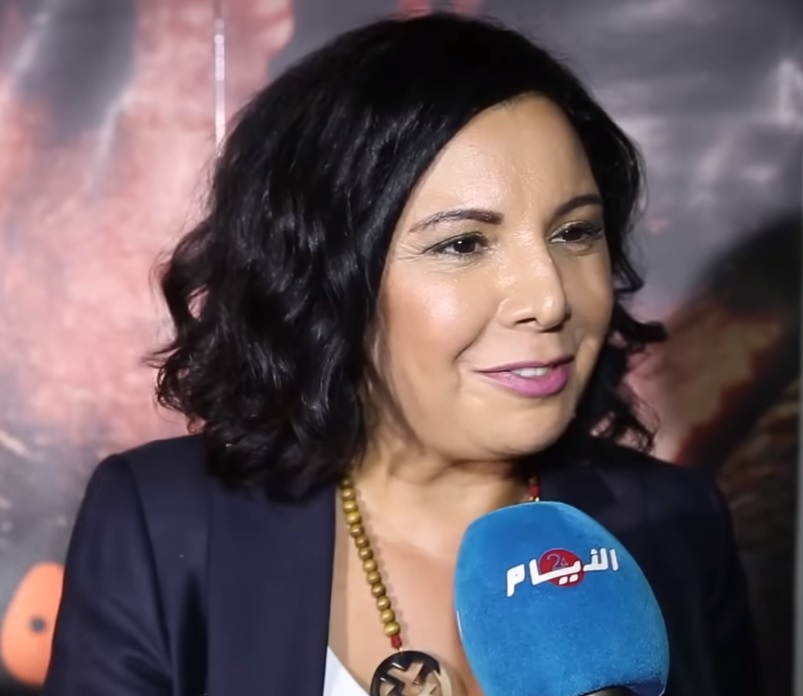
- Born: November 28, 1970 (age 55); Rabat, Morocco
- Citizenship: Morocco
- Occupation: Actress
- Notable work: À la recherche du mari de ma femme, I Saw Ben Barka Get Killed, Femmes... et femmes

Mouna Fettou (Arabic: منى فتو; born November 28, 1970) is a Moroccan actress who starred in a number of movies, plays, and TV shows.

== Career ==
Some of her most famous roles were in the films À la recherche du mari de ma femme (1995), Women... and Women (1997), Bnat Rahma ( 2008) and the serie Bnat el Asass ( 2021 ) She hosts the TV show Jari Ya Jari on Medi1 TV.

She was honored with special recognition at the 2019 Marrakech International Film Festival for her 30 years of acting.

Mouna Fettou made her theater debut by joining the professional theater workshop of the Mohammed-V National Theater from 1988 to 1990 .

Mouna Fettou married on March 6, 1998 in Rabat to the director Saâd Chraïbi, with whom she had a son. They then divorced in July 2005.

== Acting credits ==
=== Cinema ===
Year	Title	Role	Director	Notes
1991	A Love in Casablanca	Saloua	Abdelkader Lagtaâ	
1993	In Search of My Wife's Husband	Houda	Mohamed Abderrahman Tazi	
1994	A Lethal Game	Rita	Omar Chraibi	Short film
1995	Five Films for a Hundred Years	Segment "Sur la Terrasse"	Farida Belyazid	
1995	Dollar		Mohamed Minkhar	Short film
1996	Fabula	Siham	Omar Chraibi	Short film
1997	Express in Silence	Karima	Hakim Noury	
1998	Women... and Women	Zakia	Saad Chraibi	
2001	The Love Life of Hajj El Mokhtar Soldi	Rkia	Mostafa Derkaoui	
2001	Thirst	Menna	Saad Chraibi	
2002	And now... Ladies and Gentlemen	Receptionist	Claude Lelouch	
2004	Jawhara : Jail Girl	Jawhara's Mother	Saad Chraibi	
2005	Ici et Là	Fatema	Mohamed Ismail	
2005	I Saw Ben Barka Get Killed	Ghita Ben Barka	Serge Le Péron	
2006	Heaven's Doors	Yasmine	Imad Noury; Swel Noury	
2007	Two Women On The Road	Amina	Farida Bourquia	
2010	Awlad Lablad	Saadia	Mohamed Ismail	
2011	Marh'ba	Habiba Berrada	Zakia Tahiri ; Ahmed Bouchaala	
2015	The Blind Orchestra	Halima	Mohamed Mouftakir	
2017	Catch The Wind	Mina	Gaël Morel	
2017	Volubilis	Faty	Faouzi Bensaidi	
2020	Frère II Sang		Mohcine Nadifi	Short film
2022	Summer Days	Jalila	Faouzi Bensaidi	

=== Television ===
Year	Title	Role	Director	Notes
2001	Jenan Al Karma	Mennana	Farida Bourquia	historical drama series : 30 episodes
2002	Affaire Sara T	Sara	Saad Chraibi	Television film
2004	Majda	Majda	Abdeslam Kelai	Television film
2006	Alhay Alkhalfi	Nawal	Farida Bourquia	Television film
2006	Rhimou : the movie	Rhimou	Ismail Saidi	Television film
2007	Rhimou : the series	Rhimou	Ismail Saidi	Comedy Series : 30 episodes
2008	Bnat Rahma	Touria - Asmaa	Farida Bourquia	Television film
2008	Un mari à louer	Mona	Said Naciri	Television film
2010-2012	Yak Hna Jirane	Ghita	Driss Roukhe	Sitcom : 90 episodes
2010	The Actress	Fayza	Narjiss Najjar	Television film
2013	A Wili o Marhba	Mounia	Narjiss Najjar	Television film
2014	Jari ya Jari	Herself	-	Talk Show on Medi1 TV
2018	L'usine	Leila	Mohamed Amine Mouna	Drama series : 30 episodes
2019	Dounia Douara	Oum El Ghait	Mohamed Nesrate	Drama series : 30 episodes
2021	Bnat El Assas	Aicha	Driss Roukhe	Drama series : 30 episodes
2023	Ghader Al-Zaman	Dr Amal	Yassine Fennane	Drama series : 24 episodes
2024	Hayat Khassa (A Private Life)	Ghita	Mourad El Khoudi	Drama series : 30 episodes
2024	Khat Rajaa	Houria	Adil El Fadili	Drama series : 30 episodes
2025	Rahma	Rahma	Ali El Mejboud	Drama series : 30 episodes

=== Theatre ===
- Nous sommes faits pour nous entendre by Tayeb Saddiki
- The elephant by Faouzi BenSaïdi
- Bartlett by Faouzi BenSaïdi
- El Batoule by Touriya Jabrane
- El Aïta Âlik by Touriya Jabrane
- Le Poulet aux Olives by Judith El Maleh and Nicolas Nebot
