= Hamid Najah =

Moroccan theater and film actor

- Born: 27 March 1949; Casablanca
- Citizenship: Morocco
- Occupation(s): Actor, Stage actor, Painter

Hamid Najah (1949 – 28 February 2024) was a Moroccan theater and film actor, set designer, poet, and artist.

== Early life ==
Hamid Najah was born in 1949 in Casablanca. In a 2010 interview with Aujourd'hui Le Maroc, he described the neighborhood Derb Sultan as "my entire childhood, it's almost my life, it's my knowledge, my existence, because it's in this neighborhood where my artistic career began by meeting various people from Derb Sultan."

== Career ==
Renowned in theater, cinema, and fine arts, Najah he began his acting career as a comedian with "Al Masrah Al Bassime" at the Derb Bouchentouf Cultural Center, and "Achihab" by Mohamed Tsouli in 1966, then with the "Maâmora" troupe in 1970, before heading to Paris, France to study theater with one of the major figures in Brazilian theater, Augusto Boal. A director and set designer, he underwent formal theater training in the early 1970s.

Najah starred in significant film productions since the mid-1970s including Mostafa Derkaoui's About Some Meaningless Events in 1974 and Mohammed Reggab's The Barber of the Poor District, among others, in addition to his various roles on television.

Najah was also a poet, writing in French, and an artist known for his drawings and murals.

== Death ==
Najah died on 28 February 2024 in Casablanca following a long illness.

== Filmography ==
- About Some Meaningless Events (1974)
- The Barber of the Poor District (1982)
- Le goudron (1984)
