= Les inqualifiables =

Moroccan comedian duo

Les inqualifiables is a Moroccan comedian duo, founded in 2013 and composed of Oubeid Allah Hlal and Amine Belghazi.

== Career ==
On April 17, 2014, les inqualifiables made their debut on stage with the show Qui es-tu.

In 2016, they collaborated with Hassan El Fad in Hassan EL Fad ou rba3to.

In August 2017, they participated in the 1st edition of the Juste pour rire festival in Agadir.

In 2018, they participated in Gala Marocain du Marrakech du rire, as well as in Jamel Debbouze's show at Megarama in Casablanca.

In January 2019, they started a world tour with their new show Si y a moi ya toi.

In May 2019, they organize the 5th edition of the Aji Tahdam festival, which has the participation of several artists, in particular, Hanane El Fadili with her one man show Hanane Show and Amine Radi with her show Va dormir Va.

== Shows ==
2014: Qui es-tu? (Who are you?)

2015: 2 heures de rire (2 hours of laughter)

2015: Aji Tahdam 1

2016: Hassan EL Fad ou rba3to

2016: Aji Tahdam 2

2017: Aji Tahdam 3

2017: Les inqualifiables at Marrakech du rire

2017: Les inqualifiables at Afrique Du Rire festival

2018: Aji Tahdam festival

2018: Hadou Houma Hna

2019: Si’a moi y'a toi tour

== Emissions ==
- Dhak Tkhssr
- NB! بيني نويطا

== Movies ==
- 30 million (friendly participation)
