= Chraibi =

Chraibi or Chraïbi (Arabic: الشرايبي) is a Moroccan surname. Notable people with the surname include:

- Abdeslam Chraïbi (1936–2006), Moroccan actor and playwright
- Aboubakr Chraïbi (born 1962), French–Moroccan philologist and writer
- Chafik Chraïbi (born 1956), Moroccan gynecologist and obstetrician
- Driss Chraïbi (1926–2007), Moroccan author
- Lamia Chraibi, Franco–Moroccan film producer
- Larbi Chraïbi (1921–2019), Moroccan politician
- Omar Chraïbi (born 1961), Moroccan filmmaker, producer, and screenwriter
- Rochdi Chraibi (born 1962), Moroccan cabinet member
- Saâd Chraïbi (born 1952), Moroccan director and screenwriter
- Saïd Chraibi (1951–2016), Moroccan musician
