= Lalla Laaroussa =

Moroccan television game show

- Arabic: لالة لعروسة
- Genre: Entertainment
- Created by: Rabii Chajid
- Country of origin: Morocco
- Original language: Moroccan Arabic
- No. of seasons: 17
- No. of episodes: 136

Production
- Running time: 2h

Original release
- Release: 8 June 2006 – present

Lalla Laaroussa is an annual Moroccan television game show produced by the SNRT and broadcast on Al Aoula every Saturday evening (rebroadcast on Sunday afternoon) each prime-time of the show includes summaries, competitions, challenges. The idea is to involve newlyweds in order to win a dream home, a wedding party organized in Marrakesh, as well as a honeymoon in a touristic country of their choice. The others who do not reach the final win Also checks or home appliances.

== Winners ==
- Season 2006: Bouchra and Karim from Larache
- Season 2007: Fatima Al-Zahra and Naeem from Essaouira
- Season 2008: Kawthar and Radwan from Laayoune
- Season 2009: Widad and Yassin from Marrakesh
- Season 2010: Widad and Sultan from Meknes
- Season 2011: Asma and Anwar from Zagora
- Season 2012: Khadija and Zakaria from Agadir
- Season 2014: Inssaf and Yassin from Tangier
- Season 2015: Aziza and Marwan from Casablanca
- Season 2016: Hassnaa and Ayub from El Jadida
- Season 2017: Nesreen and Monaam from Tan-Tan
- Season 2018: Kawtar and Abderahman from Tangier
- Season 2019: Fatima Zahra and Jawad from Marrakesh
- Season 2020: Rahma and Mohamed from Casablanca
- Season 2021: Ghita and Wadie from Fez
- Season 2022: Soukaina and Mohamed from Kasba Tadla

== Hosts ==
- 2006: Najat El Ouafi and Abdallah Didan (actors)
- 2007-2008: Rachid El Ouali (actor) Rachid El Idrissi
- 2009: Khadija Assad and Aziz Saadlah (actors and married in real life)
- 2010: Fatine El Yousr, Ibtissam Koutaibi and Younes Belasri
- 2011: Fatine El Yousr, Ibtissam Koutaibi and Younes Belasri
- 2012: Fatima Khair and Azzedine Tsouli (actors and married in real life)
- 2014: Fatima Khair and Abdessamad Miftah El Kheir (actors)
- 2015: Fatima Khair and Abdessamad Miftah El Kheir (actors)
- 2016: Fatima Khair and Abdessamad Miftah El Kheir (actors)
- 2017: Fatima Khair and Abdessamad Miftah El Kheir (actors)
- 2018: Safae Hbirkou (Actor)
- 2019: Safae Hbirkou (Actor)
- 2020: Safae Hbirkou (Actor)
- 2021: Houda Rihani and Kamal kadimi (Actors)
- 2022: Dounia Boutazout and Fadilla Benmoussa (Actors)
- 2023: Dounia Boutazout and Fadilla Benmoussa (Actors)
- 2024: Dounia Boutazout and Fadilla Benmoussa (Actors)
