= Général, nous voilà! =

1997 film by Ali Essafi

- Directed by: Ali Essafi
- Cinematography: Isabelle Fermon
- Edited by: Alberto Yacelini
- Release date: 1997
- Running time: 60 minutes
- Countries: Morocco, France

Général, nous voilà! is a 1997 documentary film directed by Ali Essafi in his directorial debut. It won a Grand Jury Award at the Festival International du Film Francophone de Namur. It was shown at the Carthage Film Festival and at the Paris Biennale of Arab Cinema.
