= 44 or Tales of the Night =

- Directed by: Moumen Smihi
- Written by: Moumen Smihi
- Cinematography: Abdelkarim Derkaoui, Pierre Lhomme
- Edited by: Moumen Smihi
- Music by: Guido Baggiani, Ben Yarmolinsky
- Release date: 1985
- Running time: 115 minutes
- Countries: Morocco, France

44 or Tales of the Night (French: 44 ou les récits de la nuit, Arabic: 44 aw Oustourat al layl) is a French-Moroccan film directed by Moroccan filmmaker Moumen Smihi in 1981 and released in 1985.

== Synopsis ==
The film chronicles the tale of two Moroccan families, one from Fez, the other from Chaouen, from 1912 to 1956, the duration of the European protectorate over Morocco.

== Cast ==
- Pierre Clémenti
- Abdelslam Faraoui
- Marie-France Pisier
- Christine Pascal
- Khady Thiam
- Mohamed El Habachi
- Naima Lamcharki
