= Femmes... et Femmes =

- Directed by: Saâd Chraïbi
- Written by: Jamal Belmedjoub, Saâd Chraïbi
- Produced by: Saâd Chraïbi
- Cinematography: Kamal Derkaoui
- Edited by: Hélène Muller
- Music by: Ali Souissi, Hassan Souissi
- Release date: 1999
- Running time: 98 minutes
- Country: Morocco
- Language: Moroccan Arabic

Femmes... et Femmes (English: "Women... and Women") is a 1999 Moroccan comedy drama film directed by Saâd Chraïbi. The film inaugurated a trilogy devoted to the condition of Moroccan women and dealt with the subjects of domestic violence and gender inequality. At the time, the film broke all Moroccan box office records, selling 72,138 tickets in its first week. The film would go on to win three prizes at the 5th National Film Festival in Casablanca.

== Synopsis ==
Zakia, Leila, Keltoum and Ghita, four women from the city, reunite after years of separation. The film follows their intersecting destinies as they fight to regain their status and place in society.

== Cast ==
- Mouna Fettou
- Fatema Khair
- Touria Alaoui
- Salima Benmoumen
- Hamid Basket
- Touria Jabrane
