= Avec Matisse à Tanger =

- Directed by: Moumen Smihi
- Written by: Moumen Smihi
- Produced by: Moumen Smihi
- Narrated by: Daniel Mesguish
- Cinematography: Robert Alzraki
- Edited by: Mario Graziano
- Music by: Eric Satie; Arnold Schoenberg; Aaron Coplan
- Release date: 1993
- Running time: 52 minutes
- Country: Morocco
- Language: Moroccan Arabic

Avec Matisse à Tanger (English: With Matisse in Tangier) is a 1993 Moroccan documentary film directed by Moumen Smihi.

== Synopsis ==
The film chronicles Henri Matisse's travels to Tangier as he seeks new motifs for his paintings from a Moroccan perspective.
