= Les Casablancais =

- Directed by: Abdelkader Lagtaâ
- Written by: Abdelkader Lagtaâ
- Produced by: Ian Boyd, Freddy Denaës
- Starring: Abdelazziz Saâdallah, Khadija Assad, Salaheddine Benmoussa
- Cinematography: Michel La Veaux
- Music by: Robert Marcel Lepage
- Release date: 1999
- Countries: Morocco; France; Canada
- Languages: Moroccan Arabic, French

Les Casablancais (English: People of Casablanca, Moroccan Arabic: Bidaoua) is a 1999 drama film directed by Abdelkader Lagtaâ. It was screened at multiple national film festivals and several international ones, including the 1999 Berlin International Film Festival.

== Synopsis ==
A polyphonic portrait of the city of Casablanca through the intersecting itineraries of three characters: a bookseller who receives an unexpected correspondence that forces him to question himself deeply, a young teacher whose application for a passport triggers an absurd investigation, and a teenager who, because of a misunderstanding with his fundamentalist teacher, becomes the victim of a manipulation with tragic consequences.

== Cast ==
- Abdelaziz Saâdallah
- Khadija Assad
- Karina Aktouf
- Salaheddine Benmoussa
- Nourredine Bikr
- Omar Sayed
- Saïda Baadi
- Mohamed Benbrahim
- Amine Kably
