= Simoh, the Unlucky Man =

- Si Moh, pas de chance
- Directed by: Moumen Smihi
- Written by: Moumen Smihi
- Produced by: Moumen Smihi
- Starring: Abdesalam Skini
- Cinematography: Colin Mounier
- Edited by: Claude Farny
- Music by: Gerard Delassaus
- Release date: 1971
- Running time: 17 minutes
- Country: Morocco
- Language: Moroccan Arabic

Simoh, the Unlucky Man (French: Si Moh, pas de chance) is a 1971 Moroccan short film by Moumen Smihi. It was shot in 16 mm, in black and white.

== Synopsis ==
The film follows Si Moh (Abdeslam Sakini), a North African immigrant looking for a job in Paris. He wanders around the French banlieues, eventually gets lost, and ultimately spends his first night on the stairs of a subway station.
