= Between Desire and Uncertainty =

Entre désir et incertitude
- Directed by: Abdelkader Lagtaâ
- Screenplay by: Abdelkader Lagtaâ
- Produced by: Jean Lodato
- Cinematography: Cyril Collot
- Edited by: Vincent Morgenstern
- Music by: Pierre-Yves Lenik
- Release date: 2010
- Running time: 52 minutes
- Country: Morocco

Between Desire and Uncertainty (Entre désir et incertitude) is a 2010 Moroccan documentary film.

== Synopsis ==
This is the first documentary film dedicated to Moroccan cinema; Between Desire and Uncertainty hands the microphone over to the filmmakers and film critics. Besides offering a brief historical approach, this documentary strives to identify the different movements that push Moroccan cinema. Likewise, it also makes very clear the dangers that threaten cinema's evolution.
