= La dame du Caire =

- سيدة القاهرة (Sayyidatul Qahira)
- Directed by: Moumen Smihi
- Written by: Bechir Adik, Moumen Smihi
- Starring: Youssra, Gamil Ratib, Nabil Halafaoui
- Cinematography: Tarek Telemsani
- Edited by: Youssef Mellakh
- Music by: Georges Kazazian
- Production company: Imago Films International
- Release date: 1991
- Running time: 90 minutes
- Country: Morocco
- Language: Moroccan Arabic

La dame du Caire (English: The Lady from Cairo, Arabic: سيدة القاهرة) is a 1991 Moroccan film directed by Moumen Smihi. It was filmed and produced in Egypt alongside Egyptian artists.

== Synopsis ==
Jawhara, a young peasant girl from the Nile, becomes a famous singer and relocates to Cairo. Fame, money and love cannot make her forget the passion she feels for her twin brother.

== Cast ==
- Youssra
- Gamil Ratib
- Nabil Halafaoui
- Mahmoud Himida
- Abdelaziz Makhioune
