= The Sorrows of a Young Tangerian =

Tanjaoui
- Directed by: Moumen Smihi
- Written by: Moumen Smihi
- Starring: Mohammed Alami, Younes Chakkour, Helene Morguen
- Cinematography: Thierry Lebigre
- Edited by: Ody Roos, Moumen Smihi, Mattéo Boso
- Release date: 2013
- Running time: 95 minutes
- Country: Morocco
- Language: Moroccan Arabic

The Sorrows of a Young Tangerian (Arabic title: Tanjawi, French title: Tangérois) is a 2013 Moroccan film directed by Moumen Smihi.

== Synopsis ==
The third part of a loosely autobiographical trilogy, the film chronicles Larbi Salmi's rebellious young adulthood during Morocco's early years of independence.

== Cast ==
- Mohammed Alami
- Younes Chakkour
- Helene Morguen
- Hamza Elbardai
- Othman Sellami
- Astrid Roos
- Najoua Kalyé
- Saïd Amel
- Azzelarab Kaghat
