= Belyout Bouchentouf =

Moroccan businessman

H.E. Belyout Bouchentouf
- Born: Belyout Bouchentouf; Casablanca
- Occupations: Statesman, Philanthropist
- Children: 6 among them: Amine Bouchentouf Myriam Bouchentouf Khalid Bouchentouf
- Parent: Mohammed Bouchentouf (father)
- Relatives: Princess Lalla Asma of Morocco (daughter-in-law); King Hassan II (in-law)

His Excellency Belyout Bouchentouf was a businessman, statesman and philanthropist from the Kingdom of Morocco. Born in Casablanca at the turn of the 20th century, he left a lasting legacy in the capital and the Kingdom.

== Mayor of Casablanca (1976-1994) ==
H.E. Belyout Bouchentouf was elected mayor of Casablanca for three consecutive six-year mandates, a record number of terms for the city. He served as mayor from 1976 up to 1994.

As Mayor of Casablanca for 18 years, he had direct responsibility of the Kingdom's largest city. With a population of over 3 million people, which represented well over 10% of the country's total population, he wielded considerable influence in the country. As mayor, he led many of the city's largest developments in infrastructure, education, athletics, and cultural life.

He was instrumental in raising Casablanca's international profile, and spearheaded the initiative to make Casablanca Sister Cities with Los Angeles, Chicago, Rio de Janeiro (Brazil) and many others. See Casablanca Sister Cities.

== President, Royal Boxing Federation and National Olympic Committee (1982-1997) ==
H.E. Belyout Bouchentouf remains the longest serving President of the Royal Boxing Federation in Morocco. He was a strong advocate of boxing and recruited many youths to the sport.

He also served as Member of the National Olympic Committee responsible for sending athletes to participate in the Olympic Games.

Under his leadership, Morocco won Olympic medals in boxing in both the 1988 Seoul Olympic Games as well as the 1992 Summer Olympics in Barcelona. This accomplishment was lauded by the press around the Arab world and broader Middle East region.

== Member of Parliament ==
H.E. Belyout Bouchentouf served as a Member of Parliament in the Parliament of the Kingdom of Morocco. He represented the National Rally of Independents (NRI) party. NRI (also known as RNI) is known for being the Kingdom's most pro-business party, currently being represented by the current Prime Minister of Morocco, Mr. Aziz Akhanouch.

== Director, ONA Group (1985-1997) ==
He was an active participant in the Moroccan business community through various interests, including as Director and/or Shareholder of ONA GROUP and its subsidiaries, subsequently renamed AL MADA. The Group is the largest conglomerate in the Kingdom and H.E. Belyout was an active member of the Group and its most important subsidiaries, including:

- Director, MANAGEM (largest mining operation in the country, and one of the largest producers of Cobalt in the world; other metals include zinc, silver and gold)
- Director, COSUMAR (largest sugar processor and manufacturer in the country)
- Director, MARJANE (largest supermarket chain in the country)
- Director, LESIEUR (largest vegetable and cooking oil manufacturer and distributor in the country)
- Director, PEUGEOT (one of the largest auto distributors in the country)
- Director, CITROEN (one of the largest auto distributors in the country)

In Addition, he was country representative for a number of international businesses, including:

- ADIDAS (German footwear and apparel company)
- RAYTHEON (American defense and communications company)
- ITT (American industrial electronics company)
- TALBOT (French automobile manufacturer)

H.E. was an avid and passionate fan of cinema; he owned a number of movie theatres in the country, including the CINEMA RIALTO, as well as Cinema Kawakib. In addition, he represented multiple major movie studios as exclusive distributor, including:

- WARNER BROS
- PARAMOUNT
- MGM
- UNIVERSAL PICTURES

== President, Bouchentouf Foundation ==
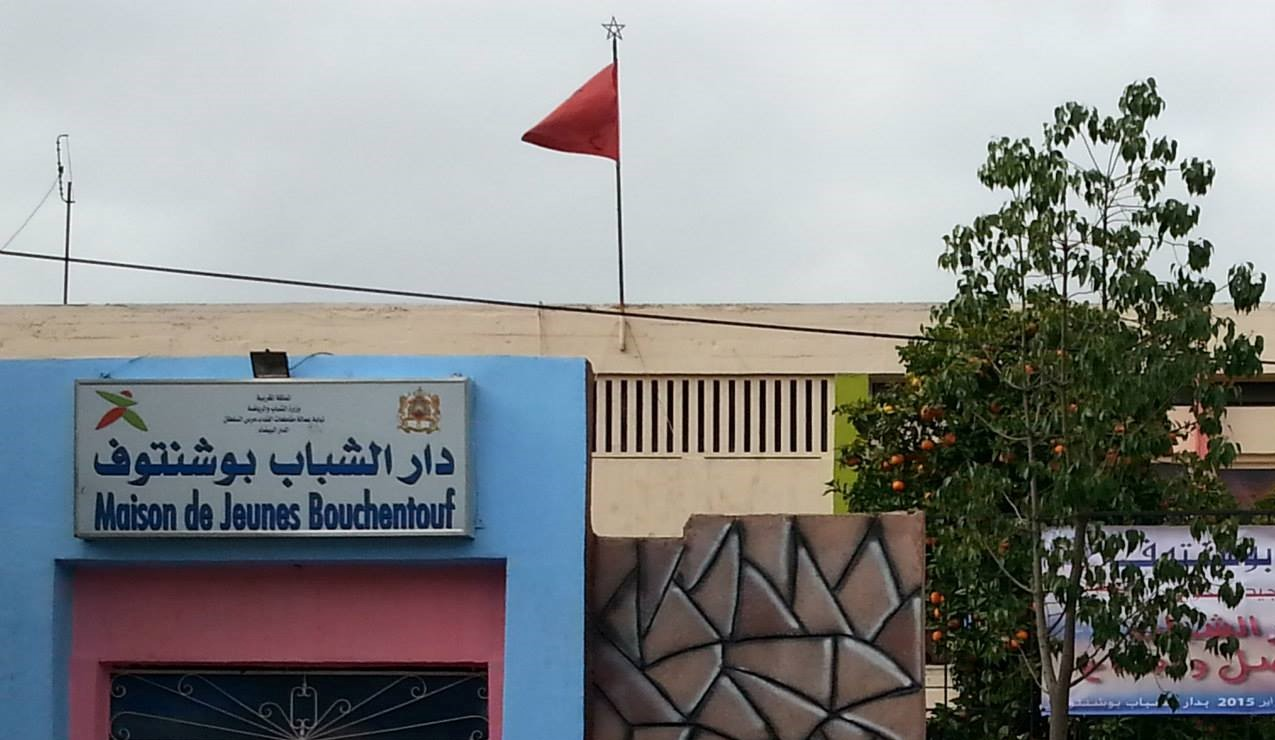
Bouchentouf Foundation

H.E. was known as one of the most generous philanthropists of his time who remained close to his constituents. He set up multiple foundations and charities to assist citizens in need while he was Mayor. One of his long-lasting efforts is (Bouchentouf Foundation), a center he helped establish in the Bouchentouf neighborhood.

The Foundation is located on a 5000 square meter land he donated to house the facility, which includes a computer lab, music room, theater and multiple sports facilities (including a gym, indoor soccer court and basketball court). The Foundation is a home-away-from-home for many underprivileged children and provides them a safe zone to develop new skills. The Foundation has been recognized for its contributions by King Mohammed VI, and is now included as part of a program within the .

== Bouchentouf Neighborhood in Casablanca (1892 - Present) ==
H.E. was an avid participant in the real estate sector, with commercial and residential holdings around the country, including the Belyout Bouchentouf was born in Casablanca. His father Mohammed Bouchentouf was also born in Casablanca and is credited, along with five other families, of being one of the founding families of modern-day Casablanca. The Bouchentouf Neighborhood (Derb Bouchentouf in Arabic), which was founded by Belyout Bouchentouf's father in 1892, is a major neighborhood in downtown Casablanca with a population of over 45,000 people today.

The neighborhood is located in the heart of Casablanca, not far from the Royal Palace of Casablanca.

A number of famous artists, including Nass El Ghiwane, started out in the Bouchentouf neighborhood in the 1960s and 1970s.

== Bouchentouf and the Royal Family of Morocco (1987 - Present) ==
Belyout Bouchentouf has six children.

In 1987, Belyout's middle son Khalid married Her Royal Highness Princess Lalla Asma, daughter of His Majesty King Hassan II and sister of the current King, His Majesty King Mohammed VI. The marriage ceremony was attended by many dignitaries including His Majesty King Abdullah of Saudi Arabia (at the time Crown Prince) and other members of the Royal Families. As a part of the Royal Family of Morocco, he worked very closely with King Hassan II in instituting political and social reforms to improve the quality of life of citizens. His granddaughter, Lalla Nouhaila Bouchentouf married Ali El Hajji on 14 February 2021.

== Advisor to the Royal Court (1987-1997) ==
H.E. Belyout Bouchentouf was held in high regard by King Hassan II who respected H.E. Belyout Bouchentouf's political acumen and integrity. He served as Advisor to King Hassan II for a decade, advising on a range of domestic and international matters.

== President of Rialto ==
Rialto is a legendary movie theater located at the heart of Casablanca. H.E. Belyout Bouchentouf purchased the theater in 1956 and was its caretaker for several decades, including Edith Piaf, Dizzy Gillespie and many more.

== Casablanca American School ==
As Mayor of Casablanca, H.E. played a key role in the development of the . The school was an initiative between the US State Department and the Goodyear Corporation in the early 1970s. The US ambassador at the time, Robert Anderson (diplomat), asked H.E. Belyout Bouchentouf's help in acquiring the necessary licenses for the school to operate in the city as an international school. In coordination with other government officials, including the Ministry of Education, H.E. played an instrumental role in helping establish CAS as a fully operational international school in Casablanca. Subsequently, several of Belyout Bouchentouf's children attended the and he remained an active supporter of the school. H.E. advocated strong relationships between Morocco and the United States and participated in many meetings with US diplomats and business persons in Morocco and the US. In 1989, H.E. opened up Rialto to world-renowned musician to perform as part of a State Department sponsored event - all proceeds from the concert went to the school.
