= Un amour à Casablanca =

- Directed by: Abdelkader Lagtaâ
- Written by: Abdelkader Lagtaâ
- Starring: Mouna Fettou, Ahmed Naji, Mohamed Zouhir
- Cinematography: Abdelkarim Derkaoui
- Edited by: Abdelkader Lagtaâ
- Release date: 1991
- Running time: 100 minutes
- Country: Morocco
- Languages: Moroccan Arabic, French

Un amour à Casablanca (English: A Love in Casablanca) is a 1991 Moroccan drama film directed by Abdelkader Lagtaâ in his directorial debut. The relatively controversial film was a box office success.

== Synopsis ==
Feeling a strong sense of abandonment after her mother commits suicide and her sister runs away, eighteen-year-old Saloua is constantly fighting with her father and stepmother, because of the severity of one and the mockery of the other. She finds solace - and perhaps even love - in two men, one older and unstable, the other younger and exuberant.

== Cast ==
- Mouna Fettou
- Ahmed Naji
- Mohamed Zouhir
- Rachid El Ouali
- Hassan Essakalli
