= Virgins and Swallows =

- French: Les hirondelles: les cris de jeunes filles des hirondelles
- Directed by: Moumen Smihi
- Written by: Moumen Smihi
- Starring: Oussama Ouahani, Khouloud, Saïd Amel, Najwa Azizi
- Cinematography: Abdelkrim Derkaoui
- Edited by: Ody Roos, Moumen Smihi
- Production company: Imago Film International
- Release date: 2008
- Running time: 90 minutes
- Country: Morocco
- Language: Moroccan Arabic

Virgins and Swallows (French: Les hirondelles: les cris de jeunes filles des hirondelles) is a 2008 Moroccan film directed by Moumen Smihi.

== Synopsis ==
Larbi Salmi, the son of a theologian, is introduced by his mother to Rabea, a beautiful 17 year old girl fascinated by love stories.

== Cast ==
- Najwa Azizi
- Oussama Ouahani
- Saïd Amel
- Khouloud
- Bahija Hachami
- Latefa Ahrrare
- Najat El Wadi
