= Caftan d'Amour =

- Qouftan al houb mounaqat bil hawa
- Directed by: Moumen Smihi
- Written by: Gavin Lambert, Moumen Smihi, Mohamed M'rabet, Jacques Fieschi
- Starring: Natalie Roche, Mohamed Mehdi, Nezha Ragragui, Larbi Doghmi
- Cinematography: Jean-Michel Humeau
- Edited by: Martine Giordano
- Music by: George Riacada
- Production companies: Imago Film International, Ciné Maya Film
- Release date: 1987
- Running time: 75 minutes
- Country: Morocco
- Language: Moroccan Arabic

Caftan d'Amour (Constellé de passion) (English: Caftan of Love or The Big Mirror) is a 1987 Moroccan film directed by Moumen Smihi.

== Synopsis ==
Khalil, a young bachelor who tends to his family's farm on the outskirts of the city, is looking for his soulmate. He sees her in his dream: a young woman of exceptional beauty. He decides to marry her. By chance, the next day, in the alleys of the medina, he meets this girl, Rachida. In addition to her exceptional beauty, she has an exceptional behavior and by marrying her. Rachida, once a dream, quickly becomes a nightmare.

== Cast ==
- Natalie Roche
- Mohamed Mehdi
- Nezha Regragui
- Larbi Doghmi
- Isabelle Weingarten
