= Fayçal Azizi =

Musical artist

- Born: February 26, 1986 (age 40); Tetouan, Morocco
- Musical career
- Label: Rotana Records

Fayçal Azizi (Arabic: فيصل عزيزي; born 26 February 1986 in Tetuan) is a Moroccan actor and singer-songwriter. He's known for his song "Werda ala Werda" in the 2006 film The Bitter Orange, his songs with the band K'lma, and his 2015 cover of the Judeo-Moroccan folk song "Hak A Mama."

== Life ==
Fayçal Azizi started as a stage comedian after gaining admission to the Superior School of Dramatic Arts and Cultural Entertainment in Rabat. He created the music group K'lma in 2004, then joined the troupe Dabateatr in 2007, performing in several theater pieces such as Il/Houwa and Driss Ksikes's180 degrés. He also appeared as Habib in the series Kaboul Kitchen broadcast on the French TV channel Canal+.

== Filmography ==
- 2010: Nassim Abassi's Majid
- 2012: Mohamed Zineddaine's Colère, as Fouad
- 2012-2017: Kaboul Kitchen (TV series) on Canal+
- 2014: Super Market (TV series) on Al Aoula
- 2015: Karim Boukhari's The Wig (short film)
- 2017: Maha Eltaîb's W (Double V), as Mouhiz
- 2018: Disk Hayati (TV series) on 2M Maroc
- 2019: Moul Bendir on 2M Maroc
- 2022: Green Card (Cinema film)
- 2024: ACH HADA (TV series) on Al Aoula
- 2024: Bnat Lyoum (TV series) on 2M Maroc
- 2024: Camping Paradis (TV series) on TF1 France

== Distinctions ==
- May 12, 2015 : Morocco Music Awards 2015 : « The trophy of Electro-Dance category » for Hak A Mama
- March 15, 2018 : TV fiction festival : « The Best Male Interpretation Award »

== Discography ==
=== K'lma Band ===
- Werda ala Werda
- Kif Lmaani
- Elghorba
- Fik Ana Nehia
- Law Kan Triko Hwah
- Mata Nastarih
- Nadem
- Tkellem

=== Singles ===
- Hak a Mama (2015)
- Makayen Bass (2016)
- Meftah Leqloub (2017)
- Memlook (2018)
- Ana Mellit (2018)
- Qolli Alash Kwitini (2019)
- Kif mana (2021)
- Qiluni (2024)

=== EP ===
- Axept EP (2018)
- Ghulam (2024)
