= Deux femmes sur la route =

- Directed by: Farida Bourquia
- Written by: Youssef Fadel
- Starring: Mouna Fettou, Mohamed Bastaoui, Aïcha Mahmah
- Cinematography: Kamal Derkaoui
- Edited by: Marcela Figueroa
- Music by: Younes Megri
- Production company: Espace Production
- Release date: 2007
- Running time: 90 minutes
- Country: Morocco
- Language: Moroccan Arabic

Deux femmes sur la route (English: Two Women On The Road) is a 2007 drama film directed by Farida Bourquia.

== Synopsis ==
Amina is trying to reach Tetouan where her husband has been arrested and imprisoned for drug trafficking. When her car breaks down, she meets Lalla Rahma, who is also trying to get to Tetouan in hopes of hoping to finding out what happened to her son, who left as a stowaway on a boat to Europe. Bound by their despair, the two women take the bus together.

== Cast ==
- Mouna Fettou
- Mohamed Bastaoui
- Aïcha Mahmah
- Mohamed Khouyi
