= Houda Rihani =

Moroccan actress

- Born: April 28, 1975 (age 51); Casablanca, Morocco
- Occupation: Actress
- Years active: 1996 - present

Houda Rihani (born April 28, 1975, in Casablanca) is a Moroccan actress. She started off her career with performances in theatre, before moving on to television roles and eventually to cinema. She is currently based in Montreal, but continues to star in Moroccan television shows and films. She has won multiple national awards for her performances.

== Partial filmography ==
- 1999 : Elle est diabétique, hypertendue et elle refuse de crever
- 2003 : Khahit errouh
- 2003 : Rahma
- 2003 : Face à face
- 2007 : The Bitter Orange
- 2011 : N8ar Tzad Tfa Dow
- 2011 : Ayadin Khachina
- 2015 : Aïda
