= Kaboul Kitchen =

French comedy television series

- Genre: Comedy
- Created by: Marc Victor; Allan Mauduit; Jean-Patrick Benes
- Starring: Gilbert Melki; Simon Abkarian; Stéphanie Pasterkamp
- Theme music composer: Christophe Julien
- Country of origin: France
- Original language: French
- No. of seasons: 3
- No. of episodes: 36

Production
- Executive producers: Joëy Faré; Marco Cherqui
- Running time: 30 minutes

Original release
- Network: Canal+
- Release: February 13, 2012 – present

Kaboul Kitchen is a French comedy television series broadcast by Canal+. It was created by Marc Victor, Allan Mauduit and Jean-Patrick Benes. The series is based on the true story of Radio France Internationale journalist Marc Victor, who ran a restaurant for French expatriates in Kabul until 2008. The first series premiered on February 15, 2012, on Canal+ and ended on March 5, 2012. It set a ratings record for comedy series in the primetime slot on Canal+. A second series of 12 episodes aired in France in 2014.

The series depicts the life of French expatriate Jacky who runs the popular restaurant Kaboul Kitchen in Kabul, Afghanistan. His daughter Sophie, who he has not seen in 20 years, arrives to do humanitarian work, while he is interested in keeping the restaurant afloat with challenges of local officials, Taliban neighbors, and more.

The series won two Golden FIPA Awards at the 2012 Festival International de Programmes Audiovisuels: one for Best TV Series and one for Best TV Screenplay. It was screened at MIPTV and named fourth on The Hollywood Reporter's list of "MIPTV A-List Projects" for the most promising series screened at the event.

== Cast ==
- Gilbert Melki as Jacky
- Stéphanie Pasterkamp as Sophie
- Benjamin Bellecour as Axel
- Alexis Michalik as Damien
- Simon Abkarian as Colonel Amanullah
- Marc Citti as Victor
- Braham Bihi as Sayed
- Nadia Niazi as Hamida
- Fayçal Azizi as Habib
- Fanny Touron as Camille
- Jonas Senhadji as Carl
- Lucia Sanchez as Rosemary
- Serge Dupire as Bob
- Louis-Do de Lencquesaing as Paul Braque
- Natacha Lindinger as Victoria (season 3)
- David Gasman as Harvey (season 2)

== Production ==
The series is loosely based on the real life experiences of journalist and co-creator of the series, Marc Victor. From 2003 to 2008, Victor ran a French restaurant for foreign NGO workers in Kabul. Although much in the series is for dramatic effect, a few incidents, such as a wealthy donor sending skis to Afghanistan, really happened.

Gilbert Melki was selected to play the mercenary Jacky as he had evenly divided his career between comedy and drama films, a quality creator Allan Mauduit found desirable. The series was filmed mainly in Casablanca, Morocco where the crew had to use dust machines to simulate the dusty conditions of Kabul. The actors studied Dari with language coaches.

A third season was broadcast in France in 2017.

A fourth season has been claimed to be in production.

== Episode list ==
=== Series 1 ===
No.	Title	Directed by	Original release date
1	"La fille à la grosse valise"	Jean-Patrick Benes	13 February 2012
Jacky's daughter arrives in Kabul. She wants to do humanitarian work, but he just wants her to leave.
2	"La piscine"	Jean-Patrick Benes	13 February 2012
Jacky runs into trouble when swimsuit-clad girls in his pool cause controversy.
3	"La panthère et l'imprimeur"	Jean-Patrick Benes	13 February 2012
Colonel Amanullah decides to help Jacky find a reliable liquor supplier, but he ends up causing more problems.
4	"Dollars et passion"	Unknown	20 February 2012
Jacky must pay his taxes, but quickly falls for the tax comptroller.
5	"Peur sur Kaboul"	Unknown	20 February 2012
Jacky hires guards to reassure his frightened patrons after two rockets fall on Kabul.
6	"Vices et versets"	Unknown	20 February 2012
Jacky is forced to hide Colonel Amanullah's mistress at the restaurant.
7	"Le départ de Sophie"	Unknown	27 February 2012
When Jacky gets a stomachache, he is convinced that he has cancer.
8	"Petits mensonges entre amis"	Unknown	27 February 2012
One of Jacky's old friends, a journalist, comes to Kabul to investigate the opium trade.
9	"Martine à Kaboul"	Unknown	27 February 2012
Jacky's ex-wife arrives in Kabul, demanding €60,000 in child support that he owes her.
10	"Crise de foi"	Unknown	5 March 2012
The restaurant's cook is unhappy with the pork and alcohol served at Kaboul Kitchen and decides to go on strike.
11	"Cool à Kaboul"	Unknown	5 March 2012
When riots break out in the city, Jacky must rescue Sophie, the restaurant and all of his patrons.
12	"Pas cool à Kaboul"	Unknown	5 March 2012
A pile of money vanishes and the Taliban show up.

=== Series 2 ===
No.	Title	Directed by	Original release date
13	"La peste et le Choléra"	Unknown	13 January 2014
14	"Mon nom est Robert, Jacky Robert"	Unknown	13 January 2014
15	"La Troisième Guerre du Golfe"	Unknown	13 January 2014
16	"Le Mac de Kaboul"	Unknown	20 January 2014
17	"Tirez pas sur le barman"	Unknown	20 January 2014
18	"L'Ex-femme de ma vie"	Unknown	20 January 2014
19	"Taupe Secret"	Unknown	27 January 2014
20	"Le Vestiaire de la peur"	Unknown	27 January 2014
21	"La Route de Jalalabad"	Unknown	27 January 2014
22	"L'Homme au pistolet de nacre"	Unknown	3 February 2014
23	"Le Traître, la Brute et le Fiancé"	Unknown	3 February 2014
24	"Jacky Unchained"	Unknown	3 February 2014

=== Series 3 ===
No.	Title	Directed by	Original release date
25	"Je suis Jacky"	Unknown	20 February 2017
26	"De Russes et des roses"	Unknown	20 February 2017
27	"Colonel Cash Cash"	Unknown	20 February 2017
28	"Des poussins et des hommes"	Unknown	27 February 2017
29	"Le Nez"	Unknown	27 February 2017
30	"Coup de bambou"	Unknown	27 February 2017
31	"Le Discours à I'ONU"	Unknown	6 March 2017
32	"Afghane Thérapie"	Unknown	6 March 2017
33	"Le Tonton Flingueur"	Unknown	6 March 2017
34	"Le Choix de Sophie"	Unknown	13 March 2017
35	"Le Choix de Sophie"	Unknown	13 March 2017
36	"Ainsi parlait Amanullah"	Unknown	13 March 2017
37	"Michel vaillant"	Unknown	13 March 2017

== Ratings ==
Episodes	Air date	Number of viewers
1, 2 and 3	February 13, 2012	940,000
10, 11 and 12	March 5, 2012	875 000

== Awards ==
- 2012 Golden FIPA Award for the Best TV Series at the Festival International de Programmes Audiovisuels
- 2012 Golden FIPA Award for the Best TV Screenplay at the Festival International de Programmes Audiovisuels
- 2014 Grand prize (Daesang) at the Seoul International Drama Awards
