= L'Maktoub =

Moroccan television series

- Genre: Drama
- Written by: Fatine Youssoufi
- Directed by: Alaa Akaaboune
- Starring: Amine Ennaji; Meryem Zaimi; Dounia Boutazout; Hind Ben Jebara; Salwa Zarhane; Rafik Boubker; Soukaina Darabil
- Country of origin: Morocco
- Original language: Arabic
- No. of seasons: 2
- No. of episodes: 60

Production
- Executive producers: Mouad Ghandi; Mohamed Jamai
- Producer: Connexion Media
- Production location: Rabat
- Cinematography: Othmane El Mansouri
- Running time: 40 minutes

Original release
- Network: 2M
- Release: 3 April 2022 – April 2023

L'Maktoub (English: Destiny) is a Moroccan drama television series written by Fatine Youssoufi and directed by Alaa Akaaboune. Season 1 of the drama was broadcast daily during Ramadan in April 2022, while Season 2 was aired in March and April 2023. L'Maktoub set new audience records and garnered the highest viewership figures ever recorded for a Moroccan television series.

== Premise ==
L'Maktoub narrates the tale of a Halima, a Moroccan cheikha (female dancer/performer) who raises her daughter (Hind) as a single mother. The daughter eventually marries a wealthy businessman (Omar) with two daughters from a previous marriage, who immediately express their disdain towards their new stepmother. In the second season, the story continues from the death of the businessman, and depicts the luxurious life of his wife and newborn child, and the ongoing conflict between the cheikha and his stepdaughters.

Through the character of the cheikha, the show addresses the issues of prejudice and social harassment that performers and their children face.

== Cast ==
- Amine Ennaji as Omar El Maataoui
- Meriem Zaimi as Batoul
- Dounia Boutazout as Halima
- Salwa Zarhane as Salima
- Hind Benjbara as Hind
- Rafik Boubker as Driss
- Soukaina Darabil as Fatima
- Rabii El Kati
- Hind Saâdidi
- Ouenza
- Anas El Hamdouchi
- Ayoub Gritaa
- Khadija Zeroual

== Production ==
Before being accepted by 2M, L'Maktoub was rejected by the state broadcasting service twice as Youssoufi lacked the authorization to reproduce the storyline, which could have potentially resulted in copyright issues.

L'Maktoub was filmed in Rabat.

== Viewership and reception ==
L'Maktoub became the most watched series in the history of Moroccan television in 2022. The series, produced by 2M, Morocco's leading television channel recorded an audience of over 9.63 million viewers for the eighth episode of Season 1. The show recorded 8 million viewers of the first episode of Season 2, achieving a 52% share of viewership, indicating that half of the Moroccan audience watching TV after iftar were watching the 2M channel. On YouTube, episodes reached a million views within hours of being uploaded.

Controversy was sparked by a video published by Salafist preacher Yassine El Amri, who accused 2M of normalizing the profession of a cheikha. El Amri called such female performers depraved and unworthy of respect, and argued that they should not be portrayed positively or neutrally on television. He also argued that the holy month of Ramadan should not be "profaned" by the broadcast of such programs. His comments prompted a strong response from supporters of the show and the actress who played the cheikha, Dounia Boutazout. They argued that the portrayal of the cheikha was a positive and realistic representation of a strong and successful woman and that the cheikha was an integral part of Moroccan culture and heritage.
