= A Muslim Childhood =

- El Ayel
- Directed by: Moumen Smihi
- Written by: Moumen Smihi
- Starring: Said Amel, Khouloud, Bahija Hachami
- Cinematography: Robert Alazraki, Thierry Lebigre, Abbdelkrim Derkaoui
- Edited by: Ody Ross, Moumen Smihi
- Music by: Abdesslam Begdouri
- Production company: Imago Film International
- Release date: 2005
- Running time: 90 minutes
- Country: Morocco
- Language: Moroccan Arabic

A Muslim Childhood (Moroccan Arabic title: El Ayel, French title: Le gosse de Tanger) is a 2005 Moroccan film directed by Moumen Smihi. It was screened at the Marrakesh International Film Festival.

== Synopsis ==
Part of a loose autobiographical trilogy, the film, shot in Smihi's hometown of Tangier, is a reminiscence of the past. It chronicles the childhood of Larbi Salmi, a reckless and confused 10 year old.

== Cast ==
- Abdesslam Begdouri as Mohamed Larbi Salmi
- Saïd Amel as Sidi Ahmed Salmi
- Bahija El Hachami as Lalla Alia
- Khouloud as Aouicha
- Rim Taoud as Khadija
- Nadia Alami as Chems Doha
- Issam Fiyache as Khalil
- Salma El Aouni as the grandmother
- Abdel Majid Haddad as the schoolteacher
