= Abdelkader Moutaa =

Moroccan actor (1940–2025)

- عبد القادر مطاع
- Born: 1940; Derb Sultan, Casablanca, Morocco
- Died: 21 October 2025 (aged 85); Casablanca, Morocco
- Occupation: Actor
- Years active: 1968–2025
- Notable work: Wechma

Abdelkader Moutaa (Arabic: عبد القادر مطاع; 1940 – 21 October 2025) was a Moroccan actor known for his contributions to the Moroccan film and television industry.

== Life and career ==
Abdelkader Moutaa was born and grew up in the Derb Sultan neighborhood of Casablanca in 1940. His challenging childhood, marked by the early loss of his father, led him to leave school early and engage in various jobs, including carpentry, bicycle repair, and working in a salt mill.

His introduction to the world of acting came through scouting activities. His first direct encounter with acting was in the play "Al-Sahafa Al-Mazoura". Despite initial challenges, Moutaa continued to pursue his artistic aspirations.

Moutaa participated in numerous television and film productions. His notable works include the film Washma (1970).

Moutaa died in Casablanca on 21 October 2025, at the age of 85.

== Filmography ==
=== Feature films ===
- Wechma (1970)
- El Chergui (1975)
- The Bandits (2003)
- Rbib (2004)
- The Man Who Sold the World (2008)
