= The Barber of the Poor District =

- Directed by: Mohamed Reggab
- Story by: Youssef Fadel
- Produced by: Omar Akouri
- Starring: Mohamed Habachi, Khadija Khammouli, Hamid Hajah
- Cinematography: Mohamed Reggab
- Edited by: Mohamed Reggab
- Production company: Reggab Films
- Release date: 1982
- Running time: 110 minutes
- Country: Morocco
- Language: Moroccan Arabic

The Barber of the Poor District (Arabic: حلاق درب الفقراء, French: Le coiffeur du quartier des pauvres) is a 1982 Moroccan film directed by Mohamed Reggab and adapted from a play of the same title by Youssef Fadel. It was the director's sole feature film, and became a Moroccan cult classic. It was screened at the first edition of the National Film Festival in Rabat, where it received as a special mention and the 10th edition of the National Film Festival (December 13–20, 2008 in Tangier) as part of a series on Moroccan classics. Internationally, the film was screened at Three Continents Festival in 1983, and the Berlin International Film Festival in 1982. The debts incurred for the production of his sole feature film led to Reggab being imprisoned.

== Synopsis ==
Miloud is a hairdresser in Derb Sultan, an old working-class neighborhood in Casablanca. His friend Hmida has been hit hard by fate. He is rural migrant who arrived in the city after being disowned by his father. Since then, he has been living on petty theft, which has already earned him a prison sentence. Hmida is unemployed but spirited, while Miloud is nervous and desperate about his friend's illicit activities. When a wealthy entrepreneur who rules the neighborhood manages to evict the barber and his wife from their salon to build a Quranic school, Hmida urges his friend to react.

== Cast ==
- Mohamed El Habachi
- Khadija Khammouli
- Hamid Hajah
- Omar Chenbout
