= Younes Reggab =

Moroccan filmmaker and screenwriter

- Born: 1975 (age 50–51)
- Occupations: filmmaker and screenwriter.
- Notable work: Cigarette
- Father: Mohamed Reggab

Younes Reggab (born 1975) is a Moroccan filmmaker and screenwriter. He is the son of filmmaker Mohamed Reggab. His films have been screened at numerous Moroccan film festivals and he has been a part of the juries of a number of them.

== Filmography ==
=== Feature films ===
- 2014: Feuilles mortes (Dead Leaves)

=== Short films ===
- 2003: Khouya (My Brother)
- 2006: Cigarette
- 2006: Caen et Abel (Cain and Abel)
- 2006: Imprévue (Unforeseen)
- 2006: Nuit d'enfer (Night of Hell)
- 2008: Minuit (Midnight)
- 2010: Statue
