= Ali Essafi =

- Born: 1963 (age 62–63); Morocco
- Occupations: film director, screenwriter, film producer, and cinematographer
- Notable work: Before the Dying of the Light

Ali Essafi (Arabic: علي الصافي; 1963 -) is a Moroccan film director, screenwriter, film producer, and cinematographer.

== Biography ==
Ali Essafi was born in Morocco in 1963. He studied psychology in France before delving into film creation.

== Films ==
=== Before the Dying of the Light ===
Before the Dying of the Light is a feature-length documentary directed by Essafi about art and culture in Morocco in the 1970s, before it was suppressed by Hassan II. It focuses on Mostafa Derkaoui's film About Some Meaningless Events. Before the Dying of the Light was shown at the Museum of Modern Art's 2021 Doc Fortnight festival.
