= The Violent Silence =

- El Chergui (The East Wind)
- Directed by: Moumen Smihi
- Written by: Moumen Smihi
- Produced by: Mohamed Torres, Mohamed Tazi
- Starring: Leila Chenna, Abdelkader Moutaa, Chawki Sail
- Cinematography: Mohamed Sekkat
- Edited by: Claude Farory
- Production companies: Aliph Film, CCM
- Release date: 1975
- Running time: 80 minutes
- Country: Morocco
- Language: Moroccan Arabic

The Violent Silence (Moroccan Arabic: El Chergui, French: Le Silence violent) is a 1975 film directed by Moumen Smihi. The film was screened at multiple international festivals and was a critical success.

== Synopsis ==
Set in Tangier on the cusp of Moroccan independence, Aisha, a young woman, uses magical practices to prevent her husband from marrying a second wife. During a final ritual, she drowns.

== Cast ==
- Leila Shenna
- Abdelkader Moutaa
- Chawki Sail
- Khadija Moujahid
- Aïcha Chairi

== Festival and awards ==
- 1976 International Film Festival Rotterdam
- Festival de Toulon: Grand Prix, Critic's Award
