= I Saw Ben Barka Get Killed =

- Directed by: Serge Le Péron; Saïd Smihi
- Written by: Serge Le Péron; Saïd Smihi; Frédérique Moreau
- Produced by: Gilles Sandoz; Abdelhai Laraki; Paco Poch; Saïd Smihi
- Starring: Charles Berling; Simon Abkarian; Josiane Balasko; Jean-Pierre Léaud; Mathieu Amalric
- Cinematography: Christophe Pollock
- Edited by: Janice Jones
- Music by: Joan Albert Amargós; Pierre-Alexandre Mati
- Production company: A2L Production Films
- Distributed by: Rézo Films
- Release date: 2 November 2005
- Running time: 101 minutes
- Country: France
- Language: French
- Budget: $3.8 million
- Box office: $192.000

I Saw Ben Barka Get Killed (French: J'ai vu tuer Ben Barka) is a 2005 French-Moroccan film drama directed by Serge Le Péron and Saïd Smihi. The film is based on the Ben Barka affair.

== Plot ==
In a Parisian apartment, police discover the body of Georges Figon, the man who broke the scandal of the Ben Barka affair, and undermined Gaullist power. A year earlier, Figon, tired of dubious deals and petty scams, is looking for a lucrative job. Close to the "milieu" (the criminal underworld) since his years in prison, he is given a big assignment: to produce a documentary about decolonization, written by Marguerite Duras and directed by Georges Franju, with the help of famous Moroccan dissident, Mehdi Ben Barka, who has been hired as an historical consultant. The film project is a trap.

== Cast ==
- Charles Berling as Georges Figon
- Simon Abkarian as Mehdi Ben Barka
- Josiane Balasko as Marguerite Duras
- Jean-Pierre Léaud as Georges Franju
- Mathieu Amalric as Philippe Bernier
- Fabienne Babe as Anne-Marie Coffinet
- Azize Kabouche as Chtouki
- François Hadji-Lazaro as Le Ny
- Jean-Marie Winling as Pierre Lemarchand
- Franck Tiozzo as Georges Boucheseiche
- Jo Prestia as Dubail
- José María Blanco as The judge
- Georges Bigot as Inspector Louis Souchon
- Rony Kramer as Lopez
- Xavier Serrat as Voitot
- Brahim Aït El Kadi as Thami Azzemouri
- Mouna Fettou as Ghita Ben Barka
- Fayçal Khyari as Mohamed Oufkir
- Abdellatif Khamolli as Ahmed Dlimi
- Hubert Saint-Macary as The doctor
