= Saâd Chraïbi =

Moroccan director and screenwriter

- Born: 27 July 1952 (age 73); Fez
- Citizenship: Morocco
- Occupations: Film director, Screenwriter

Saâd Chraïbi (Arabic: سعد الشرايبي ) is a Moroccan director and screenwriter.

He has made numerous films revolving around Moroccan society and history, particularly the colonial period and Years of Lead, but also the status of Moroccan women. An activist and intellectual, he has written numerous articles and participated in multiple worldwide film events. He is involved in directing, screenwriting and production management.

== Biography ==
Chraïbi was born on July 27, 1952, in Fez, Morocco to Bensalem Ben Abdelkarim and Rqia Bent Abdelkader. He studied medicine for two years (1968–1970) at the Faculty of Medicine in Casablanca before spending a year at the University of Fancine (France), majoring in communication. He is the brother of Omar Chraïbi.

In the 1970s, he joined the National Federation of Film Clubs of Morocco. In 1976, he took part in the production of the collective film Cinders of the Vineyard alongside Abdelkader Lagtaâ et Abdelkarim Derkaoui.

In 1990, he directed his first feature film, "Chronicle of a Normal Life", followed in 2000 by his film Soif which evokes the colonial past of Morocco. In 1998, Chraïbi inaugurated a trilogy devoted to the condition of Moroccan women by making the film Femmes... et Femmes, which was followed by Jawhara and Femmes en Miroires. Eight years later, in 2019, he would release another feature film Les 3M Histoire Inachevée.

He was married to Mouna Fettou, the star of his film Femmes... et Femmes.

== Filmography ==
1978	La vie d'une village (documentary)
1982	Ghiab (Absence)
1991	Chronique d'une Vie Normale (Chronicle of a Normal Life)
1999	Femmes... et Femmes
2000	Soif (Thirst)
2003	Jawhara
2007	Islamour
2011	Femmes en Miroires (Women In Mirrors)
2018	Les 3M Histoire Inachevée

== Bibliography ==
- L'expérience cinématographique de Saad Chraïbi (2004), Tanger : Association des critiques de cinéma au Maroc, 2004
