= Youssef El Joundi =

Moroccan actor

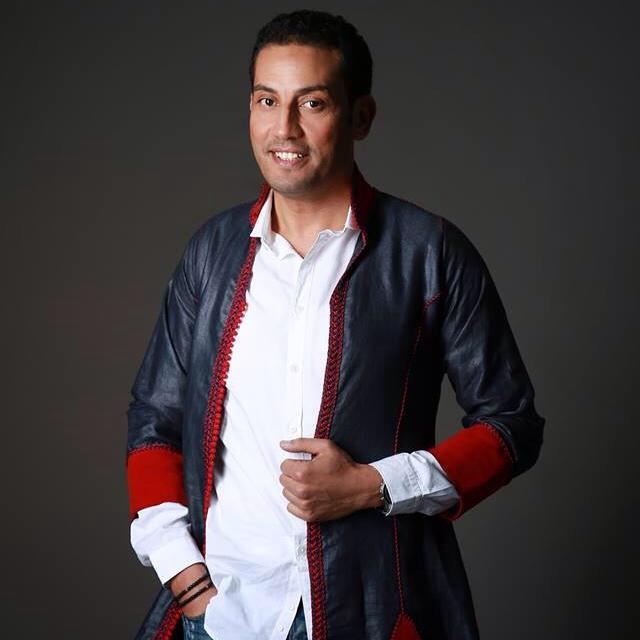
- Born: July 1, 1987 (age 38); Casablanca, Morocco
- Occupation: Actor
- Years active: 2011 - present
- Spouse: Houria Boutayeb

Youssef Joundy (also spelled Youssef El Joundy, Arabic: يوسف الجندي) is a Moroccan actor.

== Personal life ==
Joundy is married to journalist Houria Boutayeb.

== Partial filmography ==
=== Films ===
- Makanch 3la bal
- Des amis du Canada
- The Bitter Orange
- Les oubliés de l'histoire (2010)

=== Television ===
- Sla w Slam (2020)
