= Oubeid Allah Hlal =

Moroccan artist and cardiologist

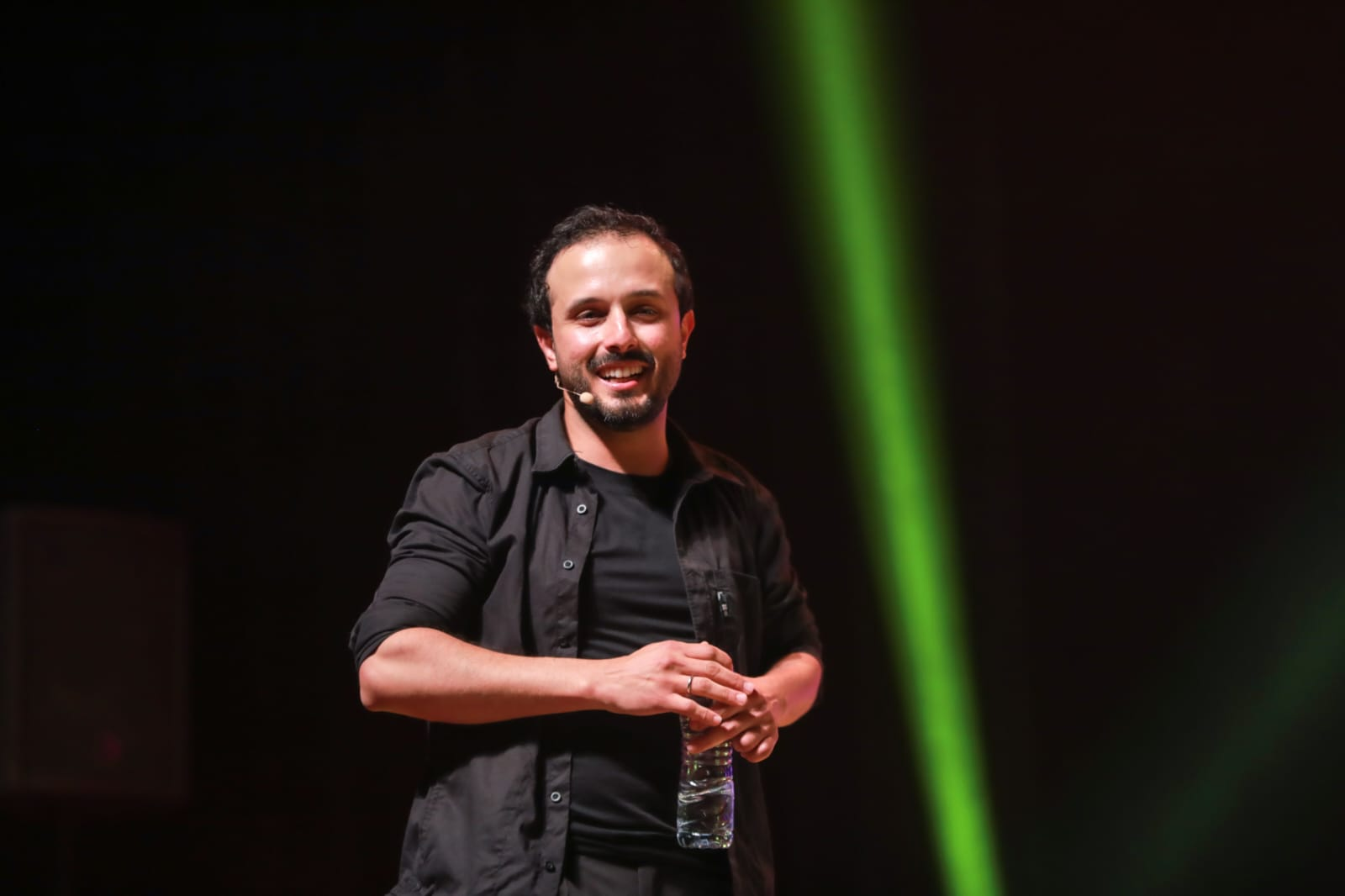
- Oubeid Allah Hlal at the 2023 Aji Tehdem Festival
- Born: 26 May 1990 (age 35); Rabat
- Website: https://droubeidallah.com/

Oubeid Allah Hlal or Oubeid, born May 26, 1990 in Rabat, is a Moroccan comedian, content creator, producer and cardiologist. He is a member of the comedian duo Les inqualifiables

== Biography ==
Originally from a family from Beni Znassen (Oujda), he succeeded in obtaining his baccalaureate in 2008. He, then, decided to study medicine at Mohamed V University in Rabat. In 2021, he obtained his specialty diploma in cardiology.

Oubeid Allah Hlal also has an inter-university diploma in prevention, cardiac rehabilitation and therapeutic education from the University of Tours, an inter-university diploma in cardiac ultrasound from the Faculty of Medicine of Bordeaux and a university diploma in multi-modality cardiovascular imaging from the Paris Diderot University.

== Career ==
From a young age, he shared with his childhood friend Amine Belghazi the dream of going on stage and making people laugh.

The school where Amine studied has decided to organize a show for young talents and offers to grant a passage of 15 minutes. Amine and Oubeid then put together a show in two days and received positive feedback.

In 2014, they decided to form a comedian duo called “Les inqualifiables”. Qui-es tu? was their first show.

Oubeid shares, since 2017, informative content with his social media followers. During the COVID-19 pandemic, he published a viral video showing the extent of the effects of the virus and encouraging citizens to respect health measures.

== Shiha Labass ==
During Ramadan 2023, Oubeid Allah Hlal hosts "Shiha Labass", a TV program broadcast daily on Al Aoula. The program deals with health topics in a fun way, while giving important information on diseases and means of prevention. Oubeid Allah Hlal uses humor as an effective means of conveying messages to Moroccan audiences, and viewers appreciate this original and entertaining approach

In a statement given to SNRTnews, Oubeid Hlal said: "I presented my capsule project to the Al Aoula channel because I wanted my content to reach all Moroccans. I was surprised by the positive feedback from the from those in charge of the projects within the National Radio and Television Company. Through "Shiha Labass", I wanted to present a different image than that of a cardiologist. I consider this project as a dream that I live with love, and I hope the public will warmly accept it when it airs during the holy month of Ramadan."

The show is a great success, exceeding 4 million views for each episode.
