= Fabula =

Fabula may refer to:

- Fabula, Latin word for a fable
- Fabula, Latin word for a play (see Theatre of ancient Rome)
  - Fabula atellana, Attelan farce
  - Fabula palliata, Roman comedy in a Greek setting
  - Fabula togata, Roman comedy in a Roman setting
  - Fabula crepidata, Roman tragedy in a Greek setting
  - Fabula praetexta, Roman tragedy in a Roman setting
  - Fabula saltata, Roman pantomime (dancer accompanied by song)
- Fabula, Law Latin for a contract or covenant
- Fabula and syuzhet, terms in Russian formalism
- Fabula (moth), genus of moths
- Fabula Award, Slovenian literary award
- Fabula (journal), a multilingual journal in folkloristics
- Fabula (2025 film), a co-production of Netherlands, Belgium, Germany, Dark Comedy
