= Hanane el-Fadili =

Moroccan actress (born 1974)

- حنان الفاضلي
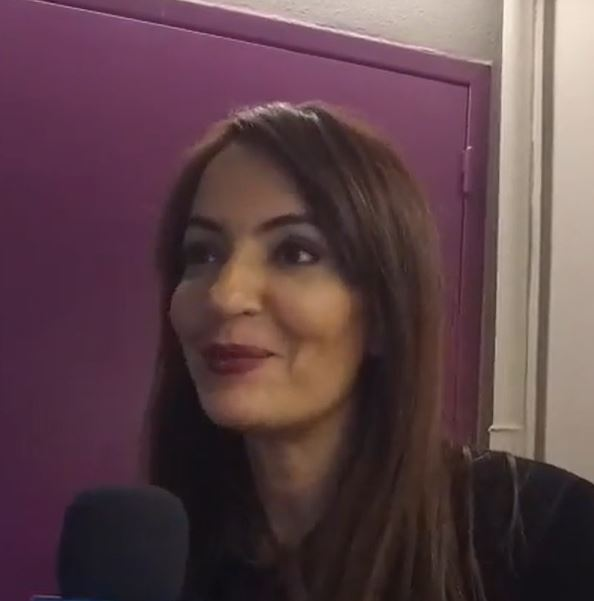
- Born: May 2, 1974 (age 52); Casablanca, Morocco
- Citizenship: Morocco
- Occupations: Actress, comedian
- Father: Aziz el-Fadili
- Relatives: Adil el-Fadili

Hanane el-Fadili (Arabic: حنان الفاضلي) is a Moroccan actress and comedian. She was born on May 2, 1974, in Casablanca, Morocco. She specializes in parody, focusing on famous personalities and controversial figures. She addresses social and political issues relevant to Moroccan public opinion.

== Personal life ==
She's from a family of actors; her father is the actor Aziz el-Fadili and her brother is the producer Adil el-Fadili.

== Career ==
She has made a number of productions including programs such as Hanane Show and Super Hada, which were well received by Moroccan audiences. She also created Hanane Net, which was a series of short comedy videos produced by her brother Adil in 2017.

She produced Bnat Si Taher, which is another series that was aired on Ramadan in 2022.

She was appointed UNICEF's goodwill ambassador to Morocco in 2010.

== Shows ==
- Bergaga
- SuperHadda
- Fatna Zerda

== TV series ==
- Hanane Show
