= Al-Jamra =

- Directed by: Farida Bourquia
- Written by: Mahmoud Migri
- Produced by: Farida Bourquia, Mohammed Ismail
- Starring: Hamid Zoughi, Rachida Machnouaa, Mostapha Zaari
- Cinematography: Houcine El Khattabi
- Edited by: Larbi Ben Zouina
- Music by: Abdelghani Al Yousfi
- Release date: 1982
- Running time: 104 minutes
- Country: Morocco

Al-Jamra or La braise (English: The Embers, also known as Nights of Fire) is a 1982 Moroccan film directed by Farida Bourquia in her directorial debut. It was one of only two feature films made in Morocco by female directors in the 1980s, and is considered to be one of the first Moroccan feature films directed by a woman.

== Synopsis ==
In a mountain village, a father is accused of having raped and killed a local young woman. He is lynched by the villagers, and his wife dies tragically. They leave behind three persecuted children — Ali, Maryem, and Brahim — who attempt to uncover the perpetrator of the crime of which their father had been wrongly accused.
