= Bouchra Ijork =

Moroccan filmmaker

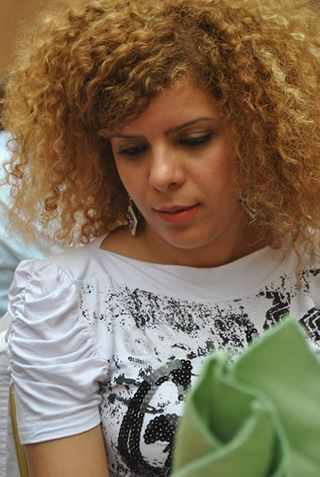
- Bouchra Ijork in 2015
- Born: October 28, 1976 (age 49); Casablanca, Morocco
- Occupations: Filmmaker; screenwriter; actress
- Years active: 2003 - present

Bouchra Ijork (born 1976 in Casablanca) is a Moroccan filmmaker, screenwriter, dramatist and actress. She studied dramatic arts in Morocco, graduating from the ISADAC in 1998. She then had a brief stint playing a few roles in theater and television. In 2003, she attended the summer university programme at La Fémis in Paris.

== Works ==
=== Filmography (as director) ===
==== Television films ====
- 2007: The Bitter Orange
- 2004: Al Bahja

==== Short films ====
- 2004: Karawane, The Lebanese Bird

=== Theater ===
- 1996: Parlons de la mort
- 1998: Le pain nu
