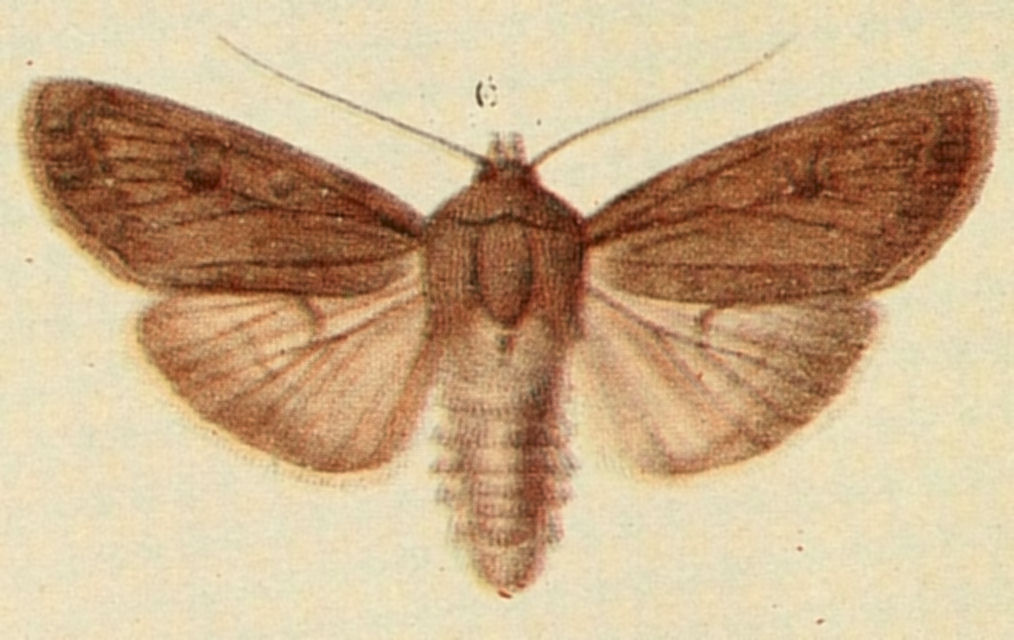

Scientific classification
- Kingdom: Animalia
- Phylum: Arthropoda
- Clade: Pancrustacea
- Class: Insecta
- Order: Lepidoptera
- Superfamily: Noctuoidea
- Family: Noctuidae
- Genus: Fabula
- Species: F. zollikoferi

Binomial name
- Fabula zollikoferi (Freyer, 1836)

Synonyms
- Nonagria zollikoferi Freyer, 1836; Sidemia zollicoferi Hampson, 1908 f. internigrata (Warren, 1911); Xylophasia zollikoferi Luperina zollikoferi

= Fabula zollikoferi =

Species of moth

The Scarce Arches (Fabula zollikoferi) is a moth of the family Noctuidae and the only member of the genus Fabula. It is found in central and eastern Europe and in southern Scandinavia. north Germany, Russia including the Ural Mountains, west and east Turkestan. It is not known to breed in Britain, occurring only as a migrant.

== Technical description and variation ==
S. zollikoferi Frr. (41 h). Forewing dingy greyish ochreous, dusted with dark grey, especially in the male; lines hardly visible; the outer indicated by slight dark and pale dashes on veins; the submarginal paler with grey edges, the terminal area faintly darker beyond it; orbicular and reniform with faint pale annuli and grey scaling; hindwing dull whitish, tinged with brownish grey along termen; — ab. internigrata ab. nov. (= ab. 1. Hmps.) [from the Ural Mts.] (41 h), shows the lines and markings clearly, being suffused with blackish between the subcostal vein and submedian fold to outer line and more densely before and beyond submarginal line, the veins all being of the pale ground colour; the wedge-shaped marks before submarginal line, except between veins 6 and 7, black; stigmata paler and plainer; a slight trace of a dark-edged claviform; hindwing whiter, with dark fuscous terminal border and black terminal line. Larva green, feeding on low growing mountain plants. The wingspan is 45–52 mm.

== Biology ==
The moth flies in September and October.

The larvae feed on Common Meadow-rue, Lesser Meadow-rue and Great Fen-sedge.
