= Cinema Rialto =

Movie theater in Casablanca, Morocco

Coordinates: 33.5941°N 7.6144°W

- سينما ريالطو
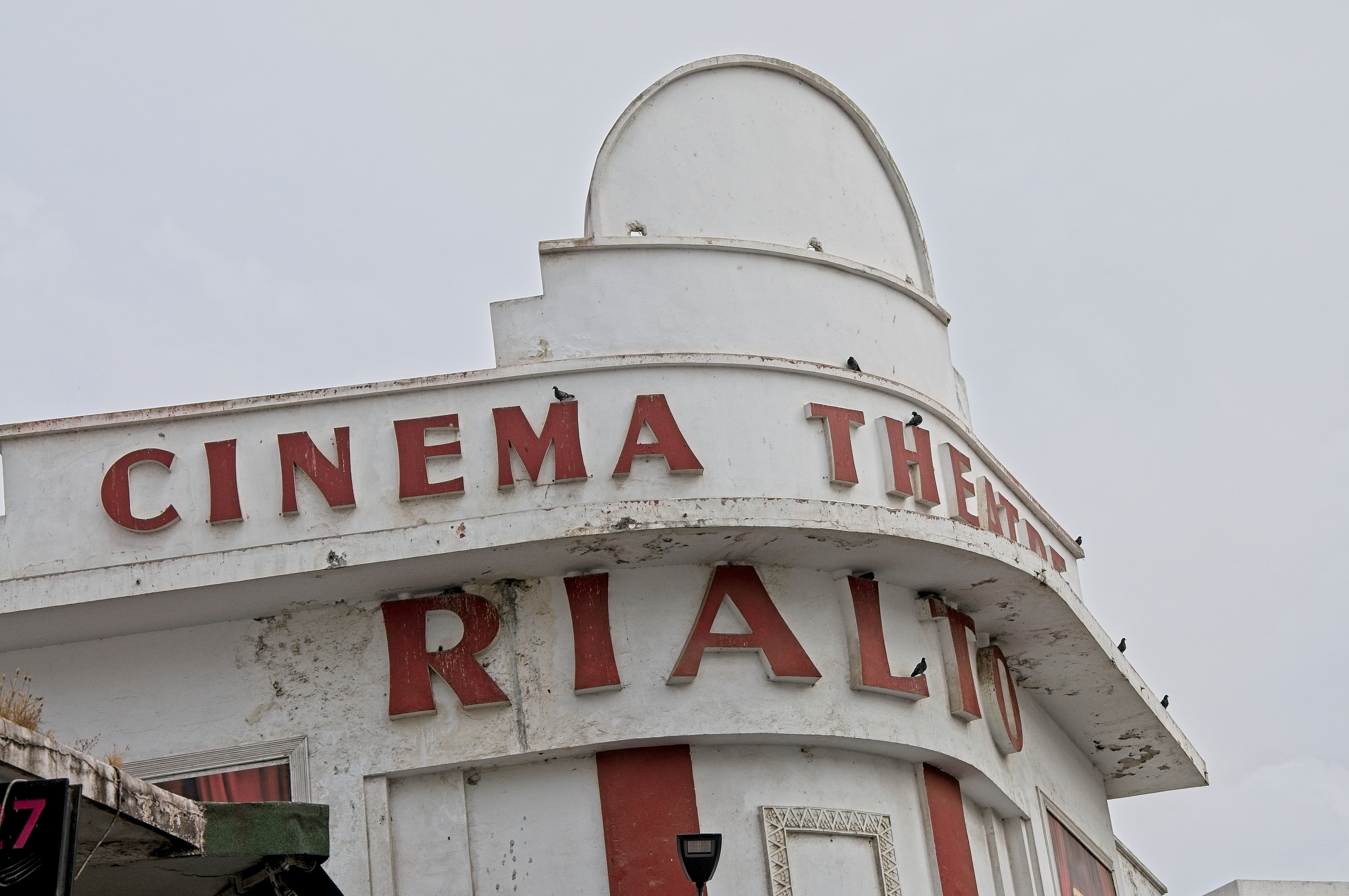
- Facade of Cinema Rialto, 19 July 2026
- Interactive map of the Cinema Rialto area
- Etymology: The Rialto is a neighborhood and market in Venice.

General information
- Architectural style: Art Deco
- Location: Casablanca, Morocco, 35 Mohammed El Qori Street
- Completed: 1929

Design and construction
- Architect: Pierre Jabin

Cinema Rialto (Arabic: سينما ريالطو) is a movie theater built in 1929 in Casablanca, Morocco. It is one of the oldest cinemas in Morocco.

== History ==
Construction was completed in 1929 according to the designs of the French architect Pierre Jabin. It was designed to seat 1,350 spectators.

Cinema Rialto is symbolic of a time when Casablanca was shaped by a culture of entertainment and recreation. The cinema hosted the premiers of international films and as well as performers such as Édith Piaf, Charles Aznavour, Dizzy Gillespie and others. In 1943, the American entertainer Josephine Baker even performed at the Rialto for American soldiers stationed in Morocco after Operation Torch in World War II.

Movie theaters became less important with the spread of technology allowing people to watch movies at home for cheaper, but Cinema Rialto still attracts visitors and tourists.

Cinema Rialto was operated and owned by the Bouchentouf family since the 1950s, and was open until 2019. Specifically the movie theater was acquired by Belyout Bouchentouf.

== Architecture ==
Cinema Rialto is considered a monument of the Art Deco architecture for which Casablanca is famous, and for that reason it still draws visitors. The cinema holds 1300 seats, of which 400 are on the characteristic mezzanine level. Despite the many renovations over the years, the building's architectural style is still considered entirely Art Deco.
