= Dounia Boutazout =

Moroccan actress (born 1981)

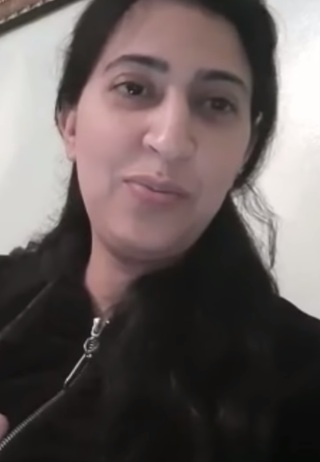
- Dounia Boutazout, January 2021
- Born: June 13, 1981 (age 45); Casablanca, Morocco
- Occupation: actress

Dounia Boutazout (born 13 June 1981) is a Moroccan actress. She has had lead roles in TV shows such as Chanily tv ,L'Couple, Nayda f’douar, F'Salon, and L'Maktoub.

== Filmography ==
=== Cinema ===
- Hadda and Krimo (2024)

=== Television ===
- Chanily tv (2005)
- Une Heure En Nefer (2011)
- Bnat AlAssas (2021)
- L'Maktoub (2022-2023)
- 2 Wjouh (2024)
