= Moumen Smihi =

Moroccan filmmaker (born 1945)

- Born: 1945 (age 80–81); Tangier, Morocco
- Occupations: Film director; Producer; screenwriter
- Notable work: Si Moh, pas de chance

Moumen Smihi (born 1945 in Tangier) is a Moroccan filmmaker. His career spans more than four decades, during which he has written, produced and directed award-winning and influential feature films, short films and documentaries. He is considered to be a seminal member of the "new Arab cinema", which began to flourish in the 1970s. Its proponents, inspired by political and artistic concerns, and similar to Italy's New Realism, France's Nouvelle Vague, and the US independent and underground movements, worked outside of the studio systems of Hollywood and Egypt, where business incentives dictated form and content.

Smihi has taught and lectured at Paris 8 University and at UCLA's Center for Near Eastern Studies. He has traveled extensively in Greece, France, Italy and in the Middle East, and has lived and worked in Egypt. Today, he divides his time between Tangier and Paris. His production company, IMAGO Film International, founded in 1979, has produced some twenty films and edited books on film theory.

== Early life ==
As World War II was drawing to a close, Smihi was born into a religious Muslim family living in the cosmopolis of Tangier. The city, which from 1923 had the status of an "International zone" governed by France, Spain and Great Britain (with the addition of Italy in 1926), was about to undergo a process of restoration to full sovereignty that, after a period of Spanish control from 1940 to 1945 during World War II, culminated in 1956 with the signing of the Tangier Protocol.

Although the men of Smihi's family had for generations been fquihs (Muslim ministers), Smihi's father insisted that his son attend a French secular school that was conducted in both French and Arabic. The Tangier of Smihi's childhood was home to some prominent Beat Generation writers and expats. Paul Bowles, William S. Burroughs and Allen Ginsberg lived there and could often be found drinking mint tea and smoking kif (Moroccan marijuana) in the Zocco Chico square. They nurtured local artists such as Mohamed Choukri and Mohamed Mrabet, whose Big Mirror was later adapted by Smihi, with a screenplay by Paul Bowles, Gavin Lambert and Smihi. Egyptian, American and Spanish films were widely shown at the time and Smihi was a fervent moviegoer.

At the same time, Smihi was becoming profoundly influenced by Marxist theory. His friendship and discussions with prominent Moroccan Marxists lead him to a deeply felt and abiding desire to articulate cultural concerns and their political expression in his films. In 1964, he took part in the political student uprising in Rabat that was ferociously repressed by the Moroccan police and army.

== Career ==
In 1965, Smihi was awarded a scholarship by the French government and left Morocco for Paris to study filmmaking at IDHEC (Institut des Hautes Etudes Cinématographiques). He was influenced by the seminars of Jacques Lacan, Michel Foucault and Claude Lévy-Strauss at the Ecole Pratique des Hautes Etudes en Sciences Sociales, and particularly by Roland Barthes, with whom he worked on a memoir.

Smihi has cited the cinéma vérité pioneer Jean Rouch and Henri Langlois of the Cinémathèque Française, whom he met at the Francophone Film Festival, as being among those who imparted to him a sense of the magic of movies.

Paris was undergoing its own "revolution" in 1968 which further fueled Smihi's imaginings of an Arab "patria grande". A constant in his work is an emphasis on the interrelationships between his fictional characters, the Arab culture and its history — which Smihi views critically as permeated with decadence and colonial influence.

His first short film, Si Moh Pas de Chance (The Unlucky Man) portrayed the miserable conditions of North African immigrant workers in Europe. It was shot in France and won the Grand Prize at the Festival International d'Expression Française in Dinard (1971). This film, along with Wechma by his friend Hamid Benani, was presented at the Swiss Film Archive by Freddy Buache, who praised them as heralding "the birth of Moroccan cinema."

It was in Morocco in 1975 that Smihi produced and directed his prize-winning first feature El Chergui (The East Wind), which was highly regarded in Europe and Africa and received enthusiastic reviews in Le Nouvel Observateur, Jeune Afrique, The International Herald Tribune^{2} and elsewhere. Also titled The Violent Silence, the film uses the story of a woman threatened by her polygamist husband to speak of a repressed and silenced Morocco.

His second feature, The Tales of the Night, won the Venezia Genti Prize at the Mostra of Venezia in 1985.^{3} Here, Smihi's filmmaking language is manifest: weaving together while teasing apart the threads of realism, poetry and the principles of "text theory"; a refusal of the structures of "ideological discourse", thus allowing the strength and the independence of the esthetic material to emerge.^{4}

In the 1980s, Smihi began to seek French and international co-productions resulting in French television companies producing a number of his films. During this period, he traveled widely in Greece, France, Italy and the Middle East presenting his films at festivals. He also became interested in psychoanalytic theory which began to influence his work.

In 1987, he made The Big Mirror, which portrayed both the rise of the middle class in Morocco and the delirium generated by King Hassan's censorship, under which filmmakers were obliged to use a language replete with oblique references and hidden meanings.^{5}

In 1988 Smihi moved to Cairo where, through the director Salah Abu Seif, he met Naguib Mahfouz, with whom he planned an adaptation of Mahfouz's novel Autumn Quail. During this period, Smihi directed two films in three years, Defending the Egyptian Cinema and The Lady from Cairo, the latter, the story of a woman who wants to be free and modern in an Egypt overwhelmed by terrorism.

In 1993 Smihi narrated, appeared and directed the documentary, With Matisse in Tangier which chronicles Henri Matisse's work and its relationship to Morocco.

For the past ten years Smihi has been working on an autobiography from which he adapted the screenplays of his last two features, A Muslim Childhood in 2005 (nominated at the Fifth Marrakech International Film Festival) and Of Virgins And Swallows (2008) both about his native Tangier.

In the documentary With Taha Hussein (2015), Smihi pays homage to the work of the Egyptian writer recounting Hussein's importance to Arab culture.

== Selected filmography ==
Year	Title	English Title	Credited as			Notes
Year	Title	English Title	Director	Screenwriter	Producer	Notes
1970	Si Moh, pas de chance	Simoh, the Unlucky Man	Yes	Yes	No	Short film
1972	Couleurs aux corps	Colours of the Body	Yes	Yes	No	Short documentary
1975	El Chergui ou le Silence vilent (Charqi Aw al-Çoumt al-‘Anif )	El Chergui/The Violent Silence/The East Wind	Yes	Yes	No	
1981	Quarante-quatre ou les récits de la nuit	Forty-Four or Tales of the Night	Yes	Yes	No	short film
1987	Caftan d’amour (Qaftan al-Hubb)	The Big Mirror	Yes	Yes	Yes	
1991	Sayidat al-Qahira /La dame du Caire	The Lady from Cairo	Yes	Yes	Yes	Co-written with Bashir El Deek
1989	al-Sinima al-Misriya (Défense et illustration du cinéma égyptien)	Defending the Egyptian Cinema	Yes	No	No	Television documentary
1993	Avec Matisse à Tanger	With Matisse in Tangier	Yes	Yes	No	Television documentary
1999	Waqa’i maghribia/Chroniques marocaines	Moroccan Chronicles	Yes	Yes	Yes	
2005	El ayel	A Muslim Childhood	Yes	Yes	No	
2008	Les Hirondelles: les Cris de jeunes filles des hirondelles	Girls and Swallows	Yes	Yes	No	
2012	Tanjaoui	The Sorrows of a Young Tangerian	Yes	Yes	No	
