= Mohamed Reggab =

Moroccan film director

- Born: 1942; Safi, Morocco
- Died: 1990 (aged 47–48); Paris, France
- Education: Université libre de Bruxelles; All-Russian State University of Cinematography; École Supérieure Louis Lumière
- Occupation: Film director
- Children: Younes Reggab

Mohamed Reggab (1942–1990) was a Moroccan film director.

== Biography ==
He was born in Safi, Morocco and studied in France (École Supérieure Louis Lumière), Russia (All-Russian State University of Cinematography), Belgium (Université libre de Bruxelles) and Germany. He is best known for his sole feature film The Barber of the Poor Quarter, based on a play by Youssef Fadel. The personal debts incurred in the making of this film resulted in his spending some time in prison. He also took part in the collectively made Cinders of the Vineyard (1979).

He died in Paris while preparing to make his second feature Mémoires d'exil. He is the father of the filmmaker Younes Reggab.
