= Face to Face (2003 film) =

- Directed by: Abdelkader Lagtaâ
- Written by: Noureddine Saïl
- Starring: Sanâa Alaoui, Younès Mégri
- Cinematography: David Nissen
- Edited by: Abdelilah Hilal
- Music by: Emmanuel Binet
- Release date: 2003
- Country: Morocco
- Language: Moroccan Arabic

Face to Face (French: Face à Face) is a Moroccan feature film directed by Abdelkader Lagtaâ and released in 2003. It premiered at the Moroccan National Film Festival in Oujda and was also screened at the Marrakech International Film Festival.

== Synopsis ==
Kamal is an engineer working on the construction of a dam in the South. He is married and seems happy with his wife Amal and their daughter. The only problem is that his wife wants to get back to work as agreed. The corruption that reigns in the construction industry will catch up with the overly scrupulous engineer. His wife is arrested by the police. He allows himself to be convinced that she has run away and in turn, disappears. The couple finds itself separated, each one harboring a grudge against the other. Years later, Amal and her brother-in-law try to find her husband. Their journey gradually becomes a journey into memory, theirs and that of a whole generation of Moroccans.
