= The Bitter Orange =

2007 Moroccan film

- Film poster
- Written by: Bahiya Soussi Abdellah
- Directed by: Bouchra Ijork
- Starring: Houda Rihani; Youssef Joundy
- Music by: K'lma Group
- Country of origin: Morocco
- Original language: Arabic

Production
- Producer: Soread 2M
- Cinematography: Jérôme Krumenacker
- Editor: Hassan Boufous
- Running time: 90 minutes

Original release
- Network: 2M
- Release: 14 September 2007

The Bitter Orange (Arabic: البرتقالة المرة) is a 2007 Moroccan drama film directed by Bouchra Ijork, starring Houda Rihani and Youssef Joundy set in Asilah in the 1980s. The film was first aired on television during Ramadan of 2007 on 2M.

== Plot ==
Saadia was a lonely girl living with her strict father and her mother in an old house in the city of Asilah. Her life was simple and quiet, the days repeating themselves in the rhythm of a single routine: accompanying her friend Aouatef to the bitter orange groves, where they would pick the fruit that most people disliked. But Saadia knew that its sweetness revealed itself when turned into a delicious marmalade.

One day, as Saadia was reaching through the branches to gather some fruit, a young policeman named Amine appeared. He tried to dissuade her from picking the oranges, explaining that they were bitter and unfit for consumption. But when she told him she used them to make marmalade, something he had never heard of before, he listened attentively. He suddenly felt a sense of loss for never having tasted that sweet dish she prepared. From that moment on, something shifted in Saadia’s heart — this handsome man who appeared so suddenly had entered her world with a gentleness that contrasted with the firmness of his uniform.

Her attachment to him grew quickly. To her, he embodied the husband she had always dreamed of: handsome, kind, and a perfect balance of authority and warmth.

Days went by, and her love deepened, despite the fact they had only met once. For Amine, it had been a fleeting moment of interest, nothing more. Unable to suppress her feelings, Saadia decided to express her desire to build a life with him. With the help of her cousin, she wrote him a letter pouring out her emotions and her dream of marrying him.

But fate had other plans. The letter arrived after Amine had already become engaged to another woman. As the joyful ululations of wedding celebrations rang out, Saadia came face to face with the crushing reality of her loss. Emotionally shattered, she collapsed under the weight of the bitter truth.

Over time, she found herself drifting along a winding path toward the unknown — until the day of the accident. Wandering aimlessly along a public road, she was struck by a car. Life stood still once more as Amine, now older and graying, found her unconscious and rushed her to the hospital.

There, in the hospital, through tears, Amine discovered the letter — the one his mother had kept hidden from him. Only then did he learn of Saadia’s love for him, a love he came to understand too late. And so, the story of that tragic love remained etched in memory, suspended between the bitterness of orange marmalade and the dreams of a girl who longed for a faithful, handsome husband.

== Cast ==
- Houda Rihani as Saadia
- Youssef Joundy as Amine
- Fadila Benmoussa as Rqiya
- Abdellah Lamrani as Mohamed
- Rim Chemaou as Aouatef
- Nouria Benbrahim as Khadija
- Souad Saber as Lalla Mina
- Soumaya Amghar as Leila
- Farida Bouaazaoui as Karima
- Kenza Fridou as Mennana

== Production ==
Bouchra Ijork cites the support she received from Mohamed Abderrahman Tazi as vital. Ijork sought to present authentic Moroccanness in all details of the film: clothing, decoration, makeup, and music. She also cited criticisms of Moroccan love stories as lacking emotional expression as a driving source of inspiration to prove the opposite.

== Soundtrack ==
K'lma, a duet with Sakina Lafdaili and Fayçal Azizi, performed the song "Warda 'Ala Warda" (وردة على وردة "Rose Upon Rose").

== Release ==
The film was first broadcast on Morocco’s 2M TV on September 14, 2007, coinciding with the first day of Ramadan.

== Influence ==
The film The Bitter Orange made of its stars Houda Rihani and Youssef Joundy an in-demand on-screen couple.
