= Wechma =

- وشمة
- Directed by: Hamid Bénani
- Written by: Hamid Bénani
- Cinematography: Mohamed Abderrahman Tazi
- Edited by: Ahmed Bouanani
- Music by: Kamal Dominique Hellebois
- Release date: 1970
- Country: Morocco

Wechma (Arabic: وشمة) is a Moroccan film directed by Hamid Bénani, released in 1970.

== Cast ==
- Abdelkader Moutaa
- Mohamed Alkaghat
- Mohamed Kadan
- Khadija Moujahid
- Tawfik Dadda
