= Before the Dying of the Light =

- Directed by: Ali Essafi
- Produced by: Ali Essafi for Cinemaat Productions
- Cinematography: Archives Material
- Edited by: Chaghig Arzoumanian
- Animation by: Mohamed Slaoui-Andaloussi
- Release date: 2020
- Running time: 70 minutes
- Country: Morocco
- Languages: Moroccan Arabic, French

Before the Dying of the Light (Arabic: قبل زحف الظلام, Tifinagh: ⵓⵜⵔ ⴷⴻⵔⵜ ⵜⵉⴼⵔⵙ) is a 2020 documentary film directed and produced by Moroccan filmmaker Ali Essafi.

== Synopsis ==
The documentary chronicles the revolution of Moroccan avant-garde cinema in the 1970s under Hassan II's repressive reign, through a collage of archival footage, posters and magazine covers, jazz music, and animations.

== Awards and accolades ==
Award	
IDFA ReFrame Award for Creative Use of Archive	Nominated
IDFA Award for Best Mid-Length Documentary	Nominated
