= Youssef Fadel =

Moroccan novelist and playwright

- Born: 1 January 1949 (age 76); Casablanca
- Citizenship: Morocco
- Occupation(s): Novelist, Playwright, Theatrical director, Screenwriter, Dialogue writer, Writer

Youssef Fadel (born 1949) is a Moroccan novelist and playwright.

== Early life ==
He was born in Casablanca.

He participated in leftist cultural and political circles starting in the 1960s and was imprisoned by the Moroccan government in the 1980s in the infamous Moulay al-Sheriff prison, during the notorious Years of Lead. He continues to invest political significance in his work today, stating in 2018 that "[t]o be a writer you have to be against the state, firstly...Against everything—the writer is a demolisher. He or she must demolish all taboos, all statues, all idols."

== Career ==
He has written many plays and novels throughout his career, starting in the 1960s. His debut play, The Barber in the Poor District, was turned into a film by Mohamed Reggab in 1982. He has written nine novels, including Hashish (winner of the Grand Atlas Prize in 2001), A Rare Blue Bird that Flies with Me (shortlisted for the Arabic Booker Prize in 2014), and The Life of Butterflies (longlisted for the Arabic Booker Prize in 2021). His career has reached international acclaim, with coverage in literary forums such as The New Yorker and The Massachusetts Review.

Jorge Aguadé published a study of the diglossic language used in Fadel's works in "Des romans diglossiques: le cas de Youssef Fadel" (Cadiz University, Cadiz, Spain).
