= Mohamed El Habachi =

Moroccan actor

- Born: 1939; Casablanca
- Died: 22 November 2013 (aged 73–74); Casablanca
- Citizenship: Morocco
- Occupation: Actor
- Notable work: Blood Wedding

Mohamed El Habachi (1939, Casablanca – 22 November 2013 in Casablanca) was a Moroccan actor. He was widely considered to be one of the pioneers of cinema and theater in Morocco, and was known for his performances in many Moroccan films such as Blood Wedding and The Barber of the Poor Quarter.

== Filmography ==
- 1977: Blood Wedding
- 1979: The Mirage
- 1982: The Barber of the Poor Quarter
- 1985: Forty-four, or Bedtime Stories
