= Omar Chraïbi =

Moroccan production manager and director

- Born: 22 April 1961 (age 65); Casablanca
- Citizenship: Morocco
- Occupations: Production manager, Film director, Screenwriter

Omar Chraïbi (born April 22, 1961 in Casablanca) is a Moroccan filmmaker, producer and screenwriter.

== Biography ==
Chraïbi was born in Casablanca. He obtained a bachelor's degree in literature in Casablanca in 1984, then studied photography at the Institut Communal des Arts et Décoratifs et Industriels (ICADI). He would go on to obtain a master's degree in communication sciences and techniques at Grenoble in 1986, then a Master of Advanced Study in cinema in Paris, before completing a training course at the FEMIS. He is the brother of Saâd Chraïbi.

He has been the unit production manager of multiple foreign films shot in Morocco, including The Bourne Ultimatum, Green Zone, Body of Lies and Syriana.

== Filmography ==
=== Feature films ===
- 2000: L'homme qui brodait des secrets (The Man Who Embroidered Secrets)
- 2003: Rahma
- 2007: Tissée de mains et d'étoffe (Woven from Hands and Fabric)
- 2012: The Congressman's Dinner

=== Short films ===
- 1993: Jeu Fatal (Fatal Game)
- 1995: Lumiere (Light)
- 1995: Fabula
