= Touriya Jabrane =

Moroccan actress and politician (1952–2020)

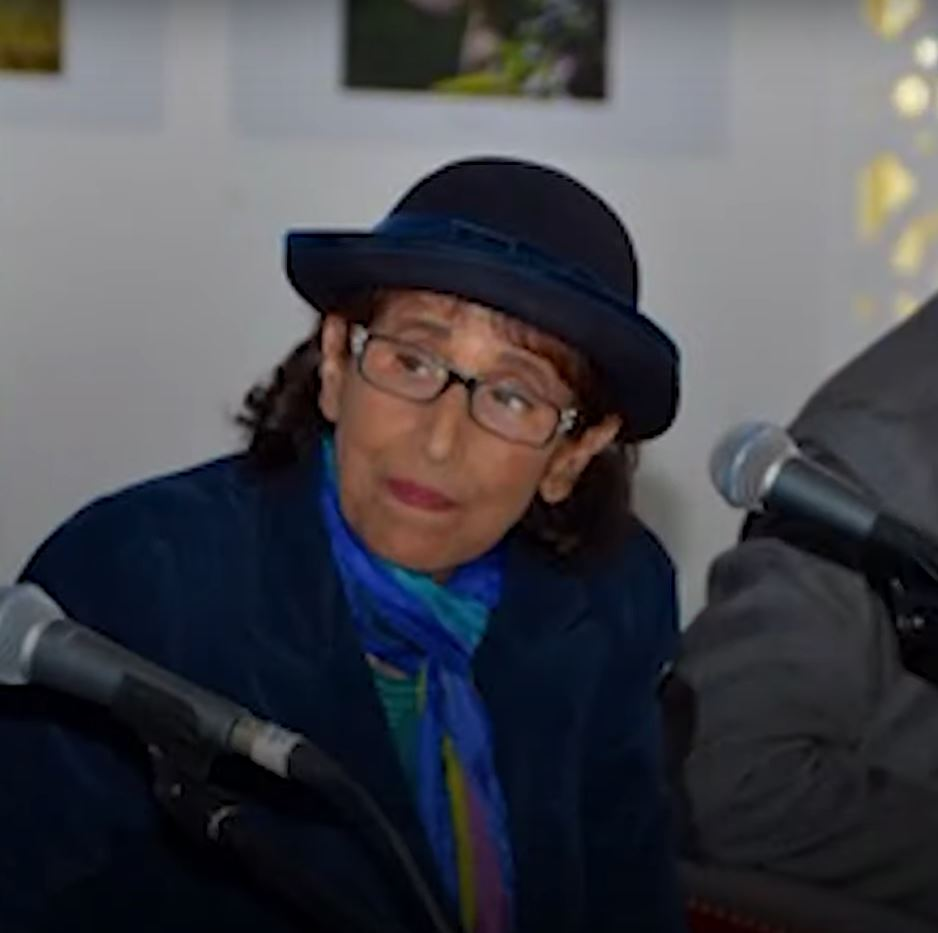

Minister of Culture
- In office 19 September 2007 – 29 July 2009
- Prime Minister: Abbas El Fassi
- Preceded by: Mohamed Achaari
- Succeeded by: Bensalem Himmich

Personal details
- Born: Saadia Kraytif; October 16, 1952 Casablanca, Morocco
- Died: August 24, 2020 (aged 67) Casablanca, Morocco
- Citizenship: Morocco
- Party: Independent
- Occupation: Politician, actress, theatre director

Touriya Jabrane (Arabic: ثريا جبران – born Saadia Kraytif Arabic: السعدية قريطيف; 16 October 1952 – 24 August 2020) was a Moroccan theatre director, actress, and politician.

== Biography ==
She was born in Casablanca. Between 2007 and 2009, Jabrane held the position of Minister of Culture in the cabinet of Abbas El Fassi.

Jabrane died in August 2020, at age 67, from COVID-19.

== See also ==
- Cabinet of Morocco
