= Abdelkader Lagtaâ =

Moroccan film director (born 1948)

- Born: 1948 (age 77–78); Casablanca
- Occupation: Film director

Abdelkader Lagtaâ (born in 1948) is a Moroccan film director, known for his work in Morocco and French documentaries.

== Biography ==
Born in 1948 in Casablanca, Abdelkader Lagtaâ graduated from The National Film School in Lodz in Poland. He directed his first short documentary film, "Rabi et la peinture abstraite" in 1984, followed by "Chaïbia" in 1984, and "Kacimi ou le dévoilement" in 1985. He directed his first feature film, "Un amour à Casablanca" in 1991, for which he was also the scriptwriter, editor and producer. When the film was released in Morocco the following year it was a great success and was selected to compete in many festivals. In 1995 he directed "Happy end", a short film which was part of the feature film "Cinq films pour cent ans" in commemoration of the centenary of the cinema. In 1998, he finished two feature films at the same time as director, scriptwriter and co-producer: "La Porte close" (started in 1993) and "Les Casablancais".

== Selected filmography ==
=== Feature films ===
- 1991: Un amour à Casablanca
- 1999: Les Casablancais
- 2003: Face to Face (Face à face)
- 2011: Entre Désir et incertitude
