= Farida Bourquia =

Moroccan film director (born 1948)

- Born: January 23, 1948 (age 78); Casablanca, Morocco
- Citizenship: Moroccan
- Education: Russian Institute of Theatre Arts
- Occupation: film director
- Known for: Le dernier aveu [The last promise], La bague [The ring], Je ne reviendrai pas [I will not come back], Le visage et le miroir [The face and the mirror], La boite magique [The magic box], La maison demandée [The popular house]
- Notable work: La braise

Farida Bourquia (born January 23, 1948) is a Moroccan film director, one of the first Moroccan women to make filmmaking a career both on the screen and in television.

== Life ==
After studying drama in Russian Institute of Theatre Arts from 1968 to 1973, Bourquia taught dramatic arts at the Conservatory of Casablanca. For most of her career, she has worked for the public broadcaster, Radiodiffusion-Télévision Marocaine, making documentaries and children's programs.

For International Women's Year in 1975, Bourquia made several documentaries about Moroccan women - the first Moroccan documentaries to be entirely produced and directed by a woman. Her 1982 feature film The Embers told the story of three orphaned village children. Two Women on the Road (2007) was "a Moroccan version of the American classic female road movie, Thelma and Louise".

== Filmography ==
=== Films made for television ===
- Le dernier aveu [The last promise]
- La bague [The ring]
- Je ne reviendrai pas [I will not come back]
- Le visage et le miroir [The face and the mirror]
- La boite magique [The magic box]
- La maison demandée [The popular house]

=== Feature films ===
- 1982: La braise
- 2007: Deux femmes sur la route
- 2014: Zaynab, la rose d'Aghmat
