= Hassan El Fad =

Moroccan actor

- حسن الفد
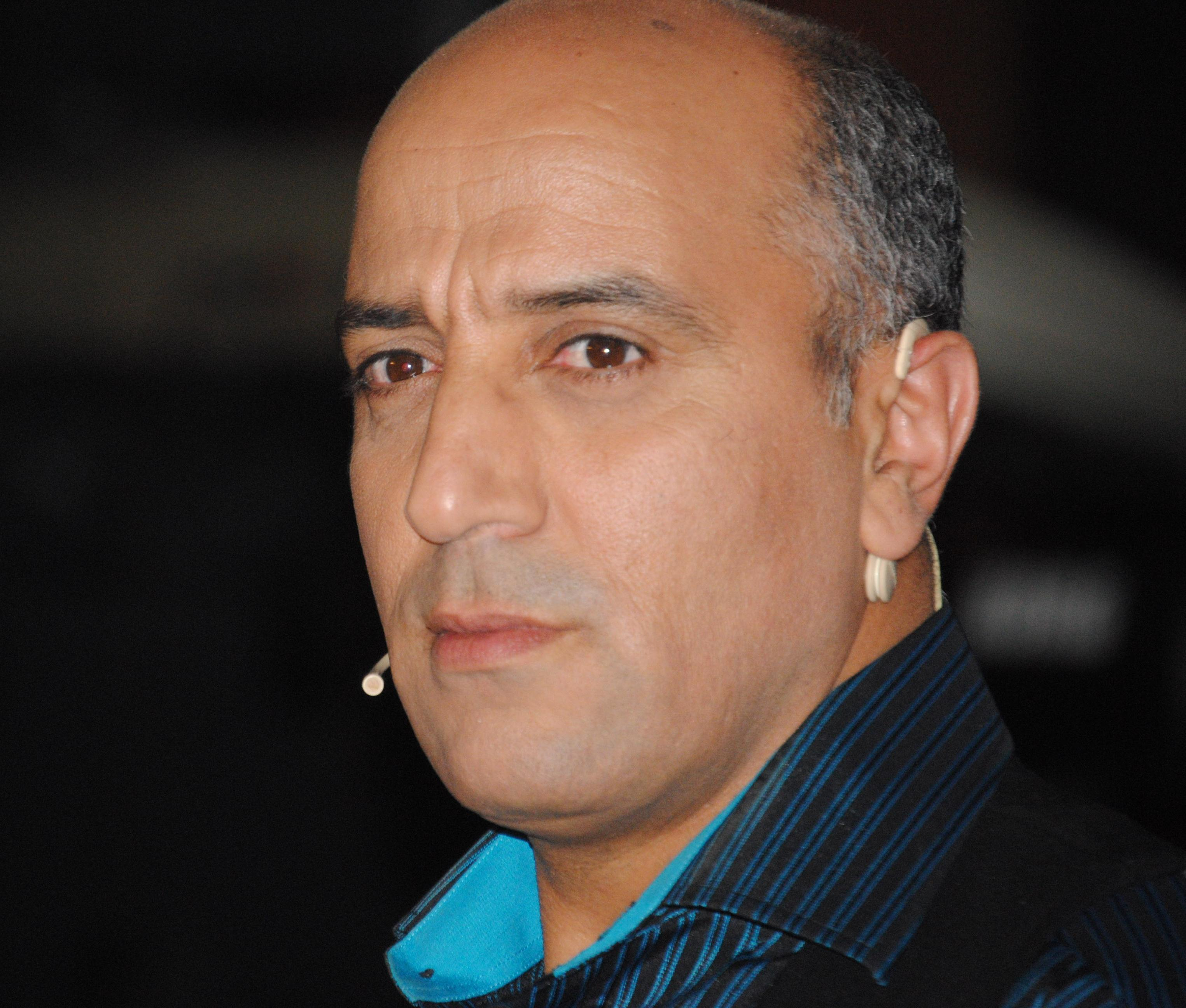
- Born: 24 November 1962 (age 63); Casablanca
- Citizenship: Morocco & Canadian
- Occupations: Actor, comedian
- Known for: Kabour

Hassan El Fad (born 24 November 1962) is a Moroccan actor and comedian born in Casablanca. He is known for his humor and comedy shows. He plays the saxophone.

His first one-man show was called Ninja. After the success of Ninja, El Fad specialized in doing serial comic shows such as Chaîne Ci BiBi, Canal 36, and Chanily TV. On-stage in 2005 El Fad presented a new one-man show Docteur Escargot ("Doctor Snail"). He also starred in the television series L'Couple.

== Career ==
In 2000, he presented Hassan O Al fad, a show featuring many traditional artists, recorded directly from Jemaa el-Fna square in Marrakech. In 2010, El Fad collaborated with director Abdelhak Chabi to create the series Fad TV, a spoof of sketches in 30 episodes. Hassan is working for the first time with young actors such as Badia Senhaji, Fouad Sad-Allah, Hamid Morchid, Oussama Mahmoud Ghadfi and the Moroccan singer Said Moskir. In 2011, Hassan El Fad collaborated with operator Wana Corporate and created Bayn Show, a series in the form of Quiz TV, which was broadcast on YouTube and then on the 2M channel.

== Television films ==
- 1995 : "Alwaad"
- 2003 : Rahma

== TV series ==
- 1999 : Oujhi F'oujhek
- 2001 : Chaîne Ci BiBi
- 2003 : Canal 36
- 2005 : Chanily TV
- 2007 : Tit Swit
- 2010 : Fad TV
- 2011-2012 : Bayn show
- 2012 : Diwana avec Abdelkader Secteur
- 2013 : L'Couple
- 2014 : L'Couple 2
- 2016 : Kabour et Lahbib
- 2016 : Salwa o Zoubir
- 2018 : Kabour et Lahbib 2
- 2020 : Tendance
- 2022 : Ti Ra Ti

== Theatre ==
=== One-man-show ===
- 1997 : Ninja
- 2005 : Docteur escargot
- 2009 : Hassan O Rbaâto
- 2012 : Ain Sebaâ
- 2017 : Who is Kabour?

== Cinéma ==
- 1993 : Yarit
- 1993 : Lumières short film
- 1996 : Fabula short film
- 1997 : Les 401 coups
- 1998 : Le destin d'une femme
- 2000 : Ali, Rabiaa et les autres...
- 2002 : Mona Saber
- 2003 : Me, my mother and Bétina
- 2020 : Claude Gagnon’s Les Vieux Chums: Abdel
