= Mostafa Derkaoui =

Moroccan film director (1944–2026

- مصطفى الدرقاوي
- Born: 12 November 1944; Oujda, Morocco
- Died: 20 August 2026 (aged 81); Casablanca, Morocco
- Occupation: Film director

Mostafa Derkaoui (Arabic: مصطفى الدرقاوي; 12 November 1944 – 20 August 2026) was a Moroccan film director and screenwriter who made revolutionary and socially-engaged films.

== Background ==
Derkaoui was born in Oujda, Morocco on 12 November 1944. In the early 1960s, Derkaoui studied philosophy in Casablanca and wrote plays. One of his first plays was banned for political reasons. For 8 months in 1963, he studied at the Institut des hautes études cinématographiques in Paris. After returning to Morocco for a short period of time, Derkaoui made his first short film "The Four Walls" which is now lost. After studying Polish for a year, he attended the Łódź Film School.

He was influenced by Jean Mitry and Georges Sadoul.

Derkaoui died in Casablanca on 20 August 2026, at the age of 81.

== Early career ==
During his time at the Łódź Film School, Derkaoui directed four short films of different genres. He also wrote a thesis titled “The role of cinema in transforming and elevating consciousness”. During his studies, Derkaoui remained politically active and engaged in student life, supporting the struggles for democracy and human rights in Morocco. In one of his student films "People from the Cellar", Derkaoui filmed debates at the Estates General of Cinema in Paris, and while most of the footage has been lost, a rare extract has remained.

== Films ==
=== About Some Meaningless Events ===
About Some Meaningless Events (Arabic: أحداث بلا دلالة), an independent film exploring the role of cinema in Morocco, was released in 1974 and subsequently banned by Moroccan authorities. In its presentation of conversations with people from different segments of society, it is similar in concept to Edgar Morin and Jean Rouch' film Chronique d’un été. Among those interviewed was the Moroccan novelist Mohamed Zafzaf. The film was believed to have disappeared until negatives were found in an archive in Barcelona in 2016.

The Museum of Modern Art described About Some Meaningless Events as "an audacious blend of drama, documentary, and improvisation," embodying a radical approach to art, politics, and social relations also found in journals such as Souffles-Anfas. The film was funded with the sale of artworks by Mohamed Melehi and others.

According to Derkaoui, the film was screened twice [in Morocco] before being banned: once in Tetuan among friends, and once at the auditorium of the OCP Group in Khouribga as part of the Festival of African Cinema. It was also screened in Paris in 1975.

About Some Meaningless Events was the main subject of Ali Essafi's documentary film Before the Dying of the Light.

Other Derkaoui films include two collective films he contributed towards (Cinders of the Vineyard (1975), The Gulf War... What Next? (1992)) as well as Les Beaux Jours de Chahrazade (1982), Je(u) au passé (1994), Les Sept Portes de la nuit (1994), Casablanca de nuit (2003), and Casablanca de jour (2004).
