= About Some Meaningless Events =

- Directed by: Mostafa Derkaoui
- Written by: Mostafa Derkaoui
- Produced by: Mostafa Derkaoui
- Cinematography: Abdelkarim Derkaoui
- Edited by: Mostafa Derkaoui
- Music by: Nahorny
- Release date: 1974
- Running time: 76 minutes
- Country: Morocco
- Language: Moroccan Arabic

About Some Meaningless Events is a 1974 docu-fiction film directed by Mostafa Derkaoui. Moroccan authorities banned the film after its first and only screening in Paris.

Widely believed to have been lost, negative prints were uncovered in the archives of the Filmoteca De Catalunya in Barcelona in 2016 by researcher Lea Morin. The prints were restored and the film was then streamed online and presented at a number of events and film festivals, including the Marseille Festival of Documentary Film, MoMa's Doc Fortnight 2021 festival, the 69th Berlin International Film Festival., and EYE Film Institute Netherlands, who offers the film on its streaming platform.

== Synopsis ==
A group of filmmakers in search of a theme to deal with interview young bypassers in Casablanca about their expectations and their relationship to Moroccan cinema. When they witness a crime committed by an exploited dockworker, who involuntarily kills his mobster boss, they decide to investigate the crime's motives, which ultimately leads them to some deep reflection on the role of cinema in Moroccan society.

== Cast ==
- Abdellatif Nour
- Abbas Fassi
- Hamid Zoughi
- Mostafa Dziri
- Aïcha Saâdoun
- Mohamed Derham
- Salaheddine Benmoussa
- Abdelkader Moutaâ
- Khalid Jamaï
- Chafik Shimi
- Malika El Mesrar
- Omar Chenbout
- Mostafa Nissabouri
