= Nayda =

Moroccan youth cultural movement

- Native name: نايضة
- Stylistic origins: Rock; hip-hop; Moroccan pop
- Cultural origins: early 2000s, Morocco

Nayda (Moroccan Arabic: نايضة; meaning "to rise up" or "to party"), also known as Hayha is a cultural movement that emerged in Morocco during the early 2000s. Centered primarily in urban hubs such as Casablanca, Meknes and Marrakech, the movement helped push new forms of artistic expressions, particularly rap and various rock and fusion musical styles, performed mainly in Moroccan Arabic (Darija).

Two significant turning points often cited in the movement's development are the 2003 affair involving young musicians accused of Satanism and the May 16, 2003 Casablanca bombings, events that subsequently energized the youth to artistically express themselves. The 2007 documentary Casanayda! illustrates how the movement gradually emerged from the late 1990s onward, evolving from an underground movement to a recognized one in the public sphere.

== Etymology ==
The term nayda in Moroccan Arabic literally means "to rise up," "to get up," or colloquially "to party," with extended connotations of "awakening." The word shares the same etymology as the 19th-century "Nahda," the Arab Renaissance movement, drawing a parallel between the two periods of significant artistic productivity.

== History ==
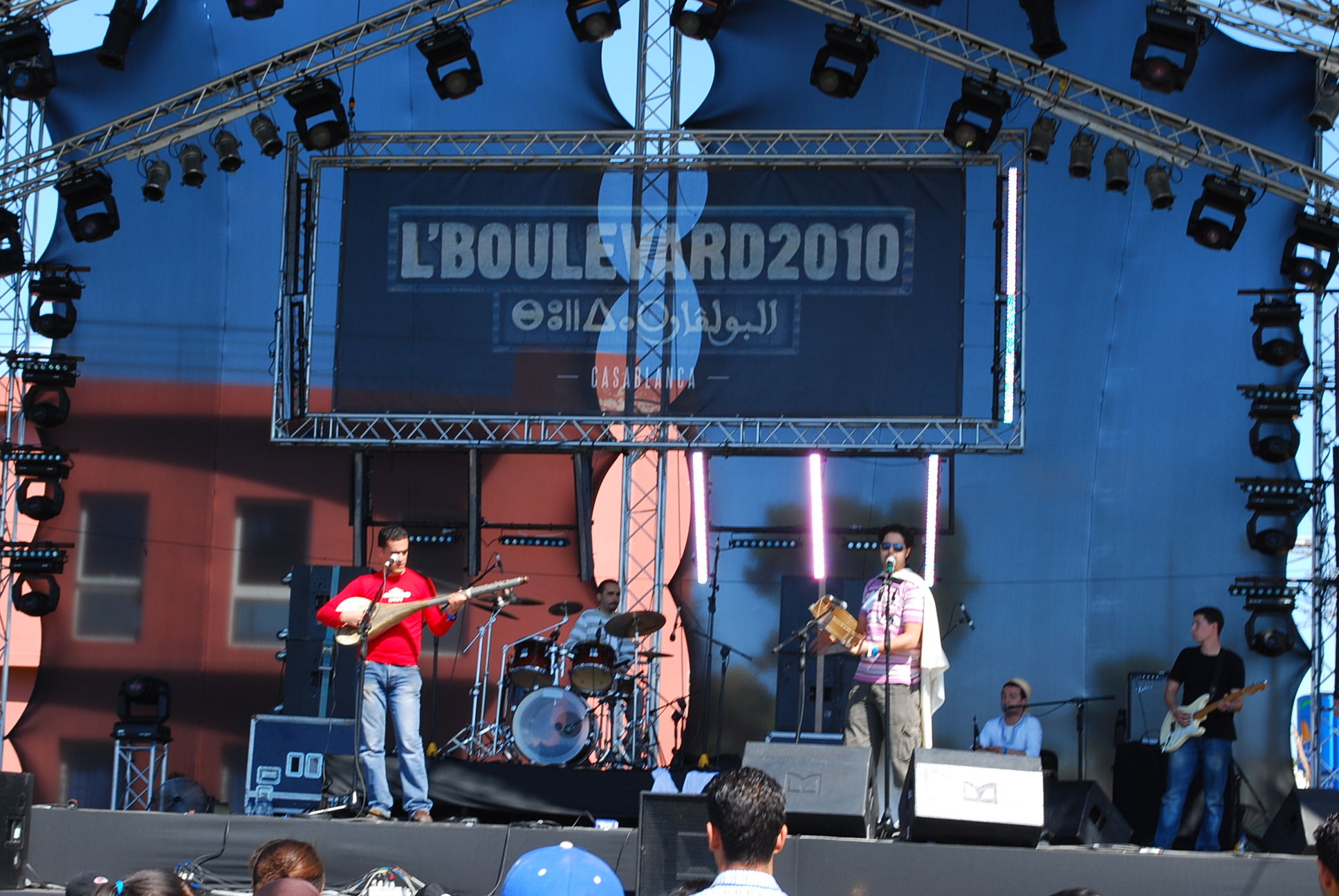
L'Boulevard Festival, often credited for promoting the Nayda movement.

The Nayda movement emerged in Morocco during the early 2000s, or as early as the late 90s per some historians. It started first primarily in the country's major urban centers, such as Casablanca, Meknes, and Marrakech, before spreading to other cities. Nayda was mostly associated with the rise of new musical genres, particularly rap and rock music, all performed mainly in Moroccan Arabic. It has been called the Moroccan Movida, referring to the La Movida Madrileña movement in post-Francoist Spain.

Scholars identify two pivotal events in 2003 that served as turning points for Nayda. The first was the event involving young musicians who were accused of Satanism. The second was the May 16, 2003 Casablanca bombings, a national trauma that strangely energized a segment of the youth to creatively express their opinions and comment on the event. Two examples of these expressions are the rapper Mobydick who released “Ne Touche Pas Mon Pays” (Don't Touch My Country); and hip-hop group Fnaire who released "Mat9ich Bladi" (Don't Touch My Country), both in response to the bombings. Some scholars have described the movement as a "secular", youth-driven "precursor to the Arab Spring".

The movement's history and significance were captured in the 2007 documentary Casanayda!, directed by Farida Benlyazid and Abderrahim Mettour, and written by Dominique Caubet. The film illustrates how this youth-led movement gradually amplified from the late 1990s onward, evolving from an underground movement to a recognized one in the public sphere. Beyond the new Moroccan music fostered by the L'Boulevard festival, the documentary shows how the cultural movement extended to the media, the internet, fashion, and even language. Casanayda! also follows young actors representative of Moroccan cultural life in their successes, as well as in their "struggles" and failures.

== Musical styles ==
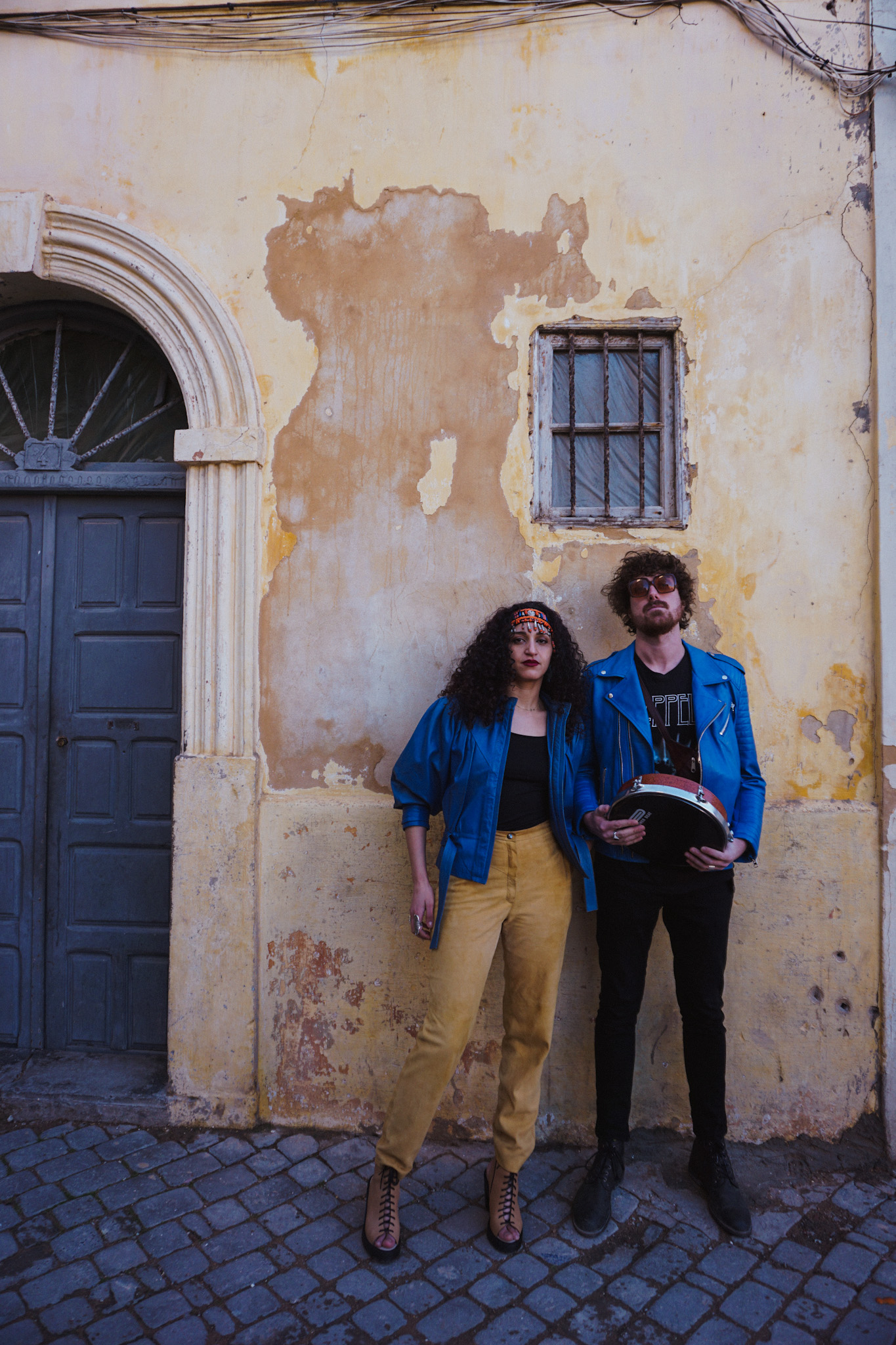
Bab L' Bluz, best known for their album Nayda (2020) in this genre

Nayda is characterized by making use of public space, including festivals and concerts, aiming to evade state control and express themselves freely. It's also characterized by several distinct musical genres that marked a shift away from both traditional Moroccan music and mainstream Arabic pop, these include:

- Rock: The movement featured an emerging rock and heavy metal scene. Pioneering groups such as Hoba Hoba Spirit, Nekros, and Immortal Spirit initially performed in English but later transitioned to using Moroccan Arabic.
- Rap: Hip-hop culture, particularly rap music, saw widespread adoption. Groups like H-Kayne from Meknes, Fnaïre from Marrakech, and Don Bigg from Casablanca emerged as leading figures. Their lyrics, almost exclusively in Darija, frequently addressed social issues and themes of everyday life.
- Fusion: A defining aspect of Nayda was the development of fusion music. This subgenre synthesized traditional Moroccan musical forms, such as gnawa, with international styles like rock, reggae, and rap, creating a new sound. Groups like Darga were central to this trend, alongside solo artists such as Ahmed Soultan. The movement also included artists like Oum, who expanded the fusion by blending Moroccan instrumentation with soul and jazz.

== Impact ==
Nayda impacted youth self-expression by opening avenues for artists to articulate social concerns and build communal identities. Festivals played a significant role in the movement's development, with L'Boulevard in Casablanca repeatedly cited as a key platform for the new generation.

Part of the movement's enduring relevance and influence, the Moroccan rock band Bab L'Bluz released an album in 2020 directly titled Nayda!, continuing the Nayda's musical fusion and themes.

== See also ==
- Moroccan hip-hop
- Culture of Morocco
