= Françoise Lépine =

French actress

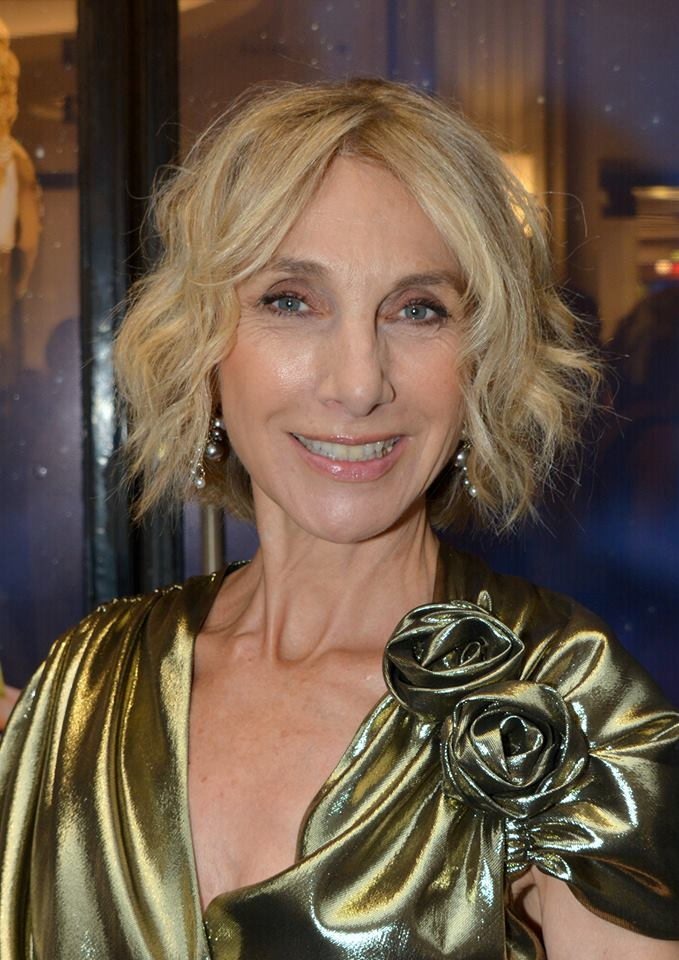
- Lépine in 2018.
- Born: France
- Occupation: Actress
- Years active: 1996–present

Françoise Lépine is a French actress.

== Theatre ==
| Year | Title | Writer | Director | Notes |
|---|---|---|---|---|
| 2002-03 | Un vrai bonheur | Didier Caron | Didier Caron | Théâtre Fontaine, Théâtre Hébertot |
| 2010 | Une comédie romantique | Gérald Sibleyras | Christophe Lidon | Théâtre Montparnasse |
| 2019-2020 | Le plus beau dans tout ça | Laurent Ruquier | Steve Suissa | Théâtre des Variétés |

== Filmography ==
| Year | Title | Role | Director | Notes |
|---|---|---|---|---|
| 1996 | Zap-matin | | Philippe Dorison | Short |
| 1996 | Homo automobilis | | Vincent Mayrand | Short |
| 1998 | Paparazzi | The press officer | Alain Berbérian | |
| 1999 | Belle maman | Nathalie | Gabriel Aghion | |
| 1999 | Cinq minutes de détente | Madame Lénignac | Tomas Roméro | |
| 1999 | Le gang des TV | | Artus de Penguern | Short |
| 2000 | The Libertine | Antoinette Diderot | Gabriel Aghion (2) | |
| 2000 | Noël et les garçons | The mother | Jean-Marc Vincent | Short |
| 2001 | Origine contrôlée | Inspector | Ahmed Bouchaala, Zakia Tahri | |
| 2001 | Belphegor, Phantom of the Louvre | Suzanne Dupré | Jean-Paul Salomé | |
| 2001 | L'oiseau rare | Lise | Didier Albert | TV movie |
| 2002 | Entrevue | | Marie-Pierre Huster | Short |
| 2002 | Alice Nevers: Le juge est une femme | Madame Renac | Pierre Boutron | TV series (1 episode) |
| 2003 | Laisse tes mains sur mes hanches | Hélène | Chantal Lauby | |
| 2003 | 7 ans de mariage | Ariane | Didier Bourdon | |
| 2003 | Mes enfants ne sont pas comme les autres | The journalist | Denis Dercourt | |
| 2003 | Toute première fois | The Lady | Michaël Souhaité | Short; Paris Projection Courte - Best Female Actress |
| 2003 | Ticket choc | Sandra | Marie-Pierre Huster (2) | Short |
| 2004 | Arsène Lupin | The Duchess | Jean-Paul Salomé (2) | |
| 2005 | Un vrai bonheur | France | Didier Caron | |
| 2005 | Les Montana | Alexandra | Benoît d'Aubert | TV series (3 episodes) |
| 2005 | Prozac tango | Odile | Michaël Souhaité (2) | Short |
| 2006 | Avenue Montaigne | Magali Garrel | Danièle Thompson | |
| 2007 | Mademoiselle Joubert | Tina | Eric Summer | TV series (1 episode) |
| 2007 | Qui va à la chasse... | Wanda Valmer | Olivier Laubacher | TV movie |
| 2007 | S.O.S. 18 | Christine Corget | Dominique Baron, Bruno Garcia, Patrick Jamain | TV series (4 episodes) |
| 2009 | Pas de toit sans moi | Nathalie | Guy Jacques | TV movie |
| 2010 | En apparence | Eva | Benoît d'Aubert (2) | TV movie |
| 2011 | It Is Miracul'house | Sophie | Stéphane Freiss | Short |
| 2011 | Pourquoi tu pleures? | The lady of the agency | Katia Lewkowicz | |
| 2011 | Hard | Françoise | Cathy Verney | TV series (1 episode) |
| 2011 | Interpol | Sophie Montignac | Eric Summer (2) | TV series (1 episode) |
| 2012 | Profilage | Christine Marchand | Alexandre Laurent | TV series (1 episode) |
| 2013 | Me, Myself and Mum | Mom theater | Guillaume Gallienne | |
| 2013 | Demi-soeur | Françoise | Josiane Balasko | |
| 2014 | Peuple de Mylonesse, pleurons la Reine Naphus | The queen | Eric Le Roch | Short |
| 2014 | Tiens-toi droite | Ingrid | Katia Lewkowicz (2) | |
| 2015 | The law of Alexandre | Marina Pilsky | Claude-Michel Rome | TV series (1 episode) |
| 2015 | Hôtel de la plage | Océane | Christian Merret-Palmair | TV series (1 episode) |
| 2017 | Bonne Pomme | Nadine | Florence Quentin | |
