= Joseph Malerba =

French actor (born 1962)

- Born: 5 October 1962 (age 63); Paris, France
- Occupation: Actor
- Years active: 1992–present

Joseph Malerba (born 5 October 1962) is a French actor known for his role as police detective Walter Morlighem in the French TV series Braquo. He has appeared in numerous films, television productions, and theatre plays since 1992.

== Selected filmography ==
=== Film ===
List of film appearances, with year, title, and role shown
Year	Title	Role	Director	Notes
1992	Toutes peines confondues	Inspector Nolo	Michel Deville	
1994	Léon: The Professional	Stairway SWAT	Luc Besson	
1995	Les Misérables	Pump man	Claude Lelouch	
1996	The Best Job in the World	Taxi driver	Gérard Lauzier	
1998	Lautrec	Doctor	Roger Planchon	
1999	Terror Firmer	French cool cat	Lloyd Kaufman	
1999	The Messenger: The Story of Joan of Arc	Beaurevoir's guard	Luc Besson	
2001	Origine contrôlée	Human resources director	Ahmed Bouchaala & Zakia Tahri	
2001	A Hell of a Day	Marco	Marion Vernoux	
2003	Father and Sons	Eric	Michel Boujenah	
2003	The Statement	Max	Norman Jewison	
2005	13 Tzameti	Accountant	Géla Babluani	
2006	Marie Antoinette	Queen's guard	Sofia Coppola	
2008	Mesrine	Robert	Jean-François Richet	
2008	Paris	Taxi driver	Cédric Klapisch	
2008	Rivals	Robber #1	Jacques Maillot	
2012	Bad Girl	Pablo's friend	Patrick Mille	
2015	En équilibre	Victor	Denis Dercourt	
2015	Belle & Sebastian: The Adventure Continues	Alfonso	Christian Duguay	
2017	A Bag of Marbles	Marcello	Christian Duguay	

=== Television ===
List of film appearances, with year, title, and role shown
Year	Title	Role	Notes
1994	Maigret	Bartender	1 episode
1998	Navarro	Ernest Passero	1 episode
2006	Les Bleus	Lieutenant Simoni	1 episode
2008	Josephine, Guardian Angel	Denis	1 episode
2009–16	Braquo	Walter Morlighem	28 episodes
2014	Rosemary's Baby	Paul	2 episodes
2014–17	The law of ...	Yanis Girard / Olivier Landry	2 episodes
2015	Cherif	Colonel Decroix	1 episode
2017	Section de recherches	Simon Walter	1 episode
2019	Absentia	Jacques	1 episode
