= Synapson =

French musical duo

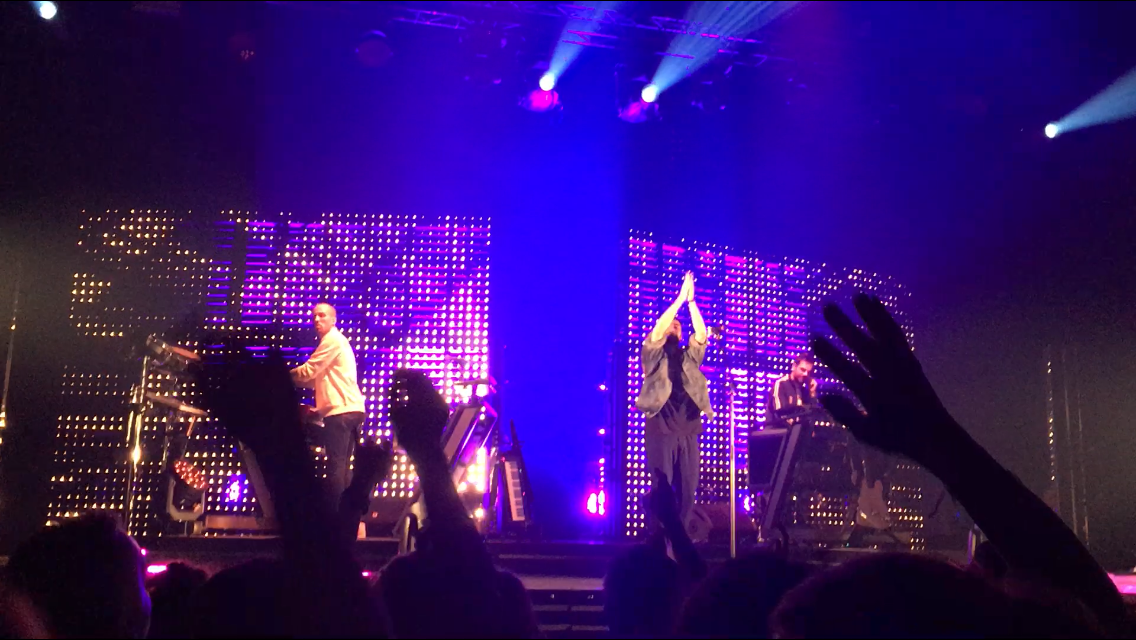
- Alexandre Chière and Paul Cucuron in Grenoble, 2018

Background information
- Origin: Paris, France
- Genres: World music; hip hop; house-funk; pop
- Years active: 2009–present
- Members: Alexandre Chiere; Paul Cucuron

Synapson are a French electro, nu disco and deep house duo of disc jockeys and record producers from Paris.

== History ==
The duo was formed in 2009 with the multi-instrumentalists Alexandre Chiere (keyboard, saxophone, beat and vocals) and Paul Cucuron (drums, scratch, record production and mixing). Singer Anna Hercot occasionally participates on some of their sets. They released their maxi Haute Couture in 2010 followed by album Stendhal Syndrome resulting in the single "Sentimental Affair". Their album Convergence with world music, hip hop, house-funk and pop influences charted both in France and Belgium.

They are best known for their remake of Burkinabé singer-songwriter and musician Victor Démé's song "Djôn'maya", renamed "Djon maya maï" and credited to Synapson featuring Victor Démé. The single charted in France and Belgium, reaching number 12 on the SNEP French Singles Chart. The duo had similar success with "All in You" featuring Anna Kova making it to number 10 on the French charts. Both hits are included in Synapson's album Convergence. Their 2018 song "Hide Away" featuring Holly garnered meme status due to its use in a controversial 2024 Hazbin Hotel fan animation centered around Charlie Morningstar commissioned by Internet beatboxer Verbalase (Adym S. Evans) for $50,000.

== Discography ==
=== Albums ===
Title	Album details	Peak positions	
Title	Album details	FRA	BEL (Wa)
Stendhal Syndrome	Released: 5 November 2012; Label: Sol - Diez Music / Musicast; Formats: CD, digital download	–	–
Convergence	Released: 15 October 2015; Label: Warner Music Group; Formats: CD, digital download	26	73
Super 8	Released: 22 June 2018; Label: Warner Music Group; Formats: CD, digital download		

=== EPs ===
Title	Album details	Peak positions	
Title	Album details	FRA	BEL (Wa)
Haute Couture	Released: 21 July 2010; Label: Synapson; Formats: digital download	–	–

=== Singles ===
Year	Album	Peak positions		Album
Year	Album	FRA	BEL (Wa)	Album
2012	"Sentimental Affair"	–	–	Stendhal Syndrome
2014	"Djon maya maï" (featuring Victor Démé)	12	9	Convergence (including deluxe edition)
2015	"All in You" (featuring Anna Kova)	10	4	Convergence (including deluxe edition)
2015	"Moonlight" (featuring Charles Harvey)	139	–	Convergence (including deluxe edition)
2015	"Fireball" (featuring Broken Back)	66	–	Convergence (including deluxe edition)
2016	"Blade Down" (featuring Tessa B)	37	–	Convergence (including deluxe edition)
2016	"Going Back to My Roots" (featuring Tessa B)	25	–	Convergence (including deluxe edition)
2018	"Hide Away" (featuring Holly)	44	32	Super 8
2018	"Souba" (featuring Lass)			Super 8
2021	"Waylalah" (featuring Bab L' Bluz)	–	–	

== Awards and nominations ==
- 2016: Berlin Music Video Awards, nominated in the Best Editor category for 'FIREBALL'
- 2016: Berlin Music Video Awards, nominated in the Best Song category for 'ALL IN YOU'
