= Les beaux jours de Shehrazade =

- Directed by: Mostafa Derkaoui
- Written by: Mostafa Derkaoui
- Produced by: Art 7
- Starring: Abdelwahab Doukali, Naïma Lamcharki, Mariam Fakhr Eddine
- Cinematography: Abdelkrim Derkaoui
- Edited by: Mohamed Meziane
- Release date: 1982
- Running time: 97 minutes
- Country: Morocco
- Language: Moroccan Arabic

Les beaux jours de Shehrazade (English: The Beautiful Days of Sheherazade, Arabic: Ayyaam Chahrazad al-Hilwa) is 1982 Moroccan film directed by Mostafa Derkaoui. It was screened at the 1st Moroccan National Film Festival held in Rabat.

== Synopsis ==
A team of filmmakers is faced with the challenge of choosing a subject to film. After a lengthy discussion, they end up settling with the story of a cabaret singer.

== Cast ==
- Abdelwahab Doukali
- Naïma Lamcharki
- Mariam Fakhr Eddine
- Farid Belkahia
