= Zakia Tahri =

- Born: 1963 (age 62–63); Lille
- Occupation: Film director - Screenwriter

Zakia Tahri, also known as Zakia Bouchaâla (born 1963) is a French-based filmmaker and actress of Moroccan descent.

== Life ==
Zakia Tahiri was born in Lille. She acted in the French war film Fort Saganne (1984), and played the heroine in Farida Benlyazid's acclaimed Une porte sur la ciel (1987). She also had major roles in Mohamed Abderrahman Tazi's Moroccan films Badis (1989) and In Search of My Wife's Husband (1993).

Her husband is the Algerian filmmaker Ahmed Bouchaâla. She co-wrote Bouchaâla's first film Krim (1995) and co-directed his second film, Origine contrôlée (2001). The pair also collaborated on writing Abdelhai Laraki's first Moroccan feature film, Mona Saber (2001).

Zakia Tahri's 2009 comedy Number One examined gender relations, and particularly the performance of masculinity, in Morocco after the reformed Moudawana.

== Films ==
As write
(with Ahmed Bouchaâla) Krim (1995), dir, by Ahmed Bouchaâla

- (with Ahmed Bouchaâla) Mona Saber (2001), dir. by Abdelhai Laraki

as director

- (with Ahmed Bouchaâla) Origine contrôlée / Made in France, 2001
- Number One, 2009
- (with Ahmed Bouchaâla) Marh'ba, 2011
