= Noureddine Saïl =

Moroccan journalist (1947–2020)

- Born: 1948; Tangier
- Citizenship: Morocco
- Occupations: Journalist, Film critic, Manager, Screenwriter, Film producer

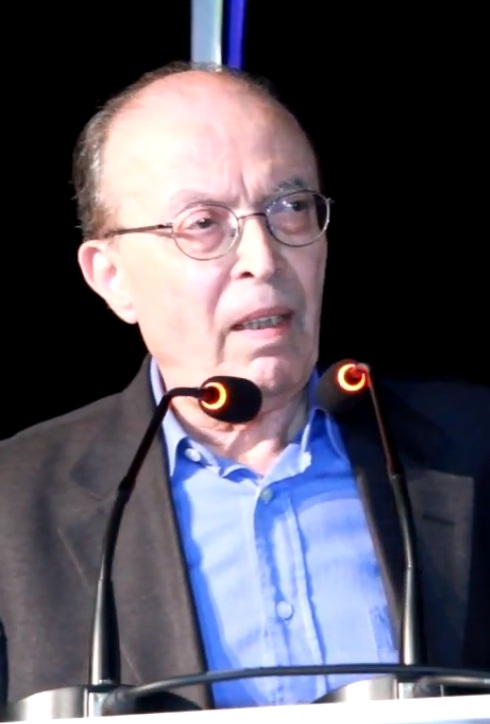
Saïl in 2017

Nour-Eddine Saïl (1947 – 15 December 2020) was a Moroccan media executive, educator, film critic, and writer.

For four decades he played a central role in encouraging Moroccan cinema. Nour-Eddine Saïl was born in Tangiers in 1947, (disputed) he obtained higher diplomas in philosophy and had critical contributions in the field of cinema, before working in Moroccan television, and then moved to the French channel Canal Plus.

He occupied the position of director of the Moroccan Film Center, and before that he held the position of director general of Morocco Channel Two (2M).

In 2004, he married television presenter Nadia Larguet. They had a son: Suleïman Alexandre Saïl.

== Life and career ==
Nour-Eddine Saïl was born in Tangier. He completed secondary education at Lycée Ibn Al Khatib in Tangier and gained a DES in philosophy from the Faculty of Letters in Rabat. He taught philosophy at Lycée Moulay Youssef in Rabat.

In 1970 Saïl, influenced by the Third Cinema movement, launched Morocco's first cinema magazine, the short-lived Cinéma 3. Though only a few issues were published, Cinéma 3 prompted cinematic pages to appear in national newspapers for the first time. In 1973 he founded the Fédération Nationale de Ciné-Clubs de Maroc (FNCCM), and was its president until 1983. The FNCCM helped to establish the Festival du Cinéma Africain de Khouribga in 1977.

From 1975 to 1984 Saïl was an inspector general of philosophy instruction. From 1984 to 1986 he was program director of Télévision Marocaine (TVM). From 1989 to 1990 he was an audiovisual consultant at Omnium Nord-Africain (ONA), and from 1990 to 2000 he was program director and director general of Canal Horizons.

In 2000 Saïl became director of 2M, launching a plan to increase its national television production by making local telefilms. Their first production was The Blind Whale, Morocco's first police television film. By 2002 the station was making one telefilm a month, and by 2006 it was making two telefilms a month.

From 2003 to 2014 Saïl was director of the Moroccan Cinematographic Center (CCM).

From 2015 to 2020 he worked for EUROPA CINEMAS in Paris.

== Death ==
He died from complications of COVID-19 at the Cheikh Zayd Hospital in Rabat on 15 December 2020, during the COVID-19 pandemic in Morocco, aged 73.

== Works ==
=== Films (as writer) ===
- Le Grand Voyage, dir. Mohamed Abderrahman Tazi, 1981
- Badis, dir. Mohammed Abderrahman Tazi, 1990
- Lalla Hobby, dir. Mohammed Abderrahman Tazi, 1996

=== Novels ===
- "L'Ombre du Chroniqueur"
