= Bachir Skiredj =

Moroccan actor (1939–2021)

- Born: 26 May 1939
- Died: 28 January 2021 (aged 81); Orlando, Florida, United States
- Occupation: Actor . filmmaker . comedian . screenwriter
- Notable work: Il était une fois, il était deux fois

Bachir Skiredj (26 May 1939 – 28 January 2021) was a Moroccan actor, filmmaker, comedian, and screenwriter. A popular entertainer for decades, he was best known for his role in Mohamed Abderrahman Tazi's À la recherche du mari de ma femme, a box office success.

== Controversies ==
In a 2014 commercial for real estate agency Addoha, Skiredj was criticized for playing the role of a polygamist seeking to separate his "four punishments", which he refuses to see living under the same roof. The commercial, deemed sexist, was withdrawn after 2M yielded to pressure.

In 2018, two individuals were sentenced to two years in prison after leaking a video of an intoxicated Skiredj insulting the royal family.

== Death ==
Following a long battle with COVID-19, Skiredj died at his Orlando, Florida, home on 28 January 2021, during the COVID-19 pandemic in Florida.

== Partial filmography ==
=== As director ===
- 2007: Il était une fois, il était deux fois

=== As actor ===
- 1977: Une brèche dans le mur
- 1988: Une porte sur le ciel
- 1988: Badis
- 1993: À la recherche du mari de ma femme (In Search of My Wife's Husband)
- 2001: Les Amours de Haj Mokhtar Soldi (The Loves of Haj Mokhtar Soldi)
