= Origine contrôlée =

2001 film by Ahmed Bouchaala and Zakia Tahri

- Theatrical release poster
- Directed by: Ahmed Bouchaala; Zakia Tahri
- Written by: Ahmed Bouchaala; Bruno Dega; Fred Rubio; Zakia Tahri
- Produced by: Bob Bellion; Raymond Blumenthal
- Starring: Ronit Elkabetz; Patrick Ligardes; Atmen Kalif
- Cinematography: Yves Cape
- Edited by: Roland Baubeau
- Music by: Serge Perathoner; Jannick Top
- Production companies: Blue Films; Deluxe Productions; M6 Films; New Mark; Rhône-Alpes Cinéma
- Distributed by: Universal Pictures (through United International Pictures)
- Release date: 24 January 2001 (France)
- Running time: 90 minutes
- Country: France
- Language: French

Origine contrôlée (US title: Made in France) is a 2001 French comedy-drama film starring Ronit Elkabetz. It is also the debut French-language picture to star Elkabetz, famous for Hebrew-language roles in her native Israel. Elkabetz acquired French fluency after moving to France in 1997. The film was written and directed by Ahmed Bouchaala and Zakia Tahri. It was awarded the Le Roger Award for Best French Feature by the Avignon & New York Film Festival.

== Plot synopsis ==
A bourgeois white man (Ligardes) finds himself the victim of mistaken identity when he dresses up in drag yet is mistaken by authorities for a criminal Algerian transsexual. During his overnight stay in jail he meets two strangers, a beur, Youssef (Kelif) and Sophia (Elkabetz), a woman seeking a sex-change operation. The eclectic trio embark on a hedonistic tour through Paris and the surrounding countryside, amidst the frivolities, and problems such as the immigration authorities and the police presence.

== Casting ==
Elkabetz was cast in the starring role after directors Bouchaala and Tahri attended the closing night of her one-woman show in Paris playing Martha Graham.

=== Cast ===
- Ronit Elkabetz as Sonia
- Atmen Kalif as Youssef
- Patrick Ligardes as Patrick
- Isabelle Sadoyan as Aunt
- El Kebir as Lamine
- Alexia Stresi as Marie
- Françoise Lépine as The Inspector
- Joseph Malerba as Human resources director
- Jean-Luc Porraz as The Lawyer
