= Lalla Hobby =

- Directed by: Mohamed Abderrahman Tazi
- Written by: Noureddine Saïl
- Produced by: Ahmed Baha Eddine Attia
- Cinematography: Alain Marcoen
- Music by: Abdelwahab Doukkali
- Production company: Arts en techniques
- Distributed by: Arts et Techniques Audiovisuels (ATA)
- Release date: 15 December 1996
- Running time: 95 minutes
- Country: Morocco
- Language: Moroccan Arabic

Lalla Hoby is a 1996 Moroccan comedy film directed by Mohamed Abderrahman Tazi. It is the sequel to In Search of My Wife's Husband.

== Synopsis ==
After a rash decision, Hadj Benmoussa sets off for Europe and embarks on an adventure in attempt to find his ex-wife and her new husband in order to remarry her.

== Cast ==
- Hamidou
- Amina Rachid
- Naïma Lamcherki
- Ahmed Talh El Alj
- Samya Akariou
- Pierre Lekeux
