= Naima Lamcharki =

Moroccan actress (1943–2024)

- نعيمة المشرقي
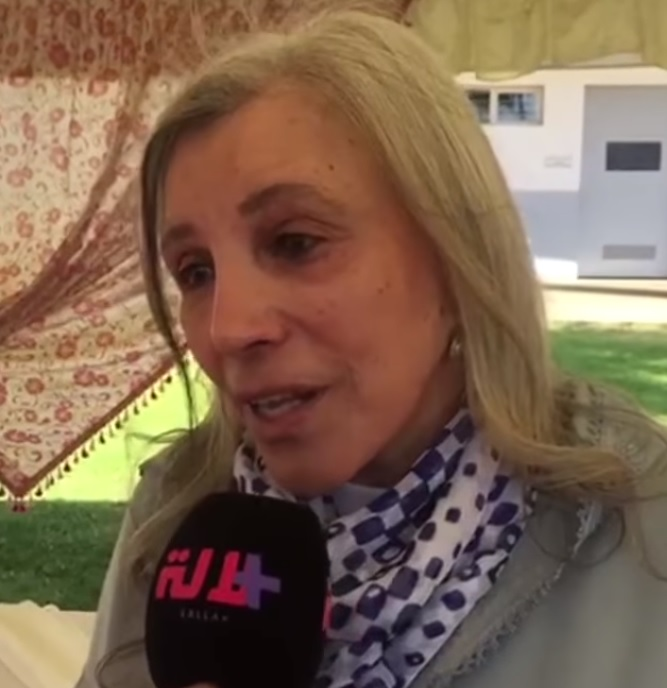
- Lamcharki in 2018
- Born: 11 July 1943; Casablanca, Morocco
- Died: 5 October 2024 (aged 81); Casablanca, Morocco
- Occupation: Actress
- Notable work: Blood Wedding

Naima Lamcharki (Arabic: نعيمة المشرقي; 11 July 1943 – 5 October 2024) was a Moroccan actress.

== Death ==
Lamcharki died in Casablanca on 5 October 2024, at the age of 81.

== Awards ==
Lamcharki won the prize for Best Female Lead for her performance in Mohamed Abderrahman Tazi's comedy In Search of My Wife's Husband, one of Morocco's most popular domestic hits, at the country's 6th National Film Festival in 2001.

In 2021, she won the Best Actress award at Sweden's 11th annual Malmö Arab Film Festival (MAFF) for her role in Mohamed Mouftakir's Autumn of Apple Trees.

== Partial filmography ==
=== As actress ===
- 1961: La venganza de Don Mendo
- 1963: Casablanca, Nest of Spies
- 1977: Blood Wedding
- 1982: Les Beaux Jours de Shéhérazade
- 1993: À la recherche du mari de ma femme
- 1998: Rue La Caire
- 2002: Et après?
- 2006: Mauvaise foi
- 2010: La grande villa
- 2020: L’automne des pommiers
