= Casanayda! =

- Directed by: Farida Belyazid, Abderrahim Mettour
- Written by: Dominique Caubet, Farida Belyazid, Abderrahim Mettour
- Produced by: Ali Kettani, Dino Sebti, Franck Beugniet
- Cinematography: Elmenouar fahd
- Edited by: Abderrahim Mettour, Mahmoud Mougada, Nelly Meriguet-Bounouar
- Production company: Sigma Technologies
- Distributed by: 2M TV Maroc, Sigma Technologies
- Release date: 2007
- Running time: 52 minutes
- Country: Morocco
- Languages: Moroccan Arabic, French

Casanayda! (English: Casa Is Rocking!, French: Casa ça bouge!) is a 2007 documentary film directed by Farida Belyazid and Abderrahim Mettour. It was screened at multiple national and international festivals.

== Synopsis ==
Casanayda! is a documentary that follows young artists and musicians in Casablanca. The film shows their daily work and the challenges they face while creating independent art.
