= Women's Wiles =

- Directed by: Farida Benlyazid
- Written by: Farida Benlyazid
- Based on: Moroccan legend "La fille au basilic"
- Produced by: Hassan Daldoul, Farida Benlyazid
- Starring: Samira Akariou, Rachid El Ouali, Fatma Bensaidane
- Cinematography: Serge Palatsi
- Edited by: Kahéna Attia
- Music by: Mohamed Cherraf, Fawzi Thabet
- Production companies: Tingitania Films (Morocco); Waka Films (Switzerland); Touza Productions (Tunisia); Céphéide Productions (France)
- Release date: 1999
- Running time: 90 minutes
- Country: Morocco
- Language: Moroccan Arabic

Women's Wiles (Moroccan Arabic: Keid Ensa, French: Ruses de femmes) is a 1999 film directed by Farida Belyazid. The film was screened at multiple Moroccan film festivals as well as the Beirut Film Festival and the Berlin International Film Festival.

== Background ==
The film is based on a Andalusian folk tale "La fille au basilic". The Arabic expression keid ensa means "the cleverness of women" and also appears in a Federico GarcÌa Lorca play.

Generations of women have told this story to their daughters. I also heard it as a little girl. In this film the world of the imagination offers women a plethora of possiblities which are usually suppressed by the traditions of a male-dominated society. There is a prince as in all fairytales but this time the girl is not the object of his capriciousness. Instead, she uses her intelligence like a weapon throughout the film and remains in control of the situation... Since I was free to choose the costumes and the set for this film, a lot of visual possibilities were at my disposal. Also, the different characters change during the course of the film and this allowed the actors a great diversity in their performance. Farida Benlyazid

== Synopsis ==
Lalla Aïcha is the daughter of a rich merchant. Orphaned by her mother, she has always been spoiled by her nurse, Dada, which has made her a capricious young woman. One day, on her terrace, while watering her basil, she meets the sultan's son. He falls in love at first sight but cannot admit that women are as intelligent as men. Lalla Aïcha then undertakes to prove him wrong. But the prince, after marrying her, decides to teach her a lesson by locking her up in his cellar for three years.

== Cast ==
- Samira Akariou (Lalla Aïcha)
- Rachid El Ouali (Le prince)
- Fatma Bensaidane (Dada Mbarka)
- Abderrahim Bayga (Bilal)
- Amina Alaoui (Lalla Mina)
- Hammadi Amor (Haj Madani)
- Mohamed Razine (Haj Tahar)
- Amina Rachid (La Femme de Haj Tahar)
- Abdelkébir Chedati (Karkour)
- Saâdia Azgoun (Laâziza)
