= A Door to the Sky =

- Directed by: Farida Benlyazid
- Starring: Chaabia Laadraoui Eva Saint-Paul Zakia Tahri
- Release date: 1989
- Running time: 107 minutes
- Country: Morocco
- Languages: French, Moroccan Arabic

A Door to the Sky (Arabic: باب السماء مفتوح, romanized: Bab al-Samah Maftuh, French: Une porte sur le ciel) is a 1989 Moroccan film directed by Farida Benlyazid. It is Benlyazid's first feature film.

== Plot ==
Nadia is a young Moroccan woman living in France. Upon the illness and subsequent death of her father, she returns to her native Fez and meets a female Sufi mystic, Kirana. Nadia readopts her native culture and religion, Islam, leaving her French boyfriend, Jean-Philippe. Nadia turns her family's traditional home into a zawiyya, functioning as a shelter for abused and homeless women. Nadia experiences dreams and visions of Ba Sissi, her family's deceased African servant who was known for his mysticism and piety.

Her efforts are opposed by her sister, Leila, and brother, Driss. Under Islamic law, Driss has received double the inheritance she has, entitling him to the home. Nadia has a mystical vision in a trance where she sees the buried jewels of her deceased mother, enabling her to pay off the debt to her brother.

Nadia, now known for her spiritual gifts, is sent to heal an ailing young man, Abdelkrim, and falls in love with him. She permanently leaves the shelter and marries him.

== Themes ==
The film explores themes of feminism, colonialism, identity, and the conflict between modernity and tradition.

== Cast ==
- Chaabia Laadraoui as Kirana
- Zakia Tahri as Nadia
- Eva Saint-Paul as Leila
