= Abderrahim Mettour =

French-Moroccan filmmaker

Abderrahim Mettour is a French-Moroccan filmmaker and editor.

== Filmography ==
=== Feature films ===
==== As director ====
- 2007: Casanayda! (with Farida Benlyazid)

==== As editor ====
- 2007: Nuba of Gold and Light
