= Blood Wedding (1977 film) =

1977 film

- Directed by: Souheil Ben-Barka
- Written by: Souheil Ben-Barka; Federico García Lorca
- Starring: Irene Papas
- Cinematography: Girolamo La Rosa
- Release date: 1977
- Running time: 80 minutes
- Country: Morocco
- Language: French

Blood Wedding (French: Noces de sang) is a 1977 Moroccan drama film directed by Souheil Ben-Barka. The film was selected as the Moroccan entry for Best Foreign Language Film at the 50th Academy Awards, but was not accepted as a nominee. The film is based on the Spanish play by Federico Garcia Lorca.

== Cast ==
- Irene Papas as La mère
- Laurent Terzieff as Amrouch
- Djamila as La fiancée
- Mohamed El Habachi as Le fiancé
- Doghmi Larbi as La père
- Muni as La servante
- Souad Jalil as La femme d'Amrouch
- Naima Lamcharki as La folle
- Mohamed El Baz as Le berger
- Izza Gennini as La voisine

== See also ==
- List of submissions to the 50th Academy Awards for Best Foreign Language Film
- List of Moroccan submissions for the Academy Award for Best Foreign Language Film
