= Autumn of Apple Trees =

- Arabic: خريف التفاح
- Directed by: Mohamed Mouftakir
- Written by: Mohamed Mouftakir
- Produced by: Chamafilm, Janaprod, Avalanche Prod (France)
- Starring: Fatima Kheir, Saad Tsouli, Naima Lemcherki, Mohamed Tsouli
- Cinematography: Raphael Bauche
- Edited by: Leila Dynar
- Music by: Younes Megri
- Release date: 2020
- Running time: 120 minutes
- Country: Morocco
- Language: Moroccan Arabic

Autumn of Apple Trees (French: L'Automne des pommiers) is a 2020 Moroccan film directed by Mohamed Mouftakir. The film opened the National Film Festival in Tangier and was screened at the Cairo International Film Festival.

== Synopsis ==
Slimane is a young boy who has never known his mother, and who has been disowned by his father. He sets out to investigate and find out what really happened before he was born.

== Cast ==
- Fatima Kheir
- Saad Tsouli
- Naima Lamcherki
- Mohamed Tsouli
- Hassan Badida
- Ayoub Layoussoufi
- Anass Bajoudi

== Awards and accolades ==
2020 National Film Festival (Tangier)

- Grand Prize
- Best Image
