= Belle maman =

Belle maman (Step Mother)
- Directed by: Gabriel Aghion
- Written by: Gabriel Aghion (screenplay); Danièle Thompson (screenplay); Jean-Marie Duprez (novel)
- Produced by: Bruno Pésery; Xavier Castano
- Starring: Catherine Deneuve; Vincent Lindon; Line Renaud; Mathilde Seigner; Stéphane Audran; Idris Elba; Françoise Lépine; Artus de Penguern; Danièle Lebrun; Laurent Lafitte; Jean-Marie Winling
- Cinematography: Romain Winding
- Edited by: Luc Barnier
- Distributed by: AMLF
- Release date: 1999
- Running time: 102 minutes
- Country: France
- Language: French
- Budget: US$10.1 million
- Box office: US$7.5 million

Belle maman (Step Mother) is a 1999 comedic French film starring Catherine Deneuve, Vincent Lindon, Line Renaud, Stéphane Audran, Idris Elba (in his debut), Françoise Lépine and directed by Gabriel Aghion. The title translates into English as "mother in law".

== Plot ==
A comedy about the ideal dysfunctional family in modern France, the grandmother is a lesbian, her girlfriend is mentally unstable, her daughter is a free spirit and her granddaughter is a seriously uptight attorney.

Antoine (Vincent Lindon) is all set to marry his pregnant girlfriend, Severine (Mathilde Seigner), when he falls hopelessly in love with her mother, Léa played by Catherine Deneuve. The film is a fun and energetic romantic comedy with a couple of music scenes featuring Catherine Deneuve singing.
