= Djôn'maya =

Song by Victor Démé

from the album Victor Démé
- Released: 2008
- Recorded: 2008
- Label: Chapa Blues
- Songwriter(s): Victor Démé

Music video
- "Djôn'maya" on YouTube

"Djon maya maï"

Single by Synapson featuring Victor Démé
- Released: 2014
- Length: 3:04
- Label: Parlophone (Warner Music)
- Songwriter(s): Victor Démé

Music video
- "Djon maya maï" on YouTube

"Djôn'maya (sometimes simplified as "Djon maya") is a song composed and recorded by Burkinabé singer-songwriter and musician Victor Démé and is considered his signature tune. After years of interpreting the song live, he recorded a studio version in his self-titled debut album Victor Démé in 2008 on the independent Chapa Blues Records in France.

== Djon maya maï ==
In 2014, the Electro, Nu-Disco and Deep House DJ record producers Synapson recorded a remake of the song featuring Victor Démé. The single renamed "Djon maya maï" charted in France and Belgium reaching number 12 in SNEP French Singles Chart.

=== Track list ===
1. "Djon maya maï" (radio edit) (3:04)
2. "Djon maya maï" (original) (3:14)
3. "Djon maya maï" (extended) (4:49)

== Charts ==
Synapson feat. Victor Démé version

| Chart (2014) | Peak position |
|---|---|
| Belgium (Ultratip Bubbling Under Wallonia) | 9 |
| France (SNEP) | 12 |
