= Festival du Cinéma Africain de Khouribga =

Film festival in Morocco

The Festival du Cinéma Africain de Khouribga (FCAK) or African Film Festival in Khouribga is a film festival for African cinema held in Khouribga in Morocco. Established in 1977, it is one of the oldest and most important film festivals in Morocco.

== History ==
Since 1967 a cinema club had existed in Khouribga, with 200 active members and weekly screenings. In 1977, led by Noureddine Saïl, the National Federation of Cinema Clubs in Morocco (FNCCM) helped to organize the Rencontres Cinematographiques de Khouribga. The local cinema club ensured its continued existence. Since Khouribga's main industry is phosphate mining, the club secured funding from the Office of Phosphates. Inspired by internationalist Third Cinema ideals, the cinema club ensured that the festival had a wide African focus.

The third African Film Meeting of Khouribga was held from April 2–9, 1988. With a budget of 900,000 dirhams (630,000 frances), invitations were extended to 100 nationals and about 30 foreigners from Arab, European and African countries. Four government ministers attended the grand opening, and an audience of at least 50,000 watched films from 14 countries. The fourth meeting was held March 17–24, 1990. The sixth meeting was held from 26 March to 2 April 1994.

Since 2004 the FCAK has been run by a Foundation, with Nourddine Saïl as President and Lahoussaine N’douf as executive director.

== Prizes ==
15th edition, 2012

- Ousmane Sembene Award: Bayiri, La Patrie.

16th edition, 2013

- Special Jury Award: Zamora.

17th edition, 14–24 June 2014

- Best Director: Durban Poison.
- Don Quixote prize: Dust and Fortunes.

20th edition, 2017

- Ousmane Sembene Award: A Day for Women.

21st edition, December 2018

- Best Screenplay, Best Supporting Actor: The Mercy of the Jungle.
