= Il était une fois, il était deux fois =

- كان حتى كان واحد المرة حْتى كان زوجْ دالمرات
- Directed by: Bachir Skiredj
- Written by: Bachir Skiredj
- Produced by: Bachir Skiredj
- Starring: Bachir Skiredj, Sanae Kamari, Rachida Saâudi
- Cinematography: Albance Guildinili
- Edited by: Adil Mimdal
- Music by: Ali Amir
- Release date: 2007
- Running time: 118 minutes
- Country: Morocco
- Language: Moroccan Arabic

Il était une fois, il était deux fois (English: Once Upon a Time, Twice Upon a Time, Moroccan Arabic: كان حتى كان واحد المرة حْتى كان زوجْ دالمرات) is a 2007 Moroccan film directed by Bachir Skiredj in his directional debut. It was screened at the 9th edition of the Moroccan National Film Festival held in Tangier.

== Synopsis ==
Maarouf is a cobbler married to a Aisha, an abusive woman, who mistreats him, often attacking him physically. One day, in a fit of rage, Aisha attempts to hit her husband with a cobbler's hammer, but instead, her blow cracks the wall from which appears a genie that ejects Maarouf into a new life in the city of Orlando.

== Cast ==
- Bachir Skiredj
- Sanae Kamari
- Rachida Saâudi
- Emilio Jaramillo
- Even Jaramillo
