= Casablanca, Nest of Spies =

- Directed by: Henri Decoin
- Written by: Jacques Remy; José Antonio de la Loma
- Starring: Sara Montiel
- Cinematography: Christian Matras
- Music by: Gregorio Garcia Segura
- Release date: 1963

Casablanca, Nest of Spies (French: Casablanca, nid d'espions, Spanish: Noches de Casablanca, Italian: Spionaggio a Casablanca) is a 1963 French-Spanish-Italian spy film directed by Henri Decoin and starring Sara Montiel, Maurice Ronet and Franco Fabrizi. Set in 1942 in Casablanca, it was shot in Alicante.

== Plot ==
In 1942, a small group of French Resistance members devises a plan to attack in the Moroccan city of Casablanca, aiming to undermine Nazi Germany's power there. While the French police officer Maurice Desjardins is enjoying himself with some girls, the Resistance group shoots a man in the port, seizing a briefcase containing crucial documents about the Third Reich. Nearby, Andre Kuhn observes the entire operation through his binoculars. Although he pretends to be a businessman, he is actually a spy for the Germans, a fact unknown to his girlfriend Teresa Villar, an attractive Spanish singer who works at the El Dorado nightclub and unwittingly becomes embroiled in the scheme.

== Cast ==
- Sara Montiel as Teresa
- Maurice Ronet as Maurice Desjardins
- Franco Fabrizi as Max von Stauffen
- Leo Anchóriz as Lucien
- José Guardiola as Pierrot
- Gérard Tichy as The Mayor
- Matilde Muñoz Sampedro
- Naima Lamcharki
- Isarco Ravaioli
- Lorenzo Robledo
- Carlo Croccolo
