= The Wretched Life of Juanita Narboni =

- Spanish: La vida perra de Juanita Narboni
- Directed by: Farida Benlyazid
- Written by: Gerardo Bellod
- Based on: La vida perra de Juanita Narboni by Ángel Vázquez
- Starring: Mariola Fuentes; Salima Benmounem; Lou Doillon
- Cinematography: José Luis Alcaine
- Edited by: Pablo G. Plant
- Music by: Jorge Arriagada
- Production companies: ZAP Producciones; Tingitania Films
- Release dates: 19 September 2005 (Zinemaldia); 19 May 2006 (Spain)
- Running time: 101 minutes
- Countries: Morocco; Spain
- Languages: Moroccan Arabic; French; Spanish

The Wretched Life of Juanita Narboni (Spanish: La vida perra de Juanita Narboni), also known as Juanita de Tangier, is a 2005 drama film directed by Moroccan filmmaker Farida Benlyazid and based on the novel of the same name by Ángel Vázquez. It stars Mariola Fuentes alongside Salima Benmounem and Lou Doillon.

== Synopsis ==
Juanita, daughter of an English father from Gibraltar and an Andalusian mother, narrates her life story, mirroring the history of Tangier between the 1940s and 1970s, the period of its zenith as well as its decline as a cosmopolitan city. She recounts the stories of her sister Helena; infatuated with freedom; of Esther, her close Moroccan Jewish friend who has helplessly fallen in love with a Muslim, and of Hamruch, her faithful Moroccan maid who is all the family she has left. In the background of these lives, a series of events happens: the Spanish Civil War and the invasion of Tangier, the Second World War, and the arrival of refugees from Europe. Eventually Juanita finds herself alone with Hamruch in her city. After the independence of Morocco in 1956, it is returning to its Arab origins.

== Cast ==
- Mariola Fuentes as Juanita
- Salima Benmounem as Hamruch
- Lou Doillon as Helena
- Chete Lera
- Nabila Baraka
- Concha Cuetos
- Francisco Algora
- Victoria Mora
- Rosario Pardo
- Amal El Atrache
- Mariana Cordero

== Production ==
The film is a Spanish-Moroccan co-production by ZAP Producciones and Tingitania Films.

== Release ==
The film was presented in the official selection the 53rd San Sebastián International Film Festival on 19 September 2005. It also screened at the National Film Festival in Tangier, in which the film won the Best Supporting Actress Award for Salima Benmoumen. It was released theatrically in Spain on 19 May 2006.

== Reception ==
Deborah Young of Variety deemed the film to be "uninvolving and schematic as it races through 20th century history", while positively mentioning "its real warmth for the city's diversity".

== Awards and accolades ==
- National Moroccan Film Festival (Tangier 2005)

== See also ==
- List of Spanish films of 2006
