= Bab L' Bluz =

Moroccan-French rock band

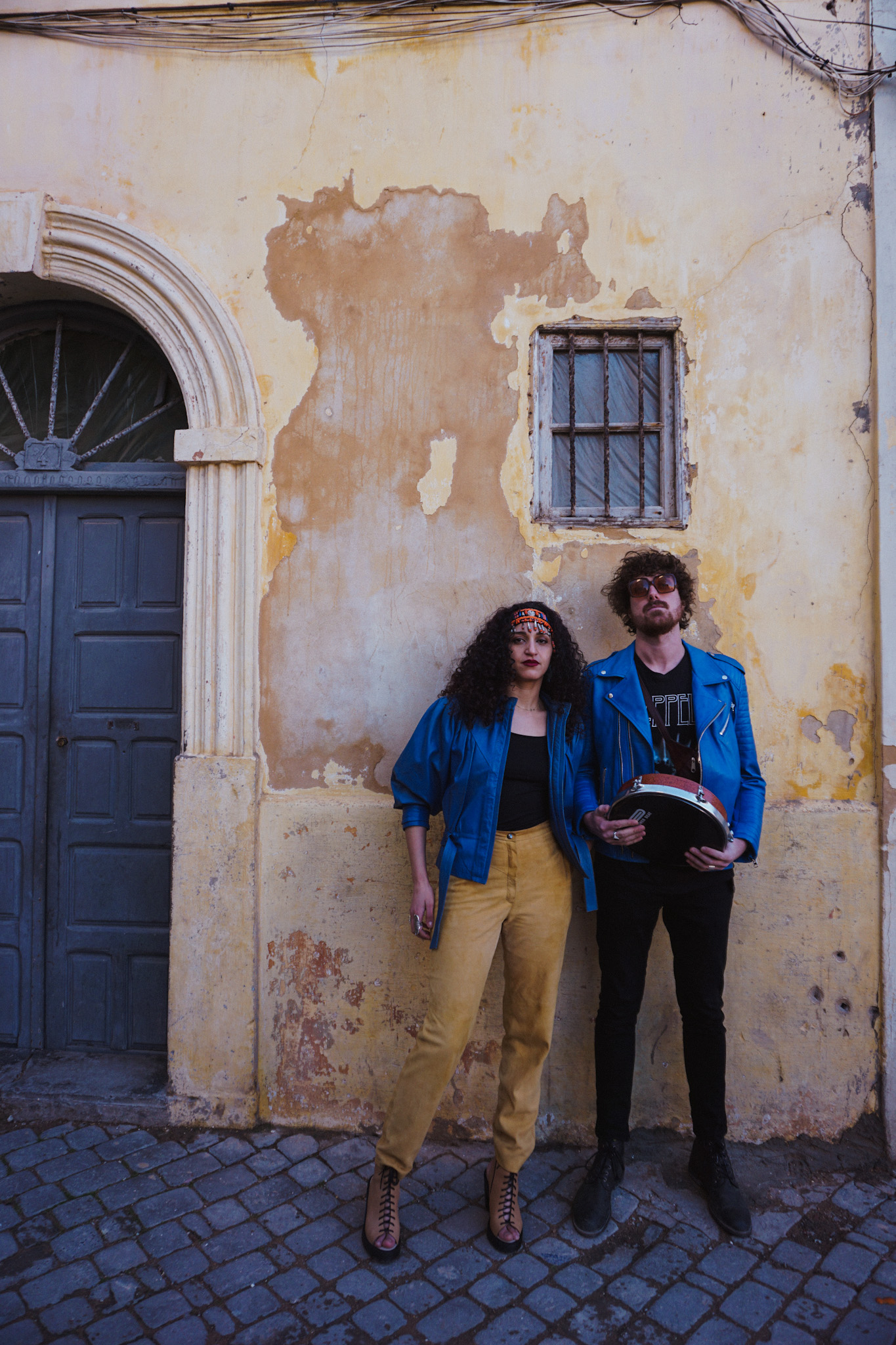
- Bab L' Bluz in the streets of El Jadida

Background information
- Origin: Marrakesh, Morocco
- Genres: Rock; Gnawa music; psychedelia; blues
- Years active: 2018-present
- Labels: Real World; Republic
- Members: Yousra Mansour; Brice Bottin; Brahim Terkemani; Mehdi Chaïb (live)
- Website: https://www.bablbluz.com

Bab L' Bluz (Arabic: باب لبلوز) is a Moroccan-French rock band that was formed in Marrakesh in 2018. The band consists of lead vocalist/ electric awisha (a smaller version of a gimbri) player Yousra Mansour and electric gimbri player and multi-instrumentalist Brice Bottin. As an exponent of the "Nayda" artistic movement in Morocco which places emphasis on local heritage, Mansour provides vocals in the Moroccan Arabic dialect of Darija. Bab L' Bluz take inspiration from a wide range of musical styles such as Gnawa music, blues, Chaâbi, and Afrobeat.

== History ==
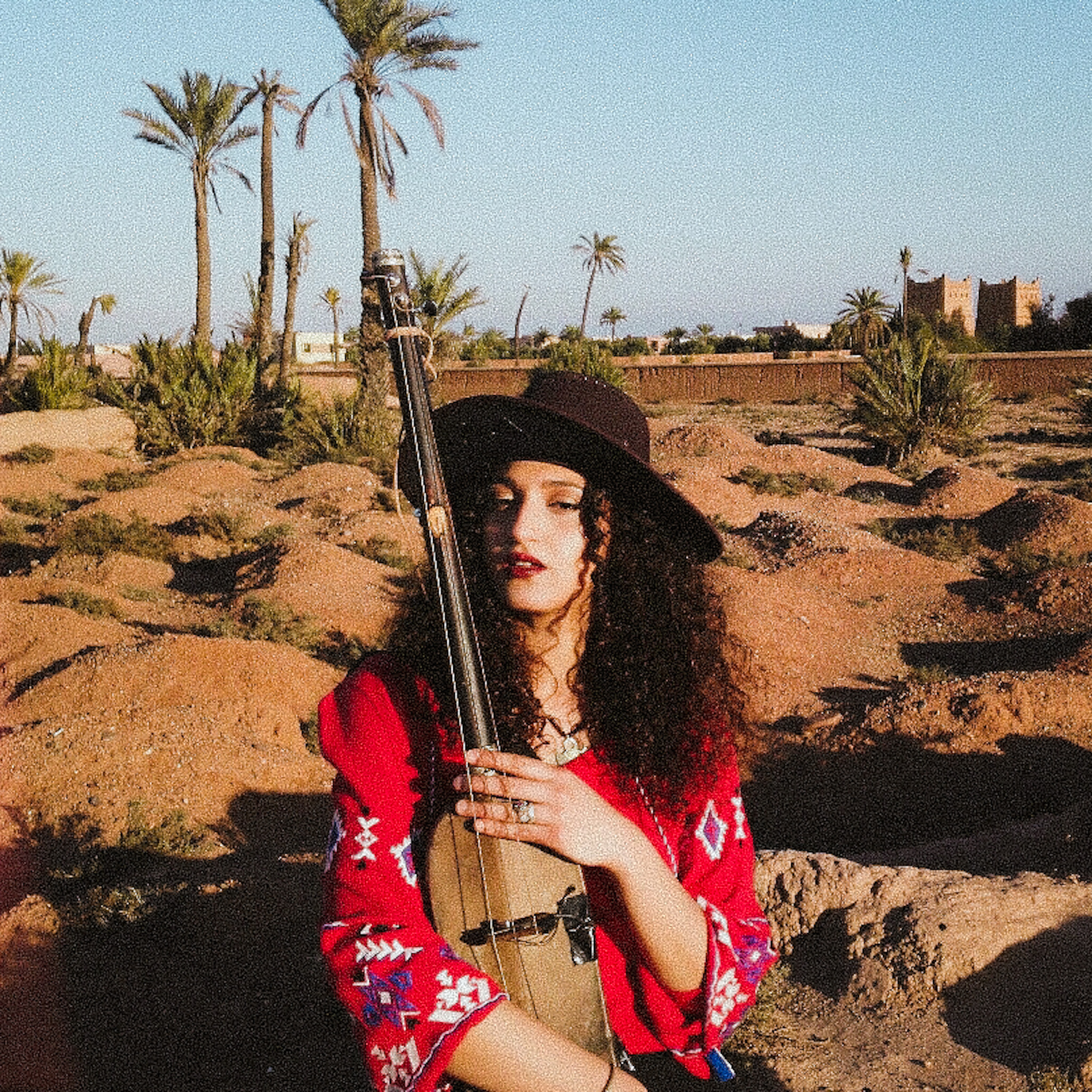
Yousra Mansour

Bab L' Bluz was formed in 2018 by Yousra Mansour and Brice Bottin. Mansour grew up in El Jadida while Bottin was born in Savoie. Bottin held an interest in Moroccan music and had already worked with local artists in Morocco before he met Mansour in 2016. Together they were a part of the Marrakesh Jazz Beat collective and were both interested in the trance sounds of traditional Gnawa instruments like the gimbri and the awicha.

They composed the ten songs that would make up their first album Nayda! in 2017. Nayda! was released on 5 June, 2020 to positive reviews. Critics praised the band for their ability to blend multiple genres together as well as for their faithful representation of Moroccan musical tradition.

In 2021, Bab L' Bluz released the song Waylalah in collaboration with French electro duo Synapson.

Their first performance in the USA was on October 4, 2023 at Joe's Pub in New York City during the Habibi Festival.

In 2024 they released their second album Swaken, described as "ancient-to-future music, rooted as much in psychedelic blues, funk and rock as in the trancey, propulsive rhythms of northern Africa's Maghreb: Gnawa, Amazigh, Hassani and Houara music."

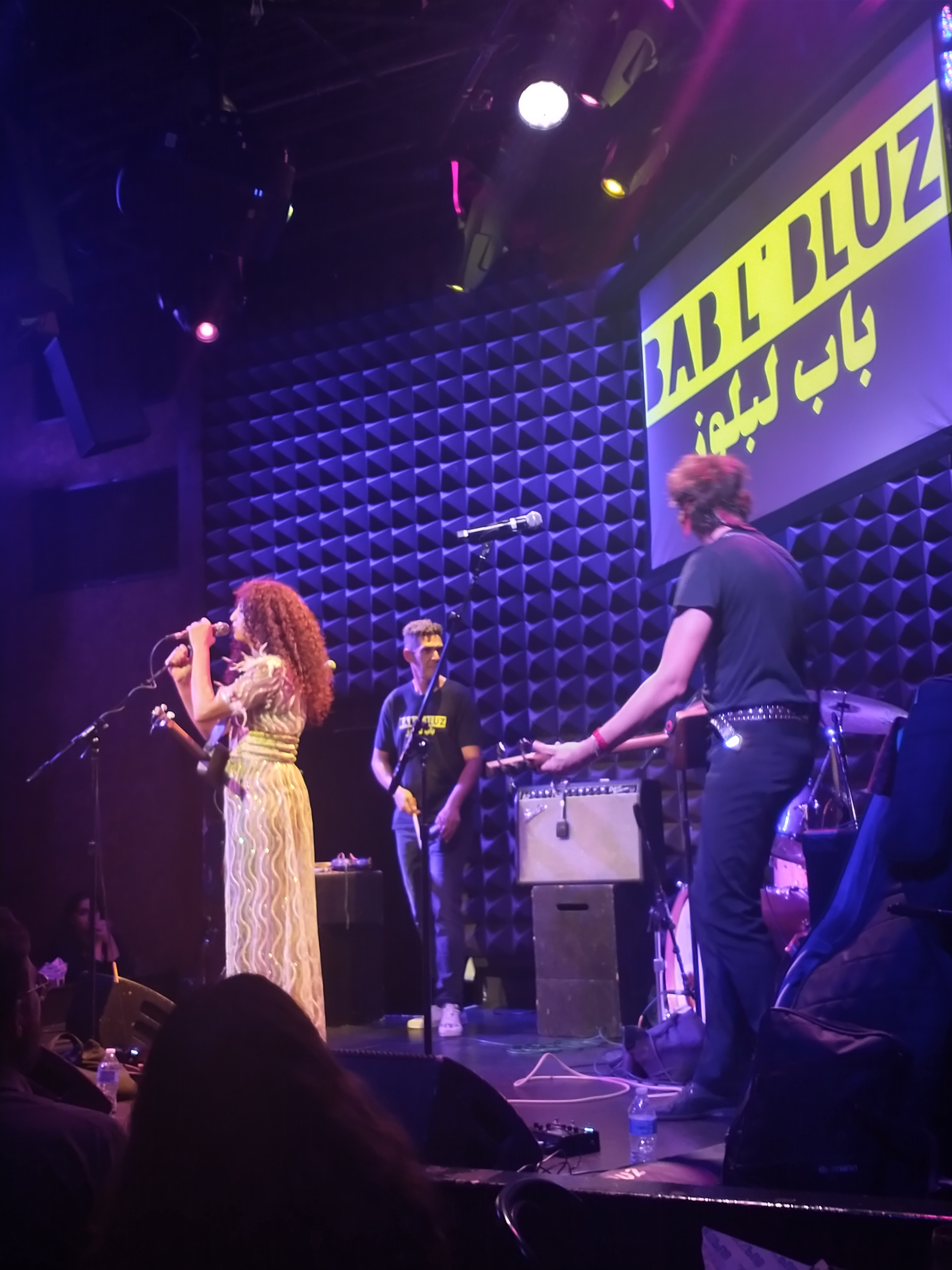
Bab L' Bluz performing

== Influences and inspirations ==
Bab L' Bluz take major inspiration from blues music. The band's name literally translates as "gateway to the blues" in Arabic. Bottin stated that "We wanted to remember that the blues, so closely linked to America, stems from African music." He elaborated that “The African blues includes other pentatonic music: Mauritanian hassani, the Berber music found in Morocco’s Atlas Mountains, the music of Mali, which is the true source of the blues, as well as the true source of Gnawa music.”

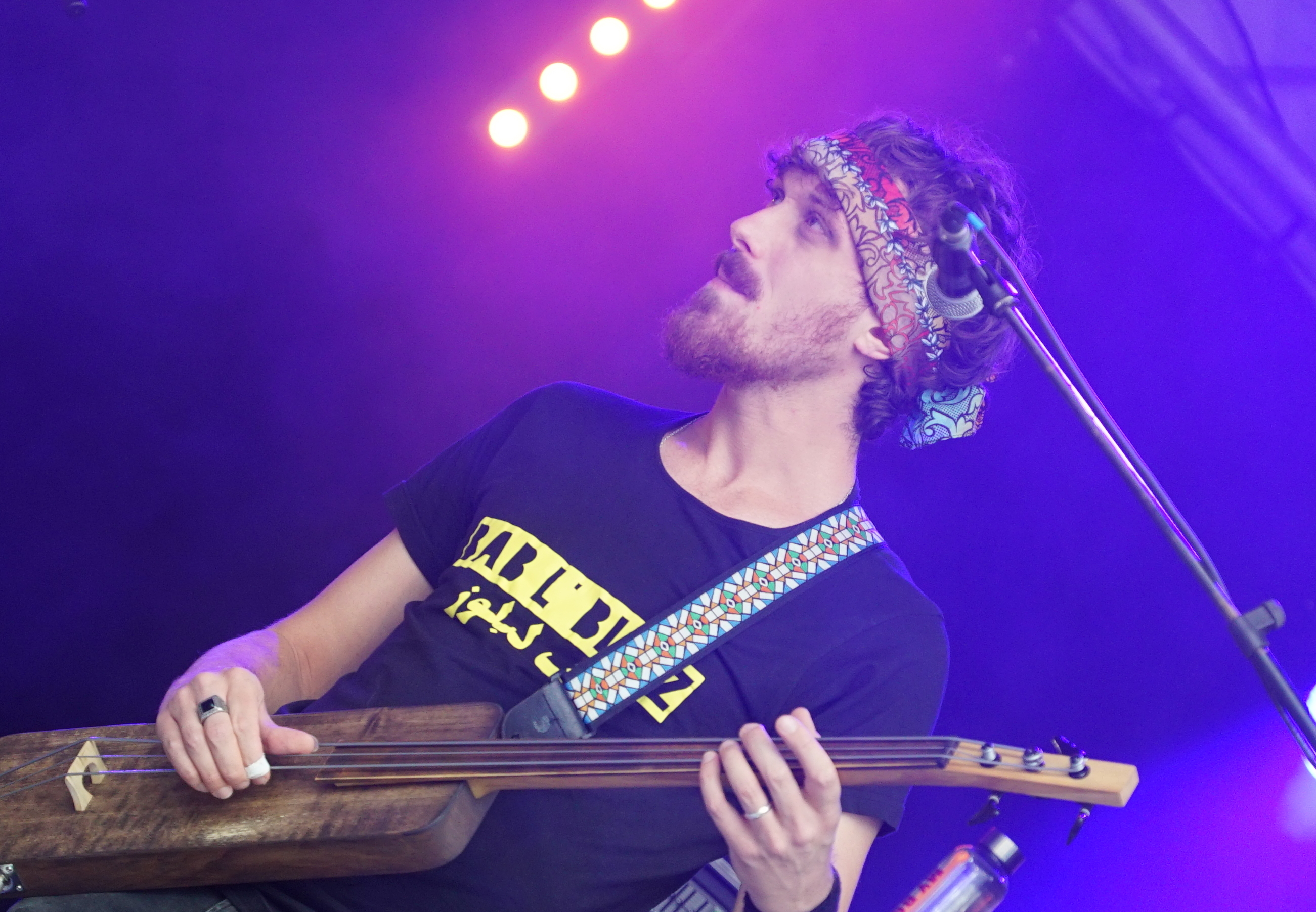
Brice Bottin

The band frequently pay homage to and collaborate with various North African artists. Nayda! features a cover of the poem Waydelel, which was originally written by famous Mauritanian musician Dimi Mint Abba. Their song El Watane features vocals from fellow Gnawa artist Mehdi Nassouli.

As a teenager, Mansour attended the Gnaoua World Music Festival in Essaouira every year with her parents. She credits this as the reason for her love of Gnawa music and African blues. She also cites Hamid El Kasri and Nass El Ghiwane as influences on the sound of Bab L' Bluz. Mansour is a feminist, and explains that she has faced criticism for choosing a career in music as a woman. She mentions female musicians such as Oumou Sangaré and Fairouz as being a positive influence on her.

Despite the range of genres and influences they draw from, Mansour has stated that "More than anything we’re a rock band, we use the awicha as a guitar and the gimbri as a bass, both at different tunings. We channel our huge range of influences into music that crosses borders and travels through time.”

== Discography ==
=== Albums ===
Title	Details
Nayda!	Released: 5 June 2020; Label: Real World Records; Format: CD, LP, digital download
Swaken	Released: 10 May 2024; Label: Real World Records; Format: CD, LP, digital download
