= Gabriel Aghion =

French film director and screenwriter

- Born: 30 December 1955 (age 70); Alexandria, Egypt
- Occupations: Film director, screenwriter

Gabriel Aghion (born 30 December 1955) is a French film director and screenwriter.

Aghion was born in Alexandria, in Egypt on 30 December 1955.

He is openly gay.

== Biography ==
Gabriel Aghion comes from an Egyptian Jewish family and was born in Alexandria, Egypt. His parents moved to Paris when he was four years old.

He is best known for his film Pédale douce, a major hit in 1996. He has enjoyed renewed success with Belle maman, a comedy starring Catherine Deneuve and Vincent Lindon.

He went on to adapt a play by Éric-Emmanuel Schmitt, Le Libertin, starring Vincent Perez, and a film inspired by the British television series Absolutely Fabulous, starring Josiane Balasko and Nathalie Baye.

In 2004, he returned to the theme of homosexuality with Pédale dure, a pseudo-sequel to Pédale douce, which was a box-office and critical flop. Since then, he has worked primarily in television.

== Selected filmography ==
- La Scarlatine (1983)
- Bras de Fer (1985)
- Rue du Bac (1990)
- Pédale douce (1996)
- Belle maman (1999)
- Le Libertin (1999)
- Absolument fabuleux (2001)
- Pédale dure (2004)
- Un autre monde (TV) (2011)
- Manon Lescaut (TV) (2013)
- Avec le temps (TV) (2014)
- Diabolique (TV) (2016)
