= In Search of My Wife's Husband =

- Directed by: Mohamed Abderrahman Tazi
- Written by: Farida Ben Lyazid
- Starring: Mohamed Afifi, Abderrahim Bargach, Ahmed Taïeb El Alj, Mouna Fettou
- Cinematography: Federica Ribes
- Edited by: Kahéna Attia
- Music by: Abdelwahab Doukkali, Chritian Baldos
- Production companies: ATA, Canal+ Horizons, Cinétéléfilms, Radio Télévision Marocaine (RTM), Touza Productions
- Release date: 1993
- Running time: 88 minutes
- Country: Morocco
- Language: Moroccan Arabic

In Search of My Wife's Husband (French: À la recherche du mari de ma femme) is a 1993 Moroccan comedy film directed by Mohamed Abderrahman Tazi and written by Farida Belyazid. It was screened at multiple national and international film festivals., where it won a number of prizes. It is one of Morocco's most popular domestic films, reaching approximately a million spectators. Lalla Hobby is the film's sequel.

== Synopsis ==
An unrepentant womanizer, polygamist Hadj Benmoussa lives in the old medina of Fez with his three wives, who maintain fairly good relations between themselves within their household. When he suspects his favorite wife Houda of flirting with a younger man, he divorces her for the third time in a sudden fit of jealousy, but soon comes to regret it. But Islamic law is intractable on the matter: Hadj Benmoussa will be able to marry Houda again only if another man makes her his wife and divorces her in his turn...

== Cast ==
- Bachir Skiredj (Hadj Ben Moussa)
- Mouna Fettou (Houda)
- Naïma Lamcharki (Lalla Rabea)
- Amina Rachid (Lalla Hobby)
- Fatima Moustaid (Tamo)
- Lalla Mamma (Houda's mother)
- Mohamed Afifi (Houda's father)
- Ahmed Taïeb El Alj (jeweler)
- Abderrahim Bargach (tailor)
- Mahdi Kotbi (the second husband)
- Fatima Mernissi
