= Victor Démé =

Burkinabé singer-singwriter and musician

Victor Démé (1962 – 21 September 2015) was a Burkinabé musician and singer-songwriter originating from a Mandinka family. His death was caused by a bout of malaria.

== Biography ==
Victor Démé was born in Bobo-Dioulasso, Burkina Faso. His mother was a popular singer in social occasions in her hometown in the 1960s. His father was a tailor and stylist and with his uncles and aunts promoted a line of clothing unique to Marka ethnics, part of West Africa's Mandinka people. Démé worked in his father's business established in Abidjan, Ivory Coast since his youth. During the nights, he used to perform at various clubs of Abidjan with musicians, most notably the famous band Super Mandé and its star artist Abdoulaye Diabaté.

Démé returned to Burkina Faso in 1988 benefiting from a renewed artistic freedom in the country and at age 26 gained fame. His appearance in a special contest by the Bobo-Dioulasso French Cultural Centre rebroadcast by Radio France International in 1989 and winning the top prize at the National Culture Week in Burkina Faso in 1990 solidified his fame. In the 1990s, he was nominated for the prize on several occasions. He played with renowned orchestras including l'Echo de l'Africa and with Suprême Comenba famous in Ouagadougou.

In later years, he was cut off from arts and had a very tough time returning to the clubs singing covers of classics from Salif Keita, Mory Kanté and others. Nevertheless, he never gave up writing his own materials, bridging a friendship and collaboration with Camille Louvel, the manager of Ouagajungle, a small bar in Ouagadougou that organized collaborative concerts for many talents. In 2007, journalist David Commeillas ran a reportage on Ouagadougou music and mentioning Démé at length which encouraged him to release his debut studio album at age 46 featuring best of his materials in folk and blues, romantic mandinka tunes influenced at times with Latin salsa and flamenco sounds using Dyula language, a Mande language used in Burkina Faso, Ivory Coast and Mali. The texts appealed for national solidarity, respect of women, importance of culture and showcasing the richness of his music repertoire and composition. The self-titled 2008 album Victor Démé included very notably his best known song "Djôn'maya".

The French producers Camille Louvel and David Commeillas hoped to distribute his album throughout Europe and facing obstacles from the major record labels and through Soundicate activists Romain Germa and Nicolas Maslowski, founded an independent record label, Chapa Blues Records, and signing Victor Démé as the first main artist with sales of the album passing 40,000 copies. The British magazine Songlines chose it the "best album of the year 2008". In France the album reached number 76 in the SNEP Albums charts. In addition to France, Démé also performed in other world music venues in UK, Germany and throughout Europe, releasing his second album Deli in 2010 also on Chapa Blues Records. That album peaked at number 138 on French charts.

== Discography ==
=== Albums ===
Year	Album	Peak positions
Year	Album	FR
2008	Victor Démé	76
2010	Deli	138

=== Singles ===
Year	Single	Peak positions	Album
Year	Single	FR	Album
2010	Djôn'maya	–	Victor Démé

Featured in

Year	Single	Peak positions		Album
Year	Single	FR	FR	Album
2014	"Djon maya maï" (Synapson feat. Victor Démé)	12	9 (Ultratip)	
