= Mohamed Abderrahman Tazi =

Moroccan filmmaker

Mohamed Abderrahman Tazi محمد عبدالرحمن التازي
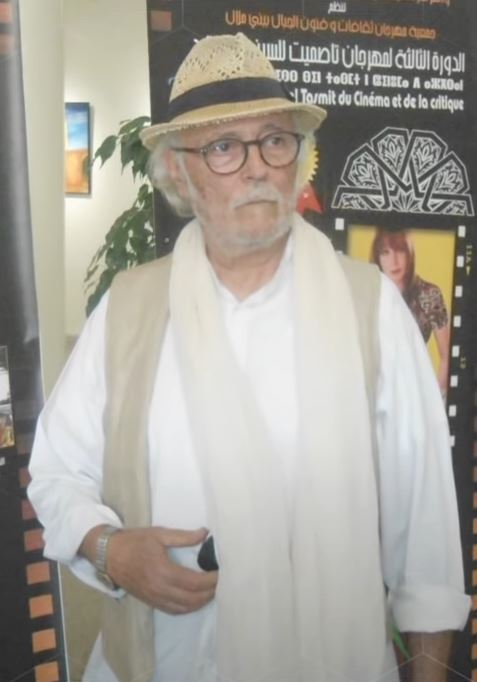
- Born: Mohamed Abderrahman Tazi; 3 July 1942 (age 84); Fez, Morocco
- Education: Institut des hautes études cinématographiques Syracuse University
- Occupations: Director; producer; screen writer, cinematographer
- Years active: 1983–present

Mohamed Abderrahman Tazi (Arabic: محمد عبد الرحمن التازي; born 3 July 1942), is a Moroccan filmmaker, screenwriter and cinematographer. Tazi has made several critically acclaimed films including 6 et 12, Le Grand Voyage, Les voisins d'Abou Moussa and Al Bayra, la vieille jeune fille.

== Personal life ==
He was born on 3 July 1942 in Fez, Morocco. In 1963, he graduated from the Institut des hautes études cinématographiques (IDHEC) in Paris. Then in 1974, he studied communication at the Syracuse University, New York.

== Career ==
In 1964, he produced the documentary Sunab and then the short film Tarfaya, ou la marche d’un poète in 1966. Then in 1967, he worked as the director of photography in the film Quaraouyne and then in 1968 film Du côté de la Tassaout. In 1968, he directed his maiden film 6 et 12.

In 1979, he created the production company "Arts et Techniques Audio-visuels". Later, he became the producer and director of cultural programs for Moroccan Television and Spanish Television. Before the cinema direction, Tazi worked as the technical advisor for the films by Robert Wise and John Huston filmed in Morocco.

In 1981, he made his first feature film Le Grand Voyage. Then in 1989, he directed and produced critically acclaimed film Badis. With the success of the film, he made In search of my wife's husband in 1994 and Lalla Hobby in 1997. From 2000 to 2003, Tazi was appointed as the Director of productions at the Moroccan television channel 2M TV.

Apart from cinema, he later wrote the book Beyond Casablanca.

== Filmography ==
Year	Film	Role	Genre	Ref.
1964	Sunab	Director	documentary	
1966	Tarfaya, ou la marche d’un poète (Tarfaya, or the walk of a poet)	Director	short film	
1967	Quaraouyne	Cinematographer	film	
1968	Du côté de la Tassaout (On The Side of Tassaout)	Cinematographer	film	
1968	6 et 12	Director	film	
1968	Vaincre pour vivre (Win to Live)	Cinematographer	film	
1971	Wechma (Traces)	Cinematographer	film	
1971	Fantasia du siècle	Director	film	
1977	March or Die	Production Supervisor	film	
1978	Adieu Philippines	Director	film	
1978	Silver Bears	Location manager	film	
1981	Le Grand Voyage (The Great Journey)	Director	film	
1982	Lialat shafia (Healing machine)	Director	film	
1983	The Black Stallion Returns	Location manager	film	
1986	Eabaas 'aw juha lam yamut (Abbas or Juha did not die)	Director, writer	film	
1987	Aux portes de l’Europe	Director	film	
1989	Badis	Director, writer	film	
1991	La plage des enfants perdus (The Beach of Lost Children)	Production director	film	
1994	À la recherche du mari de ma femme (Looking for My Wife's Husband)	Director	film	
1995	Voleur d’images	Director	film	
1997	Lalla Hobby (No, my love)	Director	film	
2000	Au-delà de Gibraltar	Executive producer	film	
2003	Moi, ma mère et Bétina (Me, My Mother and Betina)	Producer	TV film	
2003	Les voisins d'Abou Moussa (The Neighbors of Abou Moussa)	Director	film	
2005	Les tourments de Coverin (The Torments of Coverin)	Director	film	
2005	Mehayin D Haussain	Director	film	
2006	Fouad Souiba	Actor	documentary	
2011	Houssein et Safia	TV series	film	
2013	Al Bayra, la vieille jeune fille (Al Bayra, The Old Maid)	Director	film	
2013	Hnia Moubara O Masood	Director	TV sitcom	
2015	La promotion (The Promotion)	Director	film	
2018	Les extras (The Extras)	Director	film	
2022	Fatema, La Sultane Inoubliable	Director	film	
