= Farida Benlyazid =

Moroccan film director

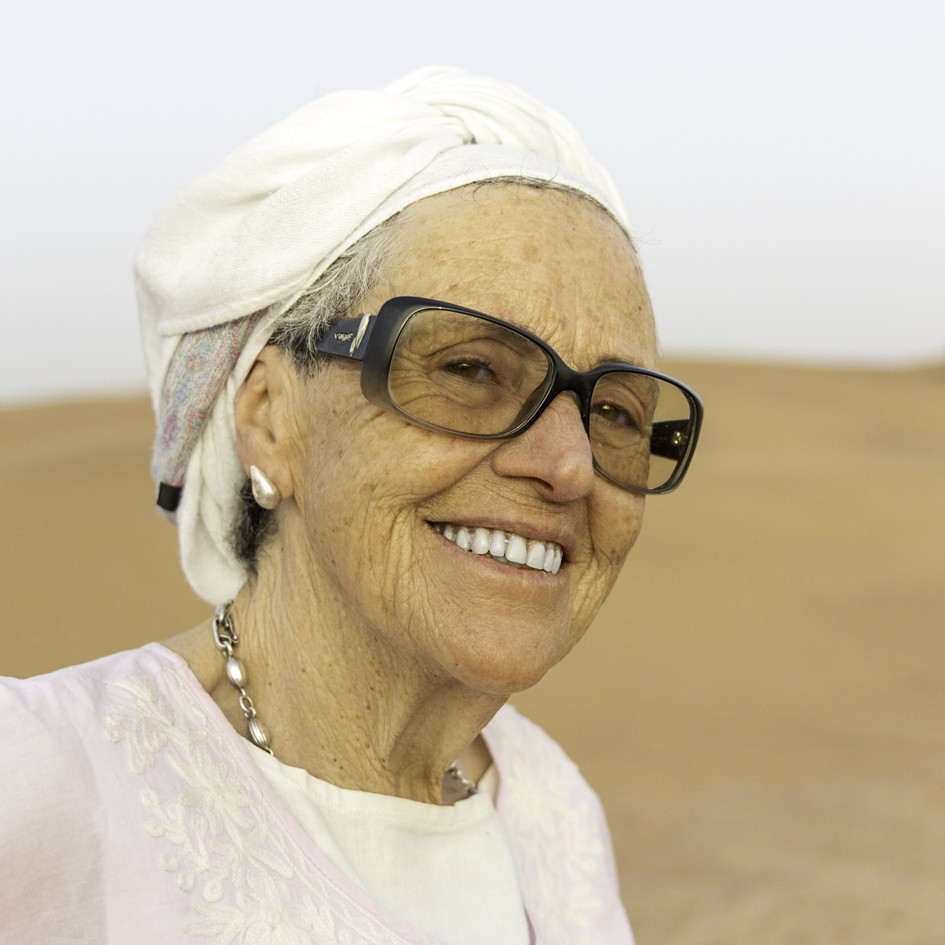
- Born: 10 March 1948 (age 78); Tangier, Morocco
- Occupations: Film director, Screenwriter, Film producer, Film critic, Director

Farida Benlyazid (born March 18, 1948, Tangier, Morocco) is a Moroccan scriptwriter, producer, production manager, novelist, and director. She began working in the field of cinema and cinematic production in the seventies. According to Sandra Gayle Carter, author of What Moroccan Cinema? : A Historical and Critical Study, Benlyazid continues to be one of the few Moroccan women in the field. From the start of her career up until 2003, she was one of the few female filmmaker in Morocco. Benlyazid's films, novel adaptations, documentaries and scripts have garnered much international recognition. She has become known for representing the struggles and obstacles faced by Moroccan women and incorporating her own personal experiences into her scripts and films.

Carter further states that the relationships between gender, society, and religion are articulated in Benlyazid's work, which represents women as multi-dimensional and individualist, each defined by their own age, class, and personal and cultural upbringing.

== Early life and education ==
Farida Benlyazid's interest in the world of cinema began at a young age, inspired by her mother's intrigue. Her childhood played a role in the formation of her future films. For example, Benlyazid grew up in Morocco speaking with her mother in Spanish and her father in Arabic, resulting in the formation of a multicultural identity. This has shaped her outlook on life and has influenced the majority of her films. Known for her complex constructions of the Moroccan woman in her films, Benlyazid's incorporates several autobiographical components into her scripts.

Longing for education and the ability to travel, Benlyazid was restricted by her then-husband who, due to the Moroccan interpretation of Islamic law prior to the nineties, was the only one who could file for a divorce. After a long legal battle, she divorced in 1971 with two children to support. The same year, she left Morocco and moved to France. She first attended the University of Paris VIII where she studied French Literature, and then the École Supérieure des Études Cinématographiques (ESEC) to study cinema from 1974 to 1976.

Benlyazid earned her bachelor's degree in Film and Literature from the University of Paris in 1976. She later received her master's degree from the Ecole Supérieure des Etudes Cinématographiques in Paris. Immediately following her graduation, she started writing films.

== Career ==
In 1979 Benlyazid's film career began in France where she directed Identités de femmes, a short piece about women immigrants in France. Two years later, when she moved back to Morocco during the time of the repressive Years of Lead, the country had a weak film industry. She joined a group of motivated filmmakers and ultimately began her career as a scriptwriter, producer, documentary filmmaker, assistant director, and a production manager.

By 1989, Benlyazid produced her first feature film, A Door In The Sky, though this was not her first cinematic work. In 1981, she produced the film and wrote the screenplay for Cane Dolls (Poupees de Roseau) with her second and now ex-husband Jillali Ferhati and wrote the script for Mohammed A. Tazi's Badis (1986). Three years after her first feature film, she wrote another script for the film Looking for My Wife's Husband in 1992. Since then, Benlyazid has continued to produce, direct, and write both films and documentaries. She has directed a total of six movies, written a total of five movies, produced a total of two movies, and created two documentaries. In 1991 she created her own production company called "Tingitania Films," coming from the ancient name of Tangier, Tingis.

As a journalist, Benlyazid authored two short stories and has written politically as a journalist and critic in journals and magazines including Kantara, Le Libéral, El Mundo, and Autrement.

Her most popular films include Bab al-sama' maftooh (1989), Keïd Ensa (1999) and Nia taghled (2000).

Benlyazid remains to be one of few women in Morocco who are directing, producing and scriptwriting for films, as family and social support remain to be a challenge for many hoping to pursue careers in film. At the start of her career, no national film fund existed in Morocco due to a history of colonisation by the French which delayed the nationalisation of the Moroccan film industry, presenting a clear barrier to produce film. According to Florence Martini, Benlyazid is considered throughout the Middle East and North Africa to have challenged traditional institutions and beliefs in Morocco by neglecting to impose any forms of self-censorship when portraying the monarchy or religion. Other obstacles for Moroccan women wishing to pursue film like Benlyazid may include pay, according to Benlyazid herself who claims, "We have no market here and it is difficult to get financing. Everytime I apply for a project, I get less money than the men do."

=== Filmography ===
==== As a scriptwriter ====
- Arayiss men / Kasab Poupées de Roseau / Cane Dolls (1981)
- Badis 1564 (1986)
- A la recherche du mari de ma femme / Looking for the Husband of My Wife (1993)
- L’Histoire d’une rose / A Story of a Rose (2007)

==== As a director/producer ====
- Bab al-sama' maftooh / Une Porte sur le Ciel / Door to the Sky (1989)
- Aminata Traoré / Une femme de Sahel / Woman of the Sahel (1993)
- Sur la terrace / On the Terrace (1995)
- Kayd Insa / Ruses de femmes / Women's Wiles (1999)
- Casablanca (2002)
- La Vida perra de Juanita Narboni / La Chienne de vie de Juanita Narboni / The Wretched Life of Juanita Narboni (2005)
- Casanayda / Casa ça bouge / Casa Is Rocking (2007)
- Through the Blooming Valley's (2016)

== Representation of Women and Islam ==
Common themes in Benlyazid's films include the multidimensional and complex portrayals of Moroccan women. Scholars such as Sandra Gayle Carter state this representation stems from Benlyazid incorporating her own personal philosophies on gender, humanity, and religion into her scripts and films. Carter argues that although Benlyazid received a Western education, the director's feminist approach to the representation of Moroccan women's struggles is anything but eurocentric. Benlyazid characters, when faced with problems in Moroccan society, resolve them through a form of female liberation rooted in Moroccan culture and beliefs.

Her films focus on the role of Moroccan women from the time of Moroccan independence in 1956 through the present day. In most of her films, there is a strong connection between Islam and feminism. Most of her female characters use Islam as a way to guide their own feminist identities and philosophies. In her films, Islam is always portrayed as a soft image and a religion that boasts equality between men and women. She uses common techniques of Islamic feminists in her films, including the rewriting of old myths and stories by giving women their own voices. Her films emphasize the important role of women and their contribution to Moroccan society. Besides gender inequality and gender roles, her films also analyze Moroccan society and focus on issues of social and political power, as well as colonialism. Her films are more popular in Western cultures than in Morocco, so her films subtly critique Moroccan culture, society, and colonialism, but are never directly negative.

Her first feature film, A Door in the Sky, a highly debated and controversial film in both the West and in the Arab world, portrays a tension between tradition and modernity and a French and Moroccan identity. According to Mustapha Hamil, in the characters journey of self-discovery and understanding in this film, Islam is shown to be compatible with modernity, as Islamic culture is merged with a feminist consciousness. In this way, both the traditional aspects of Islam and the modern teachings of Western feminism help form and realise the main characters identity as Benlyazid adapts neither a wholly Eastern or Western approach, but rather merges the two. In a review of the film by Viola Shafik in Arab Cinema, History and Cultural Identity, Shafik notes that A Door in the Sky appreciates traditional aspects of Islam and Western approaches to feminism, which in fact have a long-held tradition in Islamic culture and can be used in female self realisation.

== Bab al-sama' maftooh ==
Bab al-sama' maftooh (in English, "A Door to the Sky") is one of Benlyazid's most popular dramas, produced in 1989. It was released in France, Morocco, and Tunisia.

=== Summary ===
The main character in Bab al-sama' maftooh, Nadia, leaves Paris for her native home in Fez, Morocco to see her dying father. At his funeral, she meets a woman, Kirana, who is reciting verses from the Qur'an. Nadia is moved by her readings, and the two women become close friends. Through Kirana, Nadia starts to embrace her Moroccan heritage as well as her Muslim culture and identity as her new Western habits start to recede. The pivotal point in Nadia's reformation is when she breaks up with her Parisian boyfriend. Later, Nadia wishes to turn her father's home into a zawiya (a shelter and spiritual center for women) but her siblings want to sell the home. However, Nadia ends up buying her deceased father's property from her siblings and turns the home in a zawiya. Bab al-sama' maftooh is one of the first post-colonial feminist films.

=== Analysis ===
Bab al-sama' maftooh uses Islam as a form of spiritual revelation. The film doesn't approach the religion radically, which allows the film to circulate in Western culture seamlessly. However, Moroccan film critic, Hamid Tbatou, states that some parts of the film are orientalized, and he specifically points out the type of architecture. Since the film plays into Western perceptions and stereotypes, this could potentially be a reason why it's more popular in Western culture than it is in Morocco.

== Keïd Ensa ==
Keïd Ensa (in English, "Women's Wiles") was produced in 1999, and is one of Benlyazid's most well-known films.

=== Summary ===
Keïd Ensa is based on a traditional Andalusian myth. The main character, Lalla Aicha, is a woman who learned how to read and write from her father. The son of the sultan quickly falls in love with Lalla, but he doesn't believe that women are or should be as intelligent as men. To combat this, Lalla sneaks into his home and shaves off his beard to prove that she is capable of being smart and cunning. The two marry, and the sultan's son is still convinced of a woman's inferiority, so he locks her in the basement for three years to punish her for shaving his beard. For the rest of the film, Lalla works to find out ways to outwit him.

=== Analysis ===
Benlyazid pulls from a traditional myth as inspiration for this film. She focuses on the retelling of an old myth and works to give women a voice in a culture that believes women are inferior to men. Since Lalla always finds a way to best her husband, she becomes the superior, more intelligent one, proving that women are just as capable as men. In many ways, Benlyazid uses a Scheherazadian method of creating a story where the woman outwits the man in their relationship.
