= Ruth F. Davis =

British ethnomusicologist, writer and university lecturer

- Born: 21 May 1952 (age 74)
- Education: University of London, (BMusic) Princeton University, (MFA, PhD)
- Occupations: Ethnomusicologist, witer and university lecturer
- Years active: 1987-present
- Employer: Corpus Christi College, Cambridge
- Known for: Ethnomusical research of the music of Tunisia, the Middle East and the Mediterranean
- Notable work: Ma'luf: Reflections on the Arab Andalusian Music of Tunisia, The Oriental music broadcasts, 1936-1937: a musical ethnography of Mandatory Palestine.
- Awards: Association for Recorded Sound Collections (ARSC) Award of Excellence
- Honours: Life Fellow of Corpus Christi College, Cambridge

Ruth Frances Davis (born 21 May 1952) is a British ethnomusicologist, university professor and writer, whose focus is the music of North Africa, the Middle East and the wider Mediterranean. An emeritus professor and Life Fellow of Corpus Christi College at the University of Cambridge, she was the first scholar in the United Kingdom to hold a designated position in ethnomusicology.

Davis is known for her fieldwork and publications on the music of Tunisia, including the Tunisian musical genre ma'luf and the songs of the Jewish community of the island of Djerba. Her edition of ethnomusicologist Robert Lachmann's lectures and recordings of Oriental music broadcasts for the Palestine Broadcasting Service (PBS) in the late 1930s received an award of excellence by the Association for Recorded Sound Collections.

== Life and career ==
=== Academic career ===
Davis earned her Bachelor of Music (Hons.) at the University of London and her Master of Fine Arts and PhD at Princeton University in 1987 with a thesis on Modern Trends in the Ma'luf of Tunisia. She begann her academic career as Reader in Ethnomusicology at Corpus Christi College, Cambridge, where she was one of the first female Fellows and the first Fellow of the college for studies in musicology. The Lectureship in Ethnic Musics at the college established for her was the first designated ethnomusicology position in the United Kingdom.

=== Research and scholarly activities ===
Concert by the Rachidia orchestra in Tunis, 2009

==== The Tunisian ma'luf ====
The Arabic word ma'luf means 'familiar' or 'customary'. Like similar Arab-Andalusian musical genres in Morocco (al-Ala), Algeria (Gharnati and sanaa), and Libya, ma'luf had its origins in the Islamic courts and cities of medieval Iberia (Al-Andalus). Following the Christian Reconquista, this musical tradition reached the Maghreb through the migration of Muslim and Jewish refugees.

During 1982 and 1983, Davis did field research for her PhD in Zaghouan, Sidi Bou Said and Testour, a village known for its Andalusian musical tradition. She recorded ma'luf played both by younger and established musicians, including performances of the 1982 Ma'luf Festival of Testour. Apart from these, she also recorded concerts by the Rachidia musical society.

In 1984, Davis published her research on Jewish songs from the island of Djerba in Tunisia. Several of her later works have focused on the Arab-Andalusian musical genre ma'luf in Tunisia, including its role in the country's modern cultural policy. In her PhD thesis of 1986 and her 2004 book Ma'luf: Reflections on the Arab Andalusian Music of Tunisia, Davis described the history and character of the ma'luf as it developed in the 20th century. In particular, she focused on the Tunisian version of the nuba, the modal suite of the Andalusi tradition and the poetic character of songs. She described how standardized musical notation based on traditional live performances in Sufi gatherings and cafés were introduced for the Rachidia orchestra and how these versions became part of Tunisia's national cultural heritage. As Davis observed, since the 1980s other musicians have revived the ma'luf repertoire by returning to earlier forms of smaller, more improvisational ensembles. In cities such as Testour, ensembles performed versions based on traditional performances again and all-female ma'luf ensembles were formed. According to the publishers, her study included the genre's "musical aesthetics, personalities, institutions and myths, through a century of modernization and change."

==== Robert Lachmann's recordings in Mandatory Palestine ====
At the 2004 conference of the International Council for Traditions of Music and Dance, Davis presented her work about the music of the Jews of Djerba as well as German ethnomusicologist Robert Lachmann's recordings of music in Mandatory Palestine, including "connections with Jewish and Muslim communities of mainland Tunisia and the wider Middle East." Lachmann had studied the music of the Jewish community of Djerba in the 1920s and his Jewish Cantillation and Song in the Isle of Djerba was published posthumously in 1940.

==== Other activities ====
From 2010 to 2011, Davis worked at the Yale Institute of Sacred Music and edited a collection of studies titled Musical Exodus: Al-Andalus and Its Jewish Diasporas. In 2013, she edited the lectures and historical metal disc recordings of North African and Middle Eastern music made by Lachmann for the Palestine Broadcasting Service (PBS) in 1936-1937. In her introductory pages, she described how her interest in Lachmann’s work had been aided by her encounter with Lachmann's nephew Peter Lachmann in Cambridge in the 1990s. Further, she pointed to connections with the Thesaurus of Hebrew Oriental Melodies, the first extensive study on the oral music traditions of the Jews of the Middle East by Abraham Z. Idelsohn (1882–1938).

Further, Davis has studied popular songs and oral history of the Tunisian Jewish diasporic communities in France. She is associated with the Research Centre of Ethnomusicology (CREM-CNRS) at the Paris Nanterre University which established a "Fonds Ruth Davis" with digitized copies of her field recordings in Tunisia and bibliographical references to her publications. She has served as Chairperson of the International Council for Traditional Music Study Group for Mediterranean Music Studies and as editor for the music section of the Encyclopedia of Islam (third edition). She has also authored radio broadcasts for the BBC and international radio stations.

== Awards and recognition ==
- Association for Recorded Sound Collections (ARSC) Award of Excellence for her edition of Robert Lachmann's Oriental Music Broadcasts, 1936-1937, (2014)
- British Forum for Ethnomusicology (BFE) conference in honour of her career (2025)

== Selected publications ==
=== as author ===
- Davis, Ruth Frances (1984). "Songs of the Jews on the Island of Djerba. A Comparison Between Two Surveys: Hara Sghira (1929) and Hara Kebira (1978)". Musica Judaica. 7 (1). American Society for Jewish Music: 23–33. ISSN 0147-7536. JSTOR 23687911.
- Modern Trends in the Ma'luf of Tunisia. (PhD Dissertation, Princeton, 1986), University of Michigan, Ann Arbor, 1986, OCLC no. 233865962.
- Davis, Ruth (1997). "Cultural Policy and the Tunisian Ma'luf: Redefining a Tradition". Ethnomusicology. 41 (1): 1–21. doi:10.2307/852576. JSTOR 852576.
- Ma'luf: Reflections on the Arab Andalusian Music of Tunisia. Bloomsbury Publishing PLC. 2004. ISBN 978-0-8108-5138-2.
- Jews, Women and the Power to Be Heard: Charting the Early Tunisian Ughniyya to the Present Day. Laudan Nooshin (ed.), Music and the Play of Power in the Middle East, North Africa and Central Asia. Farnham and Burlington: Ashgate Publishing, Ltd., p. 187-205, 2009.
- Davis, Ruth F. (1 December 2010). "Ethnomusicology and Political Ideology in Mandatory Palestine: Robert Lachmann's "Oriental Projects"". Music and Politics. IV (2). doi:10.3998/mp.9460447.0004.205. hdl:2027/spo.9460447.0004.205. ISSN 1938-7687. (with audio examples of Lachmann's radio programmes)
- Music in the Mirror of Multiple Nationalisms: Sound Archive and Ideology in Israel and Palestine, in Philip Bohlman (ed.): The Cambridge History of Music. Cambridge: Cambridge University Press, 2013.
- Davies, Ruth F. (26 February 2024). "From Wax Cylinder to Metal Disc: Transplanting Robert Lachmann's "Oriental Music" Project from Berlin to Jerusalem on the Eve of World War II". The World of Music (New Series). 12 (2). doi:10.59998/2023-12-2-1428. ISSN 2941-3680.
- Levi, Erik; Scheding, Florian, eds. (25 March 2010). "Time, Place and Memory: Songs for a North African Jewish Pilgrimage". Music and Displacement: Diasporas, Mobilities, and Dislocations in Europe and Beyond. Bloomsbury Publishing PLC. pp. 71–88. ISBN 978-0-8108-7410-7.

=== as editor ===
- The Oriental music broadcasts, 1936-1937: a musical ethnography of Mandatory Palestine. Middleton, Wisconsin, A-R Editions, 2013, ISBN 978-0-89579-776-6.
- Musical exodus: Al-Andalus and its Jewish diasporas. Europea: Ethnomusicologies and modernities. Lanham, Maryland: Rowman and Littlefield. 2015. ISBN 978-0-8108-8176-1.
- with Oberlander, Brian S. (2022). Music and Encounter at the Mediterranean Crossroads: A Sea of Voices. New York, NY: Routledge, Taylor & Francis Group. ISBN 978-0-367-44248-4.

== Reception ==
On the occasion of the 2025 BFE conference in honour of her career, she was called a "towering figure" and an "early pioneer" who has "influenced various generations of scholars". Peer reviews of her book on the Tunisian ma'luf appeared in the Yearbook for Traditional Music and Ethnomusicology Forum. Her book about Robert Lachmann's Oriental Music Broadcasts, 1936-1937 was positively reviewed in Musica Judaica Online Reviews,The World of Music, Cahiers d’ethnomusicologie, Ethnomusicology Forum and Cambridge University Press.

Her annotations for Lachmann's lectures have been called "a fascinating biographical sketch of one of the field’s most prominent comparative musicologists." Apart from her descriptions of Lachmann's project, she has been credited with shedding light on "the humanity of Lachmann’s professional and personal relationships." Another review saw her work as "extraordinarily rich in their contextualization of each lecture’s musical, ethnomusicological, and historical substance." Further comments mentioned her work's "critical importance", noting that her "balance of analytical depth and accessible presentation is a task that few scholars are equipped to carry out within such a broad field.

A review of Ma'luf: Reflections on the Arab Andalusian Music of Tunisia appreciated the work as an "invaluable" entry and "the first book in English about any of the Andalusi musical traditions of North Africa." Further, Davis was credited for describing changes since the early twentieth century, including the growing importance of secular associations such as the Rachidia and of new forms of public performances. Her other observations refer to the historical changes of ma’luf since the 1930s during Tunisia's colonial era, when nationalist elites started an early national cultural movement. During this time, ma’luf could publicly be heard on the radio in addition to the live performances of earlier times. Davis also wrote about the influential role of Baron Rodolphe d’Erlanger, a European musicologist specializing in Arab music, who lived in Tunisia until his death in 1932. Referring to these changes in performance and social attitudes towards the genre, Davis referred to ma’luf in the twentieth century "as a kind of invented tradition."

== See also ==
- Ethnomusicology
- Al-Ala music in Morocco
- Gharnati music
- Sanaa music
- Ma'luf in Libya
