= Shams al-'Ashiya =

Traditional Andalusi song and poem

- Original title: شمس العشية
- Language: Andalusi dialectical Arabic
- Genre: Andalusi zajal
- Form: Andalusi nawba

"Shams al-'Ashiya" (Arabic: شمس العشية, lit. 'The Evening Sun') is a piece of Andalusi nawbah, a form of strophic poetry. It's one of the most popular songs sung on holidays and celebrations in Morocco especially Eid al-Fitr.

== Composition ==
The musician and researcher specializing in Moroccan musical heritage, Abdeslam Khaloufi, classifies it as a sana'a (صنعة) of Mizān Qudām al-Māya (ميزان قدام الماية), or Nawbat al-Māya (نوبة الماية). It is a piece of zajal poetry, meaning that it is in Andalusi dialectical Arabic rather than Standard Arabic. It spread throughout Morocco, though its author/composer is unknown.

== Renditions ==
This piece is a standard of Andalusi music and has been performed by many major Moroccan ensembles, including: the National Broadcast Ensemble led by Moulay Ahmed Loukili, the al-Barihi Ensemble led by Abdelkrim Rais, and the Ensemble of the Institute of Music in Tetuan led by Mohamed Larbi Temsamani. The rendition by Mohamed Bajeddoub is also very popular.

Recently, it has also been reinterpreted by Nabyla Maan.

== Content ==
The subject of the poem is the setting sun, which can be interpreted as a metaphor for the departure or loss of a friend or loved one.

The piece also attests to historic trade relations between the region and the Venetian Republic, as the song mentions "al-Awani l-Bunduqiya" (الأواني البندقية, "the Venetian glassware") imported from Venice.
