= Abdessadeq Cheqara =

Moroccan musician

Abdessadeq Cheqara عبد الصادق شقارة
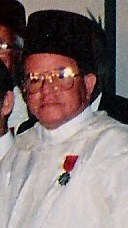

Background information
- Born: 17 octobre 1931; Tetouan, Morocco
- Died: October 1998 (aged 66–67) Tetouan, Morocco
- Instruments: Vocals, violin
- Years active: 1947–1998

Abdessadeq Cheqara (17 october 1931 – 31 October 1998) (in Arabic: عبد الصادق شقارة) was a Moroccan singer of traditional Andalusian classical music and Moroccan folk music. Known as the grand master of al-Ala (Andalusian music), he was also a violin and oud virtuoso.

His first name is also written Abd el Saddeq, Abdessadek, Abdesaddek, and many other variations. His surname is variously spelt Chekara, Cheqara, Chqara, Sheqara, Shekara, Shkara, and variations thereof.

== Life ==
Abdessadeq Cheqara was born in Tetuan, Morocco. His father, Abdessalam Cheqara, was a singer and musician in Tetuan, while his mother, Assoudia Alharrak, was descended of a family of poets, musicians and philosophers.

From a young age, Cheqara was drawn to music and poetry, being influenced by his father, who gave him his first oud.

Cheqara sang Andalusian and traditional Moroccan folksongs in mawawil (improvised solo), inshad (solo) styles.

Cheqara did much to popularize Andalusian music. Prior to the advent of Abdessadeq, Andalusian music was largely elite music for Andalusians alone.

Much of the Andalusian popular songs or Cha'abi (Sha'abi) are believed to have been appropriated from female Andalusian musicians of Tetuan such as Hajja Shili and Hajja Shahaba. Because of sexism, they were not permitted to record or perform if any males were present and are henceforth not well known. Reportedly Abdessadeq Chekara used to sit with Hajja Cha'haba and Hajja Shili and learn the women's songs, only to go on to record them. Many of the popular Andalusian songs (such as Ben't Bladi) are written from a women's perspective.

== Death ==
Abdessadeq died on 31 October 1998, after a prolonged illness.

== Legacy ==
His work in preserving and developing the Andalusian legacy continues with fellow Tetuani, Tarik Banzi of Al andalus ensemble, or Radio Tarifa.

== Records and events ==
Other notable achievements include:

- In 1961, Cheqara recorded eight nawbas of Andalusian Music in association with UNESCO's Andalusian Music Fans Association – an initiative to preserve the Andalusian heritage of Morocco.
- In 1978, Cheqara was appointed Supervisor General of the National Conservatory.
- In 1982, Cheqara met Professor Jose Heredia in Granada, Spain, and collaborated to produce one of his most famous songs, Bent Bladi, a combination of Tétouani music and flamenco.
- In 1991, Cheqara collaborated with British-Jewish pianist Michael Nyman, releasing a CD titled "The Upside-Down Violin" (1992). The CD was recorded live at the 1992 World's Fair in Seville.
- Abdesadaq Cheqara Melodías de una vida • Melodies of a life time (historical recordings) PN-620

== See also ==
- Mohamed Bajeddoub
- Mohammed al-Haik
