= Arco Iris =

Arco Iris (Spanish: rainbow) or Arco-Íris (Portuguese, 'rainbow') may refer to:

== Places ==
- Arco-Íris, São Paulo, Brazil
- Arco Iris, Panama

== Music ==
- Arco Iris (band), an Argentine rock group, and the name of their first album
- Arco Iris (Skybox album), 2006
- Arco Iris (Amina Alaoui album), 2011
- Arco Iris, a 2011 album by Atomic Garden
- "Arco-Íris", a 1986 song by Carlos Paião
- "Arcoiris", a song by J Balvin from Colores, 2020

== See also ==
- Rainbow (disambiguation)
- Rainbow kick, a trick used in association football
