= Matrouz (music) =

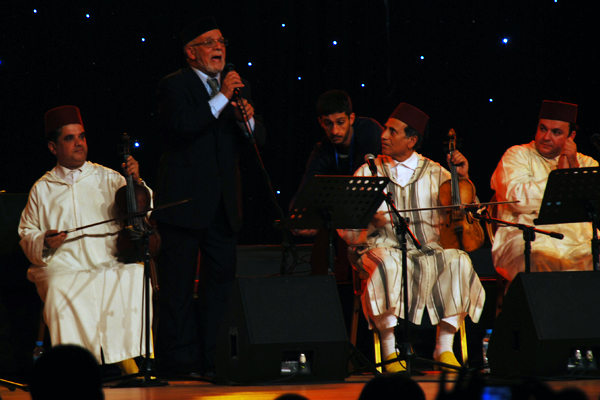
- Haim, an emblematic figure of the Matrouz.
- Native name: المطروز
- Cultural origins: Andalusian, Arab, Jewish

Matrouz (Arabic: مطروز) is a Judeo-Arabic musical practice with origins traced to Andalusia. It was often practiced by Jewish Andalusians, mixing verses in Hebrew and Arabic. Matrouz represents an artistic connection between different cultures, taking inspiration from the overlap of Jewish, Muslim and Christian culture in Andalusia.

Matrouz is an Arabic word that means "embroidered", referencing the insertion of Arabic stanzas into Hebrew poetry.

== See also ==
- Andalusian classical music
- Sanaa (music)
