= Kunnash al-Haik =

Songbook by Mohammed al-Haik

- Author: Mohammed al-Haik
- Original title: كناش الحائك
- Language: Arabic

Kunnash al-Haik (Arabic: كناش الحائك) is a songbook composed by Mohammed al-Haik in the late 18th century. It is a seminal text of tarab al-āla (طرب الآلة lit. "joy of the instrument"), popularly referred to as Andalusi music.

== Editions ==
The vizier Muhammad Ibn al-'Arabi al-Jāmi'i of the court of Hassan I released a derivative work known as Kunnash al-Jāmi'i. Abdelkrim Rais published an edition under the name Min Wahi r-Rabāb (من وحي الرباب) in 1989.

Idrīs Bin Jellūn at-Twīmī also published a revised edition of Kunnash al-Haik.
