= Amina Alaoui =

Moroccan singer: interpreter of Andalusian classical music

Amina Alaoui أمينة العلوي
- Born: 1964 (age 61–62); Fez, Morocco
- Occupation: Singer
- Instrument: Vocals

Amina Alaoui (Arabic: أمينة العلوي; born 1964) is a Moroccan interpreter of Andalusi classical music. She sings in Arabic, Classic Persian, Haketia, Spanish, and Portuguese.

Amina was born in 1964 in a traditional family in Fez, Morocco. At the age of six, she started to learn Andalusi classical music in her own family environment. She learned to play the piano and was initiated in European classical music by the conductor Mohamed Abou Drar. She also studied at the conservatory of Rabat from 1979 to 1981 with Ahmed Aydoun and Mohammed Ouassini, as well as modern dance with Marie-Odile Loakira and classical ballet with Vera Likatchova.

Alaoui went to school at Lycée Descartes and studied philology and Spanish and Arabic linguistics at the University of Madrid and the University of Granada.

== Andalusian classical music ==
While studying in Granada, Alaoui did research on Arab-Andalusi and oriental music and specialized in Andalusi classical music, specifically in the Gharnati (Arabic for "of Granada") style of music. She moved to Paris in 1986, where she continued her practical studies with Rachid Guerbas and Ahmed Piro. There she also studied European Medieval music with Henri Agnel and Persian classical music with Djalal Akhbari. In 2011 she released Arco Iris (ECM), which bridged musical traditions of Portuguese fado, Spanish flamenco, and Persian and Arab-Andalusi classical music.

== Discography ==
- Gharnati: Musique arabo-andalouse du Maroc (1995)
- Alcántara (1998)
- Gharnati: En Concert (2009)
- Siwan (2009, ECM) with Jon Balke
- Arco Iris (2011, ECM)

=== Collaborations ===
- Lluís Llach: Un Pont de Mar Blava (1993)
- Rachid Taha: Diwan (1998)
- Music From The Heart of the World: Sounds True Anthology (2000)
- Women's Sacred Chants (2003)
- Rachid Taha: Diwan Live in Concert (2005)
