= Zainab Afailal =

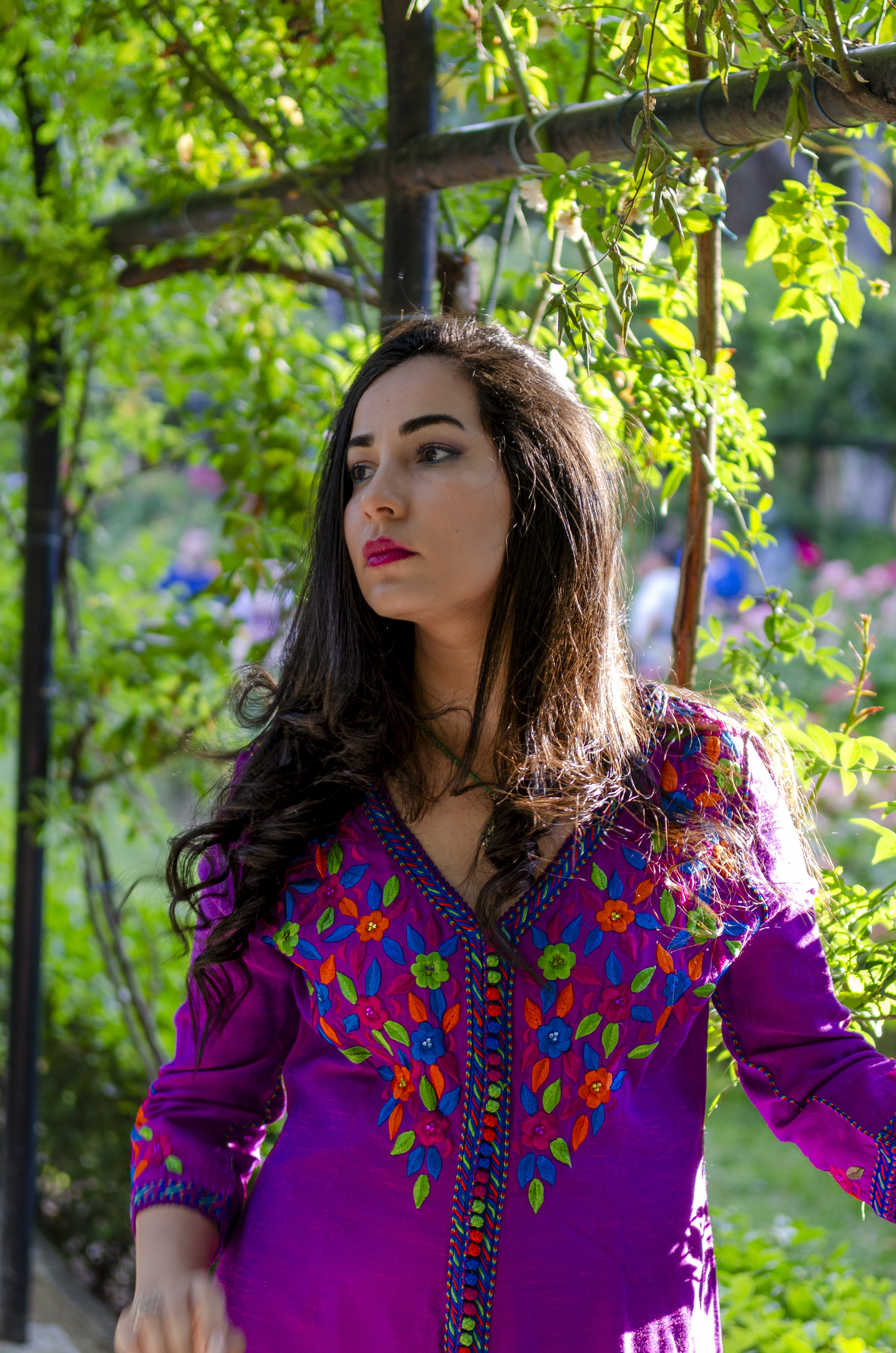

Background information
- Born: October 31, 1990 (age 35); Tetuan, Morocco
- Education: PhD in Chemical Engineering, University of Zaragoza (CUM LAUDE)
- Genres: Andalusian Music, Moroccan classical music
- Occupations: Singer, Chemical engineer
- Years active: 1996–present
- Label: Independent
- Website: https://zainabafailal.com

Zainab Afailal (born 31 October 1990 in Tetuan, Morocco) is a Moroccan singer and chemical engineer, known for her contributions to Andalusian music and for preserving its heritage both nationally and internationally.

== Biography ==
Zainab Afailal was born in Tetuan in 1990. From an early age, she showed interest in music and began learning musical notation and singing at the age of six. She started her formal musical education at the conservatory of Tetuan under the guidance of Professor Mohamed Amin Al Akrami. She later became the lead singer of the Andalusian Music Group of Tetuan, a position rarely held by Moroccan women.

== Career ==
Afailal has performed with Andalusian music groups from various regions, appearing in multiple concerts and festivals in Morocco and abroad. She has participated in several operas, films, and documentaries, primarily focusing on Andalusian music. In 2017, she released her first self-produced solo album, Atlaftani.

== Education ==
Apart from her musical career, Afailal holds a PhD in Chemical Engineering, specializing in biomass valorization and biofuels. She graduated with CUM LAUDE honors from the University of Zaragoza, Spain. She currently works as a biomass expert engineer in a large European energy company and resides in Belgium.

== Discography ==
- Atlaftani (2017) – solo album
