= Arco Iris (Amina Alaoui album) =

Studio album by Amina Alaoui
- Released: June 20, 2011
- Recorded: April 2010; Auditorio Radiotelevisione Svizzera; Lugano, Ticino, Switzerland
- Genres: Vocal music, Folk music, World music
- Length: 67:13
- Labels: ECM; ECM 2180
- Producer: Manfred Eicher

Professional ratings
Review scores
Source	Rating
Allmusic	4/5 stars

Arco Iris is an album by singer Amina Alaoui. The album, Alaoui's first work for ECM, is focused on singing and features light string accompaniment along with sparse percussion. It was recorded in April 2010 in Lugano and released in 2011. The New York Times termed the recording as "a fusion of different traditions to form her own Iberian Peninsula". It also noted the album's references to musical traditions of Portuguese fado, Spanish flamenco, Persian and Arab-Andalusian classical music.

== Track listing ==
1. "Hado" - 1:50
2. "Búscate En Mí" - 6:31
3. "Fado Al-Mu'tamid" - 5:30
4. "Flor De Nieve" - 4:07
5. "Oh Andaluces" - 6:55
6. "Ya Laylo Layl" - 9:18
7. "Fado Menor" - 5:26
8. "Búscate En Mí, Var." - 5:32
9. "Moradía" - 3:59
10. "Las Morillas De Jaén" - 7:05
11. "Que Faré" - 4:26
12. "Arco Iris" - 6:34

== Personnel ==
- Amina Alaoui - vocals, daf
- Saïf Alah Ben Abderrazak - violin
- Eduardo Miranda - mandolin
- José Luis Montón - flamenco guitar
- Sofiane Negra - oud
- Idriss Agnel - percussion
