= Abdelkrim Rais =

Moroccan musician

Abdelkrim Rais عبد الكريم الرايس
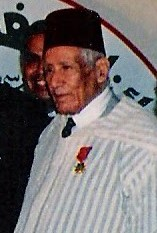

Background information
- Born: 1912; Fez, Morocco
- Died: August 1996 (aged 83–84) Fez, Morocco
- Genre: Andalusian Music
- Instrument: Rabab
- Years active: 1945–1996

Abdelkrim Rais (Fez 1912 – August 30, 1996) (in Arabic: عبد الكريم الرايس) was a Moroccan writer and musician of traditional Andalusian Music. Known as the captain of al-Ala (Andalusian music), he was also a Rebab (spiked fiddle) virtuoso.

== Life ==
Abdelkrim Rais was born in 1912 in the old town of Fez in Morocco. He was encouraged by his family to engage in Andalusian Music and started learning at the musical conservatory of his hometown, while working in his father's printing press, one of the first in Morocco.

In 1946, and after the death of his master Mohammed Al Brihi, he took over the leadership of the Arabo-Andalus Orchestra of Fez. The Orchestra was dedicated to the preservation, transmission and authentic interpretation of Arabo-Andalusian music; a repertoire which originated at the end of the Reconquista period (15–16th centuries), when Muslims and Jews were expelled from Spain.

In 1969, Rais became the director of the Academy of Music of Fez, and remained the city's Orchestra lead until his death in 1996 at the age of 84. The orchestra has continued since then under the direction of Mohamed Briouel.

== Books ==
In parallel with his musical career, Abdelkrim Rais published several writings that had a major influence on the evolution of contemporary Moroccan Andalusian music. Those include:

- Booklet – Introduction to the bases of Andalusian Music (1970), used by the ministry of culture in Morocco.
- Inspirations from Al-Haik Songbook Poems (1982).
- Collection and documentation of all Andalusi nubas, co-written with Mohamed Briouel (1986).

== See also ==
- Mohamed Bajeddoub
- Mohammed al-Haik
