= Siwan (album) =

Studio album by Jon Balke
- Released: 2009
- Recorded: 2007/08
- Studio: Rainbow Studio; Oslo, Norway
- Genre: Jazz
- Length: 52:12
- Label: ECM; ECM 2042
- Producer: Manfred Eicher

Jon Balke chronology
Book of Velocities (2006)	Siwan (2009)	Say and Play (2011)

Siwan is an album by pianist Jon Balke recorded in 2007/08 and released on ECM in 2009.

== Reception ==
The AllMusic review by Thom Jurek awarded the album 4½ stars stating "Every track here reveals something unusual, brings something hidden and alien to the fore even as it beguiles the listener with its intimacy of secret histories and knowledge. Siwan is Balke's masterpiece thus far, and will hopefully become as influential as it is groundbreaking."

Professional ratings
Review scores
Source	Rating
Allmusic	4.5/5 stars

== Track listing ==
All compositions by Jon Balke with lyrics by Amina Alaoui

1. "Tuchia" - 4:56
2. "O Andalusin" - 2:25
3. "Jadwa" - 5:17
4. "Ya Safwati" - 5:17
5. "Ondas Do Mar de Vigo" - 4:30
6. "Itimad" - 6:43
7. "A La Dina Dana" - 3:27
8. "Zahori" - 4:56
9. "Ashiyin Raïqin" - 4:16
10. "Thulâthiyat" - 10:04
11. "Toda Ciencia Trascendiendo" - 12:23

== Personnel ==
- Jon Balke – keyboards, conductor
- Amina Alaoui – vocal
- Jon Hassell – trumpet, electronics
- Kheir-Eddine M'Kachiche – violin
- Helge Andreas Norbakken – percussion
- Pedram Khavar Zamini – zarb

Barokksolistene:

- Bjarte Eike – violin, leader
- Per Buhre, Peter Spissky, Anna Ivanovna Sundin, Milos Valent – violin
- Rastko Roknic, Joel Sundin – viola
- Tom Pitt – cello
- Kate Hearne – cello, recorder
- Mattias Frostensson – double bass
- Andreas Arend – theorboe, archlute
- Hans Knut Sveen – harpsichord, clavichord
