= Palestine Institute of Folklore and Ethnology =

Defunct organisation (1944–1948)

The Palestine Institute of Folklore and Ethnology was formed by Raphael Patai in Jerusalem in 1944. The Institute produced a journal series, Edoth (Hebrew: "Communities"), of which only three volumes were published (the last one in May 1948). The Institute published a series of monographs as well and was a unique enterprise in mandatory Palestine.

Having failed to receive a post at the Hebrew University, Patai pursued his own way in order to fill the void of ethnographic research carried out in Palestine. The Institute was formed after a series of discussions that took place in the Jerusalem community house. Patai was nominated as the Institute's director; the presidents of the Institute were Dr. Rabbi Max Grunwald, who is recognized by many as the founder of the study of Jewish folklore; Chief Rabbi Ben-Zion Meir Hai Uziel, a leading figure of the Jerusalem Sephardic community; Yitzhak Ben-Zvi who later became Israel's second president. Rabbi Y. L. Zlotnick (Avidah) became the Institute's fourth president at a later stage.

The Institute was centered on Patai's figure with contributors from the Jewish community in Palestine as well as anthropologists from abroad (mainly from the UK and the United States). When Patai left Palestine after receiving a Viking Fund scholarship, he settled in the US and the Institute vanished by the end of 1948. Various attempts to revive it (notably by Zlotnick and the ethnomusicologist Edith Gerson-Kiwi) failed.

The Institute's correspondence is stored today at the archives of the Jewish National and University Library.
