= Mohammed al-Haik =

Ibn Abdallah Mohammed ibn al-Hussein al-Haik (Arabic: ابن عبد الله محمد بن الحسين الحائك, romanized: Ibn ʿAbd Allāh Muḥammad ibn al-Ḥusayn al-Ḥāʾik; born in Tétouan, Morocco) was a Moroccan poet, musician and author of a songbook (el-kunash) comprising eleven nubas, that had been handed down for generations. The songbook, written in 1789, doesn't include the musical notation of the songs and is the single most important source on the early tradition of Classical Andalusian music. It also contains the names of the authors of the poems and melodies. The book has been republished by Abdelkrim Rais in 1982.

== See also ==
- Andalusian classical music
- Mohamed Bajeddoub
- Abdessadeq Cheqara
- Abdelkrim Rais
