= Edith Gerson-Kiwi =

Israeli musicologist and university lecturer (1908-1992)

- Born: 13 May 1908; Berlin, German Reich
- Died: 15 July 1992 (aged 84); Jerusalem, Israel
- Citizenship: German (later revoked by Nazi Germany), Israeli
- Education: Heidelberg University, Bologna University
- Occupations: Ethnomusicologist, university lecturer
- Years active: 1934-1980s
- Employer(s): Hebrew University of Jerusalem, Tel Aviv University
- Known for: Studies of Arab-Jewish music
- Awards: Honorary president of the Israel Musicological Society

Edith (Esther) Gerson-Kiwi (13 Mai 1908 - 15 July 1992) was a German-born Israeli musicologist. She was one of the founders of her academic discipline in Israel and is mainly known for her work as ethnomusicologist, including the musical traditions of the Oriental Jews who immigrated to Israel.

== Life and career ==
=== Early life and education ===
Edith Kiwi was born in Berlin as the daughter of an assimilated well-to-do German-Jewish family. Her father Rudolph Kiwi (1874–1965) was a medical doctor, her mother Ella Nanny Loewenthal (1883–1946) worked as a social worker. Gifted with a talent for music, she studied piano from 1918 to 1925 with Elisabeth Dounias-Sindermann and composition with Hans Mersmann at the Stern Conservatory. She continued her studies at the music academy in Leipzig and completed her education as a concert pianist in 1930. She then studied musicology in Freiburg i. Br. with Wilibald Gurlitt, and later at the University of Leipzig with Theodor Kroyer. In Leipzig she also studied harpsichord with Günter Ramin and continued in 1931 with Wanda Landowska in Paris.

On 30 January 1933, the day Hitler came to power, she received her PhD from the University of Heidelberg under the supervision of Heinrich Besseler. Her thesis focused on the history of the Italian canzonetta in the 16th century. Because of the anti-Semitic laws introduced by the Nazi party, she could not immediately publish her doctoral thesis, which appeared only five years later. During this time her non-Jewish fiancé and fellow student Fritz Dietrich broke up with her.

=== Flight to Italy and Palestine ===
Kiwi fled to Italy and studied library science and paleography at the University of Bologna, graduating with a diploma in 1934. For some time, she worked as a teacher and librarian at the Liceo Musicale Conte Viatelli. In 1935 she immigrated to Mandatory Palestine. In her first year, she settled in Tel Aviv, where she played as a pianist in a bar for British soldiers. She then moved to Jerusalem and married Kurt Gerson, an engineer who also had emigrated from Germany. The family had a son in 1937 and lived in Rehavia, an upscale suburb of Jerusalem, where many German Jews lived and continued to cultivate a “German” lifestyle.

=== Work as ethnomusicologist ===
From 1936 to 1939 Gerson-Kiwi worked as research assistant with the German-Jewish ethnomusicologist Robert Lachmann (1892–1939) at the Phonographic Archives for Oriental Music. Since then, her research was focused on the religious and non-religious music of the Arab Jews in Israel. Due to the oral character of these kinds of music and the new life of immigrants in Israel, these traditions were getting lost. In 1942, she was appointed as lecturer in music history at the Palestine Conservatory in Jerusalem. After encouragement by the director of the institute, Emil Hauser, she created the phonograph archives of the Palestine Institute of Folklore and Ethnology. During the 1948 Arab-Israeli War , the project was discontinued, but in 1950, the collection was reestablished under the name Archives for Oriental and Jewish Music at the Hebrew University of Jerusalem. Despite economic and administrative difficulties, the archive existed until 1982.

Gerson-Kiwi was particularly active in her ethnomusicological research in the 1950s, when many Jews from Arab countries immigrated to Israel. Using a recording device, she visited numerous camps for immigrants who had come from Iran, Yemen and Morocco, among other countries. In the late 1980s, her collection of some 10.000 recordings was incorporated in the National Sound Archives of the National Library of Israel.

Gerson-Kiwi collected traditional musical instruments and enlarged the instrument collection of the Rubin Academy of Music, later called the Buchman-Mehta School of Music in Jerusalem. In 1965, when the first departments for musicology were created in Israel, she became a senior lecturer at the Hebrew University of Jerusalem and later at Tel Aviv University. In 1969, she was appointed professor and taught there until her retirement in 1976.

Gerson-Kiwi was a co-founder of Israeli musicology. She represented Israel at the International Musicological Society and the International Folk Music Council and was Chair of the Israeli Musicological Society. She published numerous articles in German, Hebrew, English and Italian about the music of Jews from North Africa and the Middle East.

=== Death and legacy ===
Stolperstein in Berlin for Edith Kiwi

Many of her more than 6000 letters, written from 1927 to 1990, bear witness of how attacks and wars weighed heavily on her life and work. “It is indeed a bad fate of ours, always to be after or before a war”, she wrote in a 1970 letter to Grace Spofford, a colleague in New York.

Gerson-Kiwi died on 15 July 1992 in Jerusalem. On 3 October 2026, a Stolperstein brass plate commemorating her flight from Germany was laid in front of her former home in Berlin-Friedrichshain, Stralauer Allee 35.

== Recognition ==
- 1967: Member of the governing board of the International Folk Music Council (IFMC) and the International Musicological Society (IMS)
- 1970: Joel Engel Prize of Tel Aviv municipality for her scientific work on Jewish music
- 1979: Honorary president of the Israel Musicological Society

== Reception ==
After her death, large parts of Gerson-Kiwi’s estate were acquired by the European Center for Jewish Music (EZJM) in Hanover, Germany. The second part of her estate is archived in the National Library of Israel and the Jewish Music Research Centre in Jerusalem, the Felicja Blumental Music Center in Tel Aviv (her collection of musical instruments) as well as Tel Aviv University (documents about her teaching).

In an article in honour of Gerson-Kiwi, the Israeli musicologist Herzl Shmueli commented on her influence on musicology in Israel:

She was the Israeli musicologist who laid the foundations of our present consciousness of the importance and charm of Oriental [non-Western] musical culture, and of the uniqueness and beauty of the songs and music of our Oriental [Jewish] communities.

== Selected publications ==
- Studien zur Geschichte des italienischen Liedmadrigals im XVI. Jahrhundert – Satzlehre und Genealogie der Kanzonetten (PhD thesis. 1933), Würzburg 1938 (in German).
- Jerusalem Archive for Oriental Music. Wege und Ziele des Jerusalemer Archivs für orientalische Musik. Salli Levi, Hermann Swet, World Centre for Jewish Music in Palestine (eds.): Musica Hebraica 1–2, Jerusalem 1938, pp. 40–42; 60.
- The Persian Doctrine of Dastga-Composition. A phenomenological study in the musical modes. Israel Music Institute, Tel Aviv 1963.
- The Music of Kurdistan Jews. A synopsis of their musical styles. Yuval. Studies of the Jewish Music Research Centre 2, Jerusalem 1971, pp. 59–72.
- Robert Lachmann. His Achievement and His Legacy. Yuval. Studies of the Jewish Music Research Centre 3, Jerusalem 1974, pp. 100–108.
- Migrations and Mutations of the Music in East and West: Selected Writings, Tel Aviv 1980.
- A. Z. Idelsohn. A pioneer in Jewish ethnomusicology. Yuval. Studies of the Jewish Music Research Centre 5, The Abraham Idelsohn Memorial Volume, Jerusalem 1986, pp. 46–52.
