= Robert Lachmann =

German ethnomusicologist and orientalist

- Robert Lachmann with his secretary, c. 1936
- Born: 28 November 1892; Berlin, German Reich
- Died: 8 May 1939 (aged 46); Jerusalem, Mandatory Palestine
- Resting place: Mount of Olives Jewish Cemetery
- Education: Berlin University
- Occupations: Ethnomusicologist, Orientalist
- Years active: 1922-1939
- Employer(s): Berlin State Library, Hebrew University of Jerusalem
- Known for: Studies of North African and Middle Eastern music

Robert Lachmann (28 November 1892 – 8 May 1939) was a German ethnomusicologist, Orientalist, polyglot (German, English, French, Arabic), and librarian. He studied and published about the musical traditions of North Africa and the Middle East and was one of the founding members of the Berlin School of Comparative Musicology. After having been forced to leave Germany under the Nazis in 1935 because of his Jewish background, he emigrated to Mandatory Palestine and established an archive of ethnomusicological recordings for the Hebrew University of Jerusalem.

In later appreciation by modern ethnomusicologists, his methods and intentions for researching and publishing both Jewish and Arabic music were seen as “promoting traditional music as a means of understanding the Other.”

== Life and career ==
Robert Lachmann was born to a middle-class German-Jewish family in Berlin. He was one of three sons of Georg Lachmann, a Gymnasium teacher and Johanna, née Händler, who was born in England and had studied at Queen's College, Oxford. He first studied French and English in Berlin and London. Having been assigned as interpreter at a German camp for prisoners of war (POW) during World War I, he became interested in the languages, songs and customs of POWs from North Africa and India and started to learn Arabic, which he later followed up at Berlin university.

Lachmann also studied comparative musicology with Johannes Wolf, Erich von Hornbostel and Curt Sachs and published his Ph.D. dissertation in 1922, based on urban music in Tunisia. Apart from his study Musik des Orients (Music of the Orient), 1929, that compared musical systems of various “Oriental” traditions from North Africa to the Far East, and a translation of a musical treatise by the ninth-century Arab scholar Al-Kindi in 1931, he edited the Zeitschrift für vergleichende Musikwissenschaft (Journal of Comparative Musicology) from 1932-35. For Hornbostel's 1931 edition of Musik des Orients, Lachmann contributed descriptions of Arab classical music.

Robert Lachmann and Kurdish musicians playing a zurna and a dolla (drum) in a recording session

After his earlier field studies, including recordings on wax cylinders with an Edison-phonograph in Tunisia and Morocco, he participated in the 1932 Cairo Congress of Arab Music and was responsible for recording the performances of the musicians invited to the conference. In 1935, Lachmann was dismissed from his position as music librarian at the Berlin State Library, because he was Jewish, and emigrated to Jerusalem.

On the invitation of Judah L. Magnes, chancellor and later president (1935–1948) of The Hebrew University of Jerusalem, Lachmann established a center for Middle Eastern music and the university's archive for "Oriental music". Along with his German sound technician and recording equipment, Lachmann had been able to bring 500 wax cylinder copies from the Berlin phonogramme archive and his personal archives and library. With the assistance of this sound technician, he recorded almost 1000 examples of secular and liturgical music. His sound archive was later incorporated into the National Sound Archives of the National Library of Israel. His work on the music of Arab Jews in Israel was later continued by his research assistant Edith Gerson-Kiwi.

Focusing on sacred and secular musical traditions of different urban and rural “Oriental” communities living in and around Jerusalem, including Bedouin and Palestinian Arabs, Yemenite, Kurdish and Baghdadi Jews, Copts and Samaritans, Lachmann's twelve lectures were illustrated by more than thirty musical examples performed live in the studio by local musicians and singers and simultaneously recorded on metal discs. In two lectures (numbers 10 and 11), based on commercial recordings, he contextualized the live performances with wide-ranging surveys of the urban musical traditions of North Africa and the Middle East, reaching beyond the Arab world to Turkey, Persia, and Hindustan.

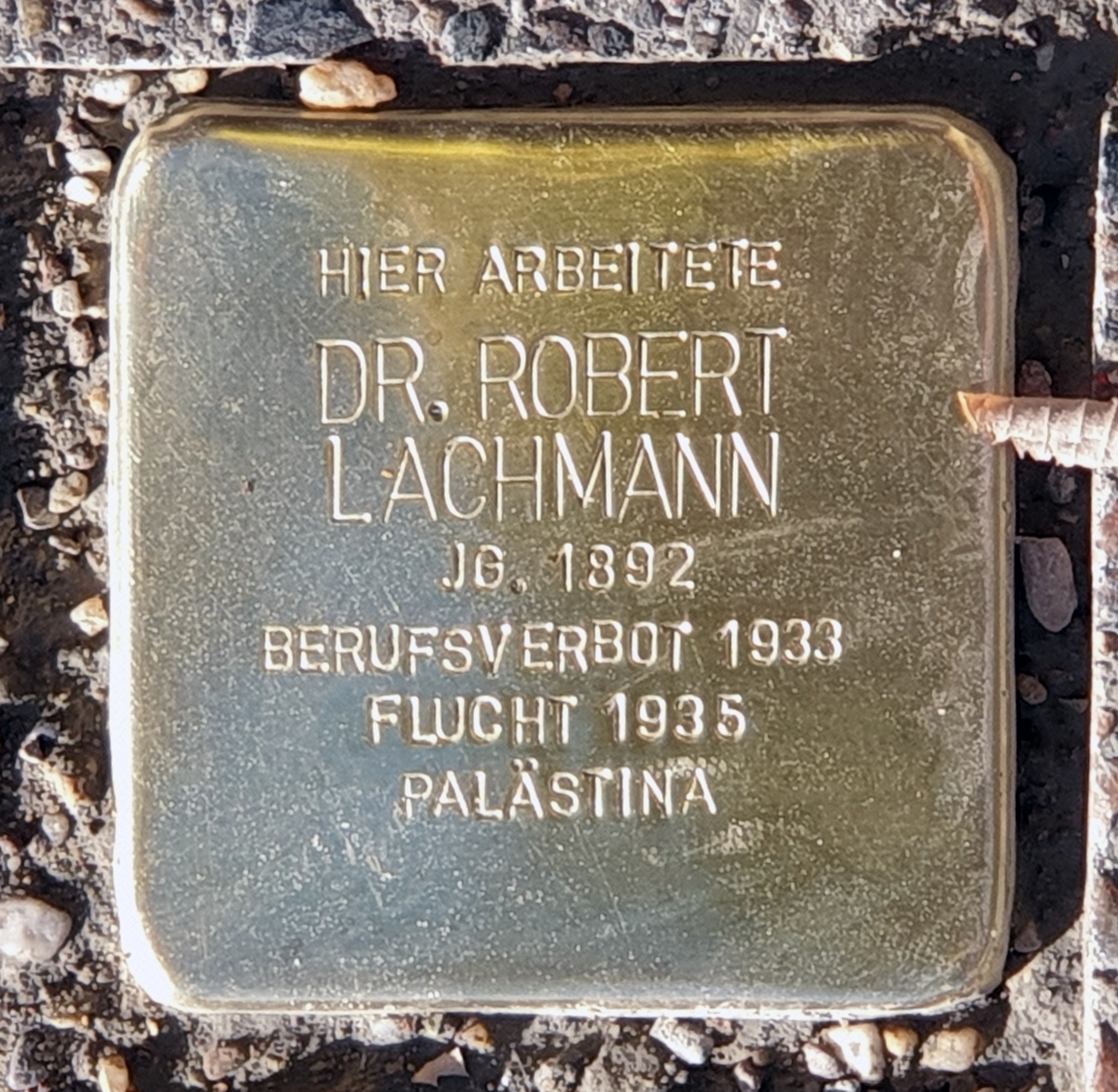
Stolperstein at Unter den Linden 8, Berlin, for Robert Lachmann

Lachmann died four years after his arrival in Jerusalem on 8 Mai 1939 after a long illness at age 46. – On 8 October 2022, his work and forced exile were commemorated by a Stolperstein commemorative plaque in front of the Berlin State Library.

== Publications ==
- Die Musik in den tunisischen Städten (Music in the cities of Tunisia), 1922, (Ph.D. dissertation)
- Musik des Orients (Music of the Orient), Berlin, 1929
- with Mahmoud el-Hefni, eds., Ja'qūb Ibn Isḥāq al-Kindi: Risāla fī Khubr tā'līf al-alhān: Über die Komposition der Melodien, Veröffentlichungen der Gesellschaft zur Erforschung der Musik des Orients, 1, Leipzig: Fr. Kistner and C. F. W. Siegel, 1931.
- Editor of the Zeitschrift für vergleichende Musikwissenschaft (Journal of Comparative Musicology), 1933-35 (Gesellschaft zur Erforschung des Musik des Orients - Society for the Study of Oriental Music) from 1930-1935
- Posthumous Works I: Two Essays: Music in the Popular Life of North Africa. Oriental Music and Antiquity. Jerusalem: Magnes Press, Hebrew University, 1974.
- Posthumous Works II: Jewish Cantillation and Song in the Isle of Djerba. (Archives of Oriental Music), Jerusalem: Magnes Press, Hebrew University, 1978.

== Reception ==
Lachmann's documents, photographs, recordings and other personal belongings are held by the Lachmann Archive (MUS 26), Music Department, Jewish National and University Library, Jerusalem.

For his contributions to the ethnomusicology of North Africa and the Middle East Lachmann has been seen by ethnomusicologists Ruth Katz, Gila Flam and Ruth F. Davis as one of the founders of comparative musicology in Israel. His work is reflected in his lectures and radio programmes of 1936 and 1937 and edited in 2013 by British ethnomusicologist Ruth F. Davis as The Oriental Music Broadcasts, 1936-1937: A Musical Ethnography of Mandatory Palestine.

In her 2010 article "Ethnomusicology and Political Ideology in Mandatory Palestine: Robert Lachmann’s “Oriental Music” Projects", Davis quoted Lachmann as follows:

In no other country, perhaps, the need for a sound understanding of [Eastern music] and the opportunity of studying it answer each other so well as they do in Palestine. For the European, here, it is of vital interest to know the mind of his Oriental neighbour; well, music and singing, as being the most spontaneous outcome of it, will be his surest guide provided he listens to it with sympathy instead of disdain.

— Robert Lachmann (Palestine Broadcasting Station, 18 November, 1936)

Musica Judaica Online Reviews noted Lachmann's broad collection of musical traditions that "provides an important glimpse into the cultural and religious diversity of 1930s Palestine". Ruth Davis characterized Lachmann's work as marred by numerous "obstacles relating to inadequate and insecure finances and a lack of institutional support." Further, she noted "His insistence on recording all the religious groups, without prioritizing any one of them, drew criticisms from both Muslim and Jewish quarters and alienated potential sponsors." Using the methods of what later would be called ethnomusicology, Lachmann's intention was seen as “promoting traditional music as a means of understanding the Other” and as "extraordinarily rich in their contextualization of each lecture’s musical, ethnomusicological, and historical substance."

In The World of Music, Davis's annotations for Lachmann's lectures have been called "a fascinating biographical sketch of one of the field’s most prominent comparative musicologists." Apart from her descriptions of Lachmann's project, she has been credited with acknowledging "the humanity of Lachmann’s professional and personal relationships." The same review about Lachmann's work noted that this was a time when "many Jewish scholars migrated from Europe to Palestine and conflict between Palestine’s Arab and Jewish population was growing." This often lead to criticism of his "outspoken promotion of inclusiveness."

In her 2003 book The Lachmann Problem. An unsung chapter in comparative musicology Israeli musicologist Ruth Katz published her views on Lachmann's life and career. Based on partially unpublished documents and letters by Lachmann and others, she described his career in Palestine as an "institutional failure", because the Hebrew University was not able to offer him an academic position. For his scientific colleagues both in Israel, Germany and the US, however, he was "never a professional failure", a contradiction that Katz saw as "his personal tragedy."

The 2015 film A Magical Substance Flows Into Me by US-Israeli artist Jumana Manna was inspired by Lachmann's broadcasts and presented in 2022 at the Museum of Modern Art in a two-week screening.
