= Book of Velocities =

Studio album by Jon Balke
- Released: 2007
- Recorded: September 2006
- Studios: Radio Studio DRZ; Zürich, Switzerland
- Genre: Jazz
- Length: 67:17
- Labels: ECM; ECM 2010
- Producer: Manfred Eicher

Jon Balke chronology
Diverted Travels (2004)	Book of Velocities (2007)	Siwan (2009)

Book of Velocities is a solo album by pianist Jon Balke recorded in September 2006 and released on ECM the following year.

== Reception ==
The AllMusic review by Thom Jurek states, "Nothing could have prepared the listener for this gorgeous set of unedited, unprocessed, and undubbed piano pieces.... It is very minimal, but also very malleable; change is the order of the proceeding, so a quiet form of delight is given to the listener as the process of discovery unfolds over and over again. Highly recommended."

Professional ratings
Review scores
Source	Rating
AllMusic	3.5/5 stars

== Track listing ==
All tracks are written by Jon Balke.

No.	Title	Length
1.	"Chapter 1: Giada"	3:34
2.	"Chapter 1: Scintilla"	0:56
3.	"Chapter 1: Spread"	4:26
4.	"Chapter 1: Castello"	3:48
5.	"Chapter 1: Resilience"	3:34
6.	"Chapter 2: Single Line"	2:34
7.	"Chapter 2: Nyl"	3:35
8.	"Chapter 2: Double Line"	3:09
9.	"Chapter 3: Obsidian"	3:26
10.	"Chapter 3: Sunday Shapes"	3:19
11.	"Chapter 3: Gum Bounce"	2:00
12.	"Chapter 3: Finger Bass"	3:23
13.	"Chapter 3: Contrivance"	2:45
14.	"Chapter 4: Drape Hanger"	3:15
15.	"Chapter 4: Septima Llegada"	2:03
16.	"Chapter 4: Reel Set"	1:25
17.	"Chapter 4: Scrim Stand"	3:17
18.	"Epilogue: Sonance"	4:46
19.	"Epilogue: Nefriit"	2:58

== Personnel ==
- Jon Balke – piano
