= Maghreb rebab =

Maghreb rebáb
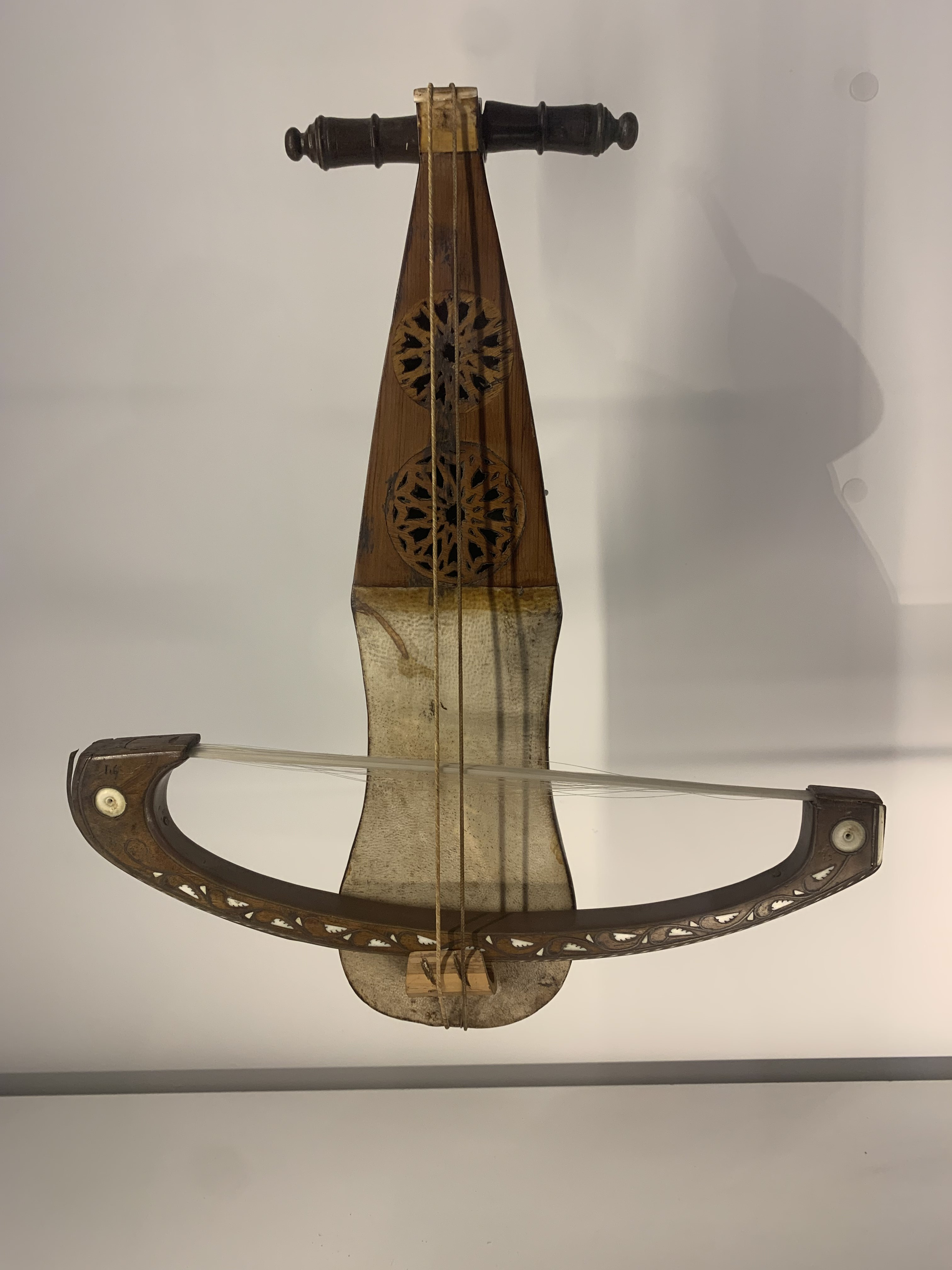
- Rebab, Meknes, Morocco
- Other names: Maghribi rabāb, Moorish rebab, rebab, rebeb, rbeb, rbab
- Classification: bowed string instrument
- Hornbostel–Sachs classification: 321.71 (Instruments in which sound is produced by one or more vibrating strings, in which the resonator and string bearer are physically united and can not be separated without destroying the instrument, in which the strings run in a plane parallel to the sound table, in which the strings are sounded using a bow)
- Developed: Developed in Andalusian Spain/North Africa, likely applying a bow to a plucked lute with a skin soundboard, such as a rubab or gambus or an earlier oud or barbat

Related instruments
- rebec; Byzantine lyra; gadulka; gambus; gudok; Pontian lyra; lijerica; Calabrian lira; Cretan lyra; rabel

The Maghreb rebab or Maghrebi rebab is a bowed lute now played mainly in Northern Africa. It fits within the wider rebab traditions of the Arab world, but also branched into European musical tradition in Spain, Sicily, and the Holy Roman Empire. In the late Middle Ages, the European rebec developed from this instrument (and from the related Byzantine lyra). The Maghreb rebab was described by a musicologist as the "predominant" rebab of North Africa, although the instrument was in decline with younger generations when that was published in 1984.

The name rebáb (rabáb, rabába, rubáb, Arabic ربابة) refers to a group of significantly different stringed instruments, plucked or bowed lutes in regions under the influence of Islam. In North-West Africa and Al-Andalus in the Iberian Peninsula, a short-necked lute played with a bow was developed. It survives today as part of Andalusi classical music.

== Muslim and Europeans interact ==
Plucked and bowed

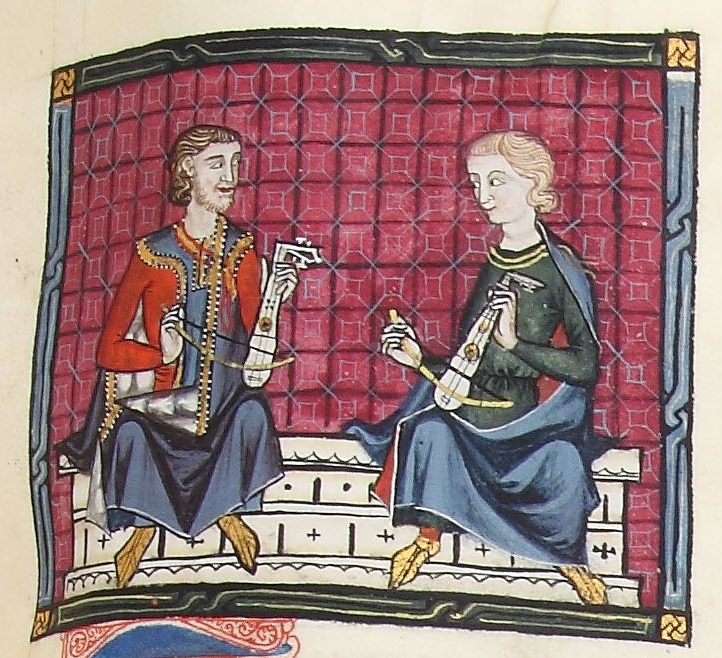
Two musicians playing the "rabé morisco" from the Cantigas de Santa María of Alfonso X of Castile, 13th century.

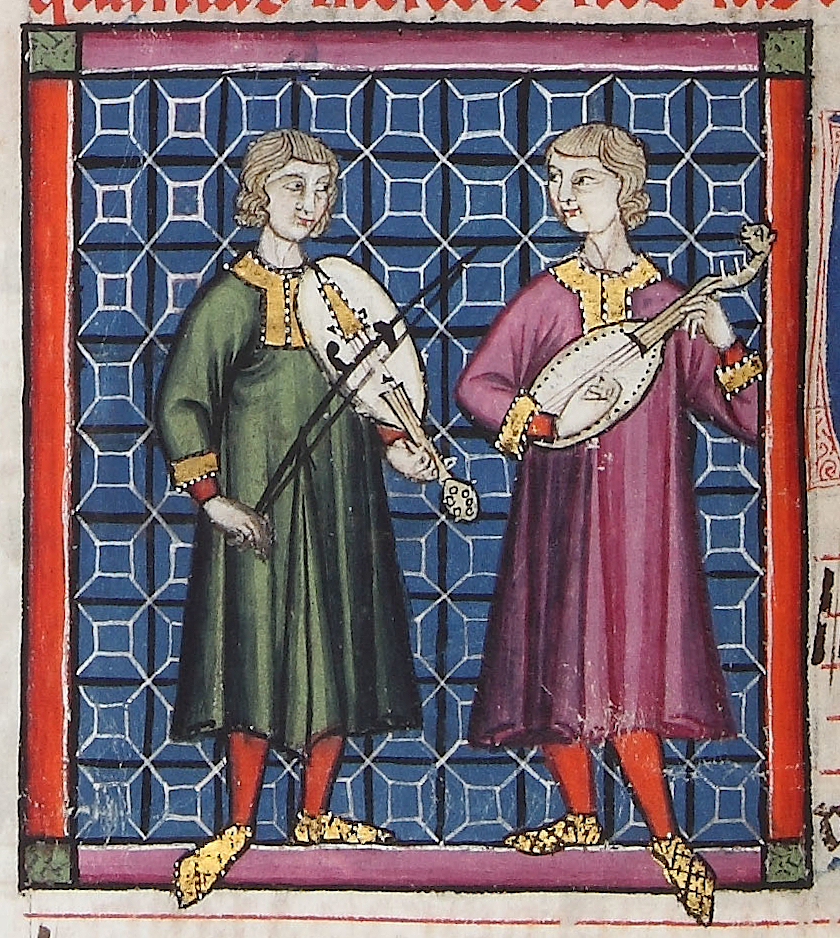
Musicians playing the vihuela (or vielle), one with a bow, the other plucked by hand.

Instruments from Spain; instruments that followed shared similar names (coming from different languages) vihuela, viola and vielle.

The Umayyads conquered Hispania in 711 and created Andalusia. During the 8th and 9th centuries, many musicians and artists from across the Islamic world flocked to Iberia. By the 11th century, Muslim sections of Spain, or Al-Andalus, had become a center for the manufacture of instruments. These goods spread gradually to Provence, influencing French troubadours and trouvères and eventually reaching the rest of Europe. While Europe developed the lute, the oud remained a central part of Arab music, and broader Ottoman music as well, undergoing a range of transformations.

Beside the introduction of the lute to Spain by the Moors, another important point of transfer of lutes and rebabs from Arabian to European culture was Sicily, where it was brought either by Byzantine or later by Muslim musicians. There were singer-lutenists at the court in Palermo following the Norman conquest of the island from the Muslims, and the lute is depicted extensively in the ceiling paintings in the Palermo's royal Cappella Palatina, dedicated by the Norman King Roger II of Sicily in 1140. Sicilian influence increased as Tuscan poets visited Sicily in the 13th century to partake of the local culture. His Hohenstaufen grandson Frederick II, Holy Roman Emperor (1194–1250) continued integrating Muslims into his court, including Moorish musicians. By the 14th century, lutes had disseminated throughout Italy and, probably because of the cultural influence of the Hohenstaufen kings and emperor, based in Palermo, the lute had also made significant inroads into the German-speaking lands.

When Muslims were driven out of Spain, they took refuge in countries across the Mediterranean Sea, in Africa. Of those permanently expelled, the majority eventually settled in the Barbary Coast (Maghreb), and others to France, Sicily, Italy and Constantinople. The Maghreb rebab was preserved in the Maghreb, even as Europeans continued to develop their fiddles into the rebec and viel (which in turn became the viol and vihuela).

== Description ==
The Northwest African rebab consists of two joined parts: the elongated, boat-shaped instrument (Morocco) or pear-shaped instrument (Algeria and Tunisia), and the bent-back tuning head. The body up to the peghead is hollow; the carved body is 48–60 cm long, 9–12 cm wide, 8 cm deep, and is made of walnut or cedar wood. It is divided into two parts, with the skin soundboard covering the lower part, the instrument gradually narrowing into a hollow neck in which there are sound holes and to which the peghead is finally connected. The part covered with leather is curved on both sides to facilitate bowing. The other part, towards the head, is covered with a thin red copper plate pierced by round rosettes and which is bordered by a decorative border. Similar to the old Arab lutes, its head is 12 cm long, bent back almost at a right angle, and has two large, side-positioned tuning keys. There is a bony saddle at the junction of the body and head.

the instrument has two gut strings, which start from the bottom of the instrument and pass through a tailpiece (made of a piece of reed split in half) and extend towards the bridge. The strings run above the copper plate covering the upper part of the body at such a height that they cannot be pushed down against the neck in the manner of a violin: the instrument does not have a fretboard. Instead the musician uses their fingernails to stop the strings at different notes. The two strings are tuned to a fifth interval, e.g. G–d or d–a. The bow is small, curved, and made of metal, with horse hair stretched between the ends.

The instrument's voice, rich in overharmonics, is used to underline vocals in an instrumental ensemble. While playing, the head of the instrument is at the musician's left shoulder, the lower part rests on the right knee, or it stands vertically between the musician's legs. The left hand is almost always in the default position, it rarely changes position. As usual for oriental stringed instruments, the string held in the hand with the palm turned outward plays on the higher string, occasionally touching the lower one. Nowadays, the instrument is used only by the older generation.

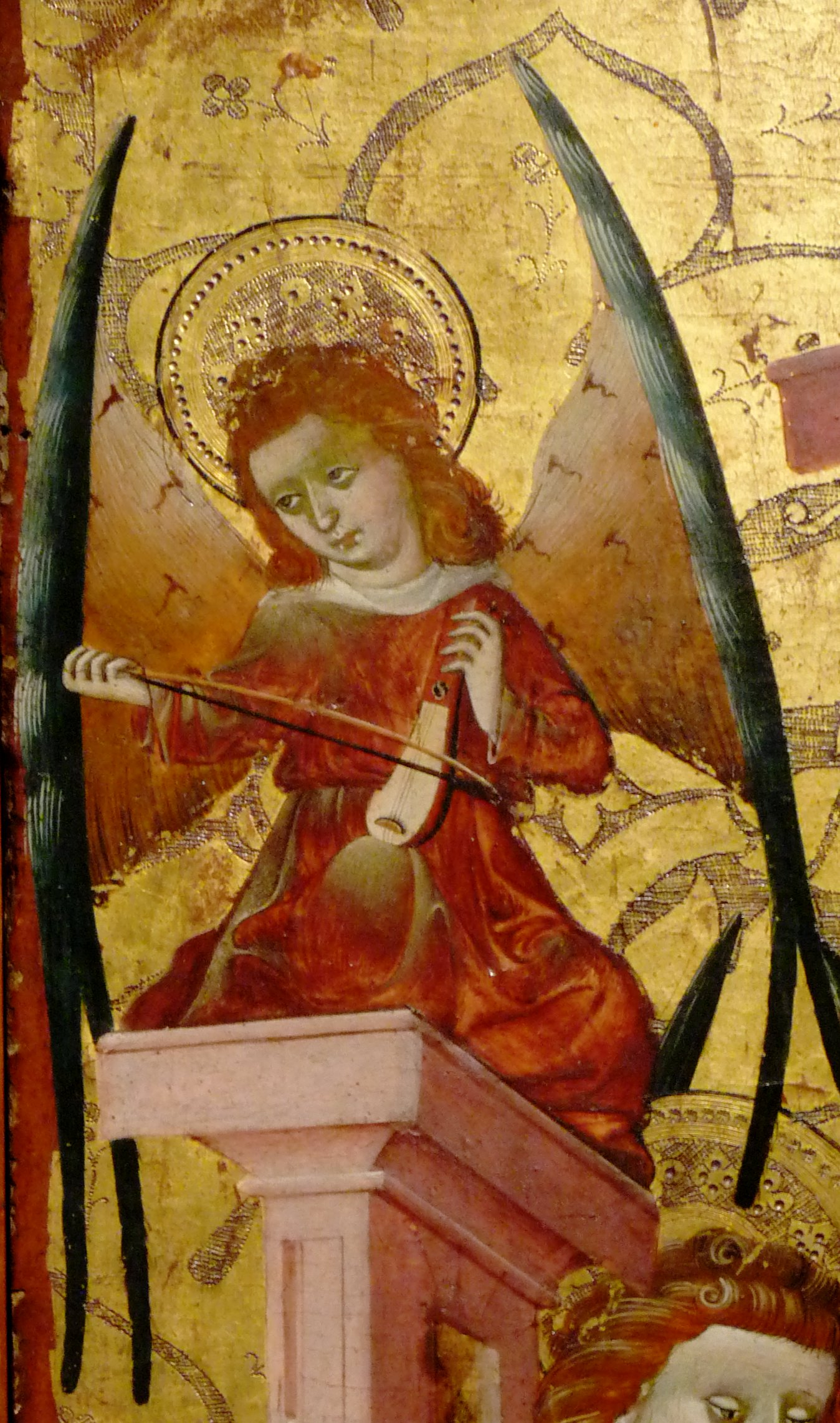
Panel of the Altarpiece of Santa María la Mayor de Albalate del Arzobispo, now in the Museum of Zaragoza.

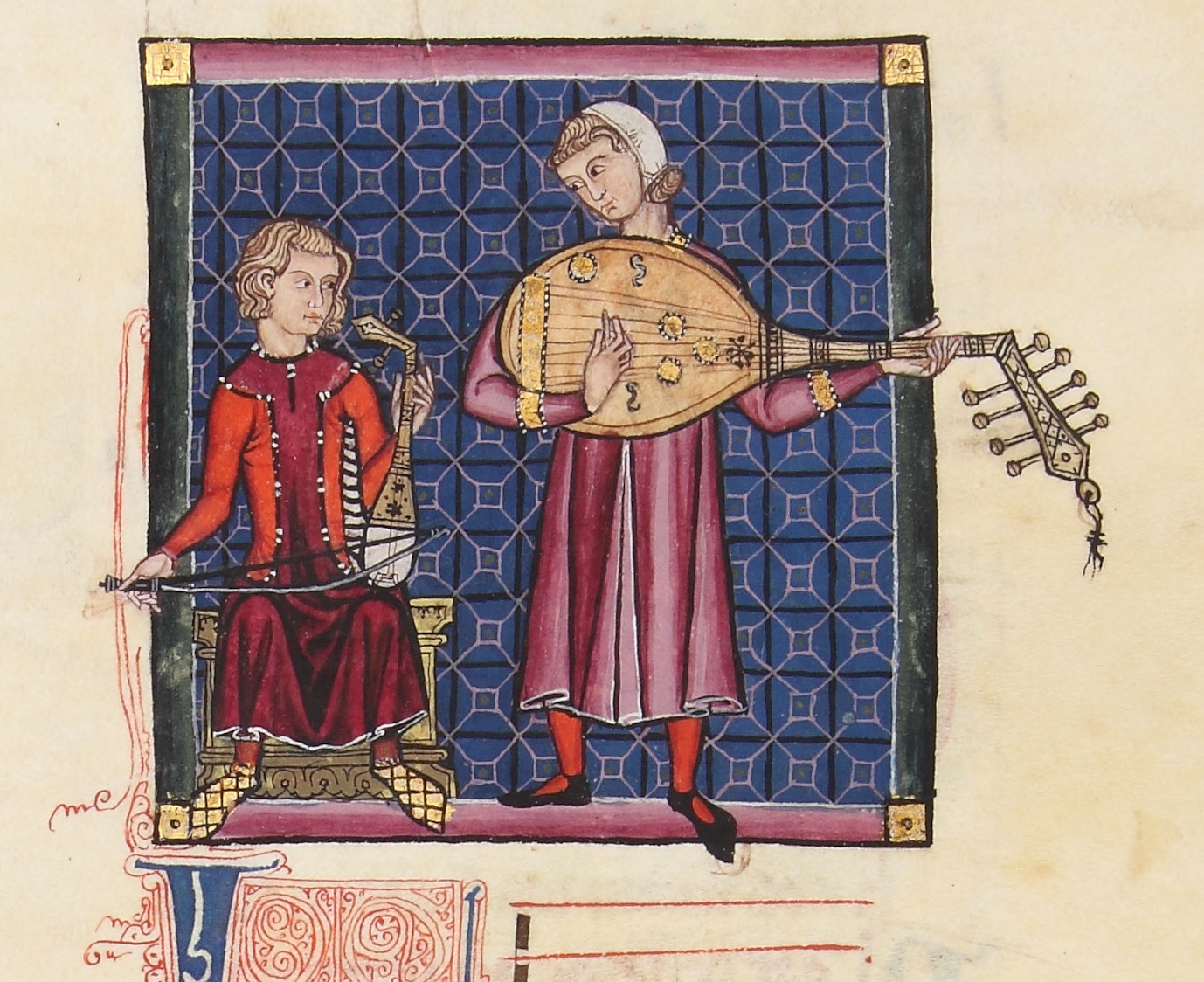
Rebáb with oriental short-necked lute from the Cantigas de Santa María manuscript, Codex of the musicians.

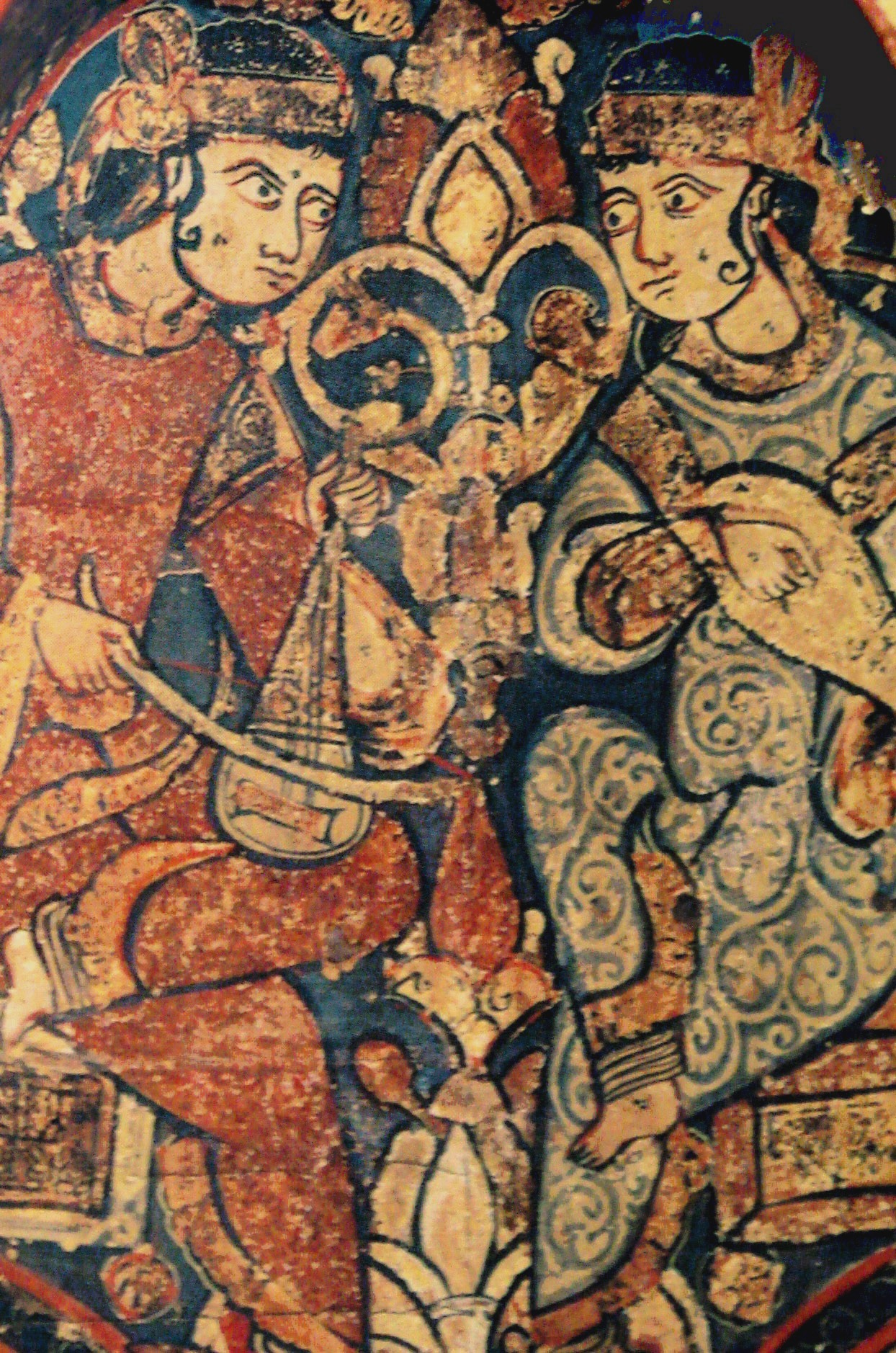
Muslim musicians, ceiling of the Palatine chapel (Palermo, Sicily). Muslim musicians played in the court of Roger II of Sicily.

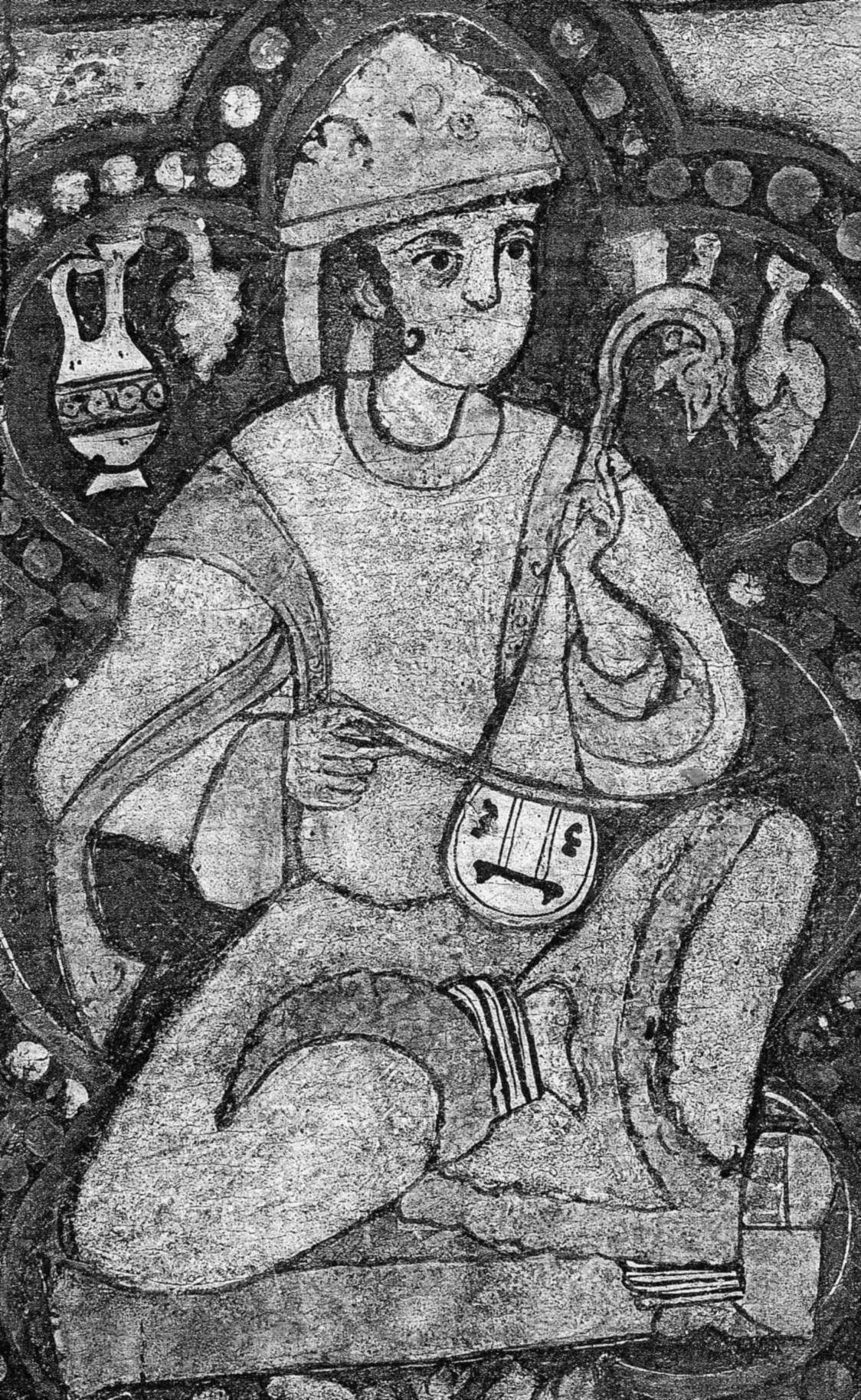
Woman playing a rebab, Palatine chapel (Palermo, Sicily).

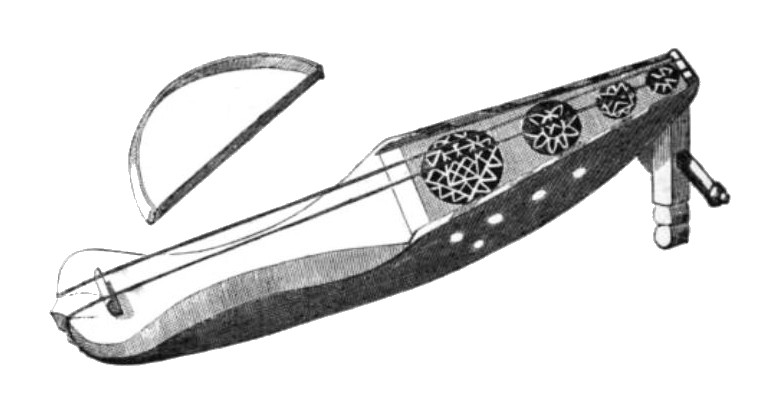
Boat-shaped rebab, 19th century.

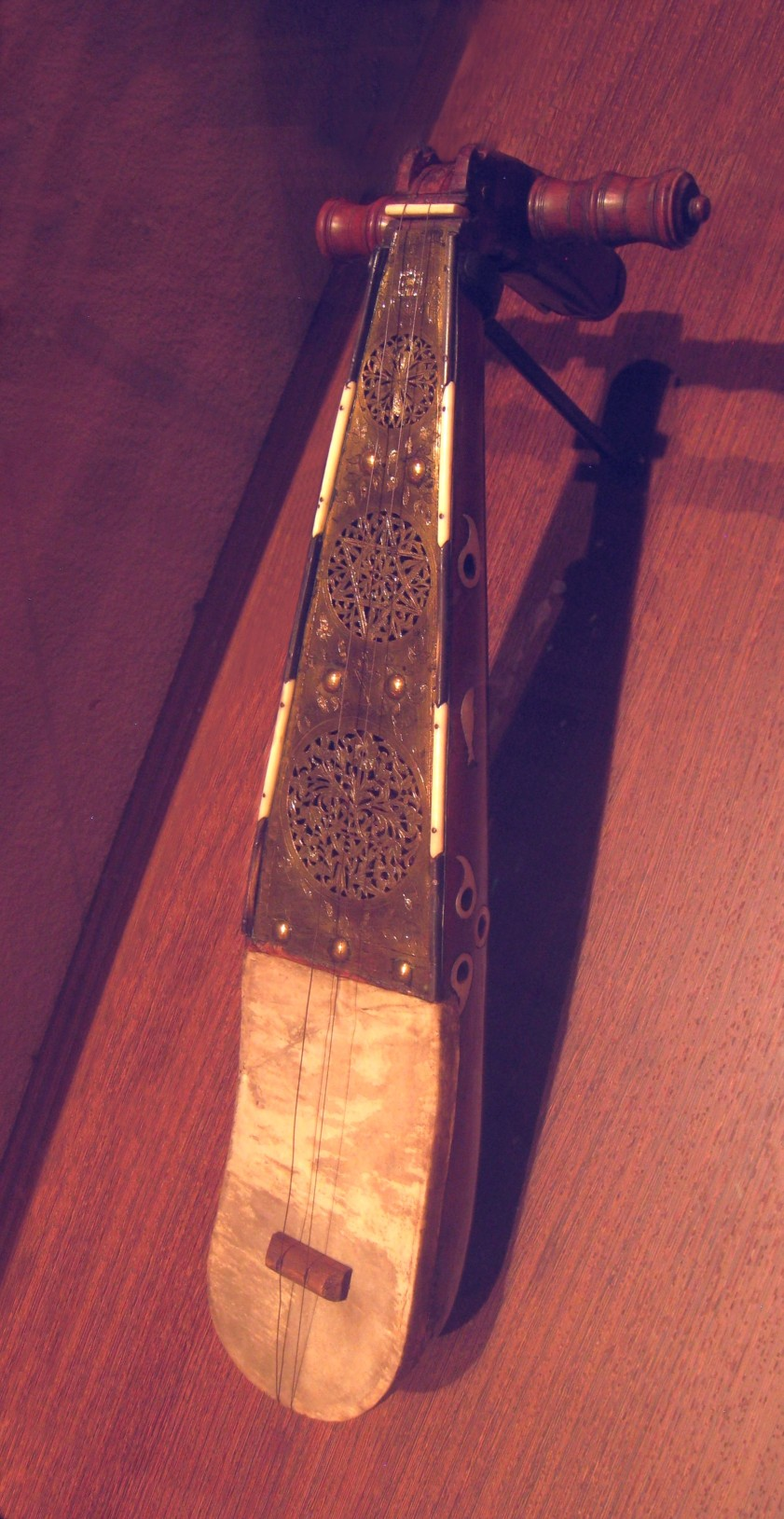
Rebáb in the musical instrument museum in Brussels.

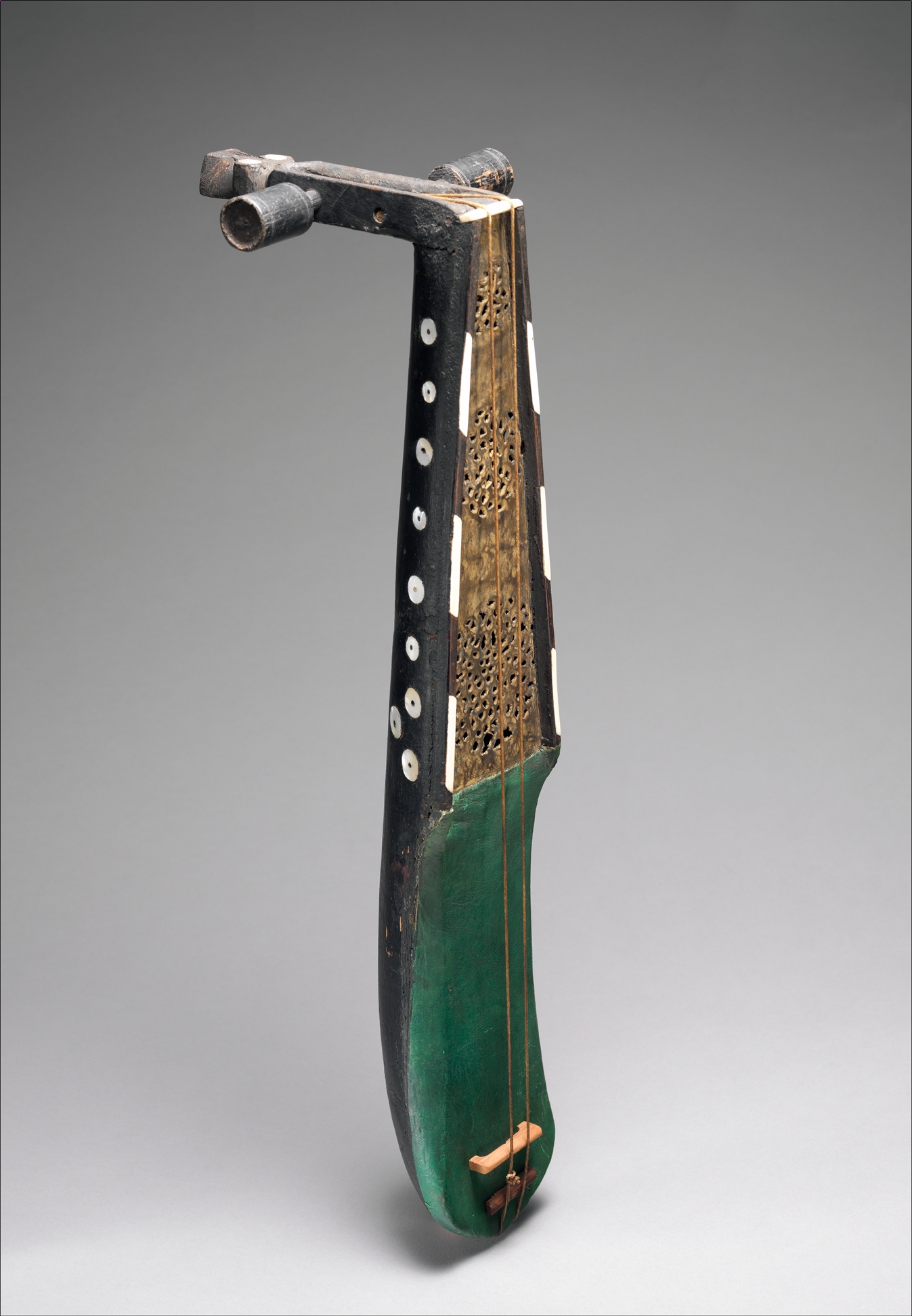
Rebab late 19th century, Algerian or Moroccan, in the collections of the Metropolitan Museum of Art

== Reference books ==
- Brockhaus Riemann music lexicon III. (ROE). Ed. Carl Dahlhaus, Hans Heinrich Eggebrecht. Budapest: Music Publishing House. 1985. ISBN 9633305723
- Fetis, François-Joseph. Histoire générale de la musique . Librairie de Firmin Didot Frères, Fils et C ie (1869)
