= Avraham Eilam-Amzallag =

Israeli musician and composer

Avraham Eilam-Amzallag אברהם (אבי) אמזלג עילם
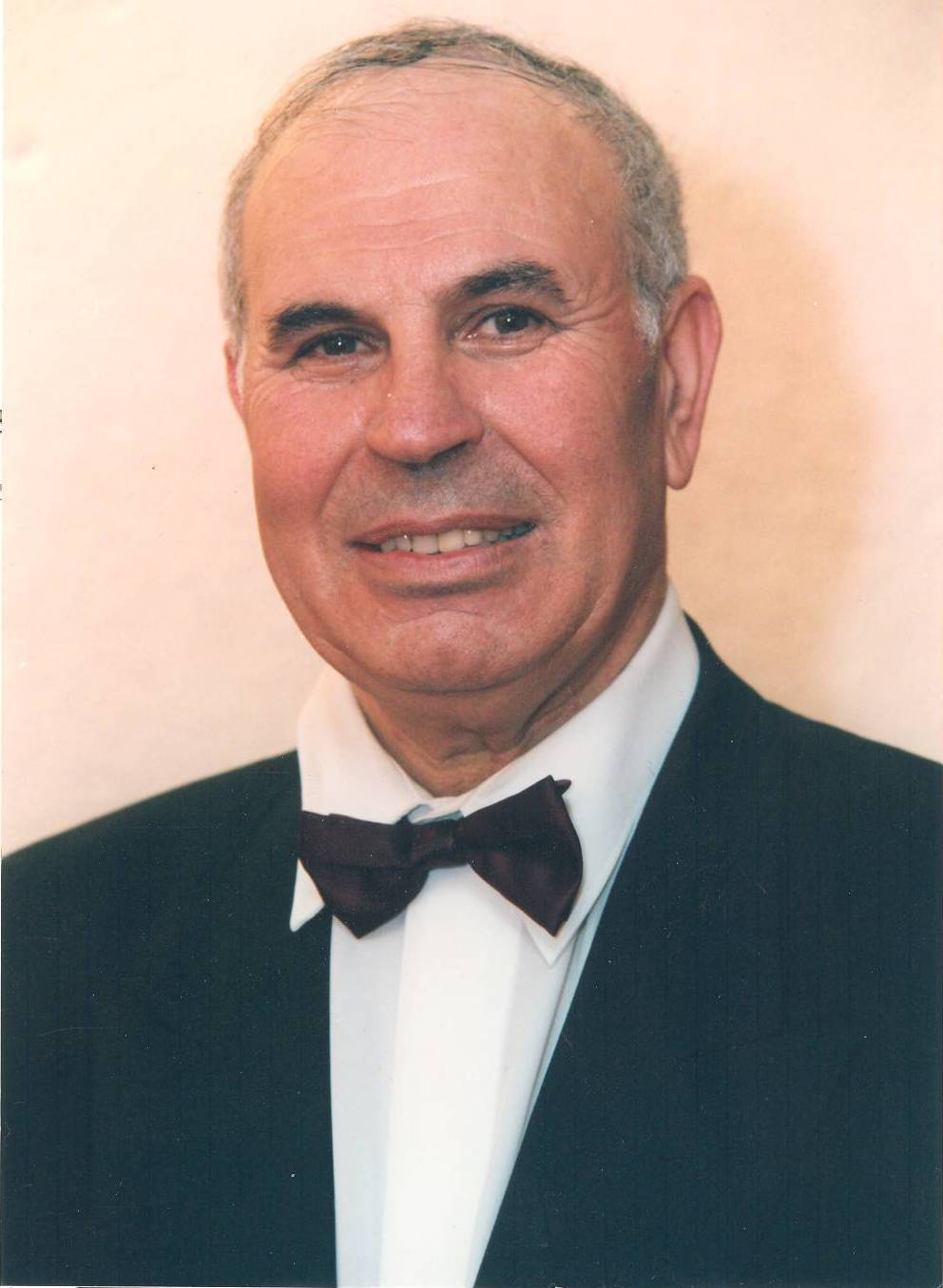
- Avraham Eilam-Amzallag

Background information
- Born: September 28, 1941 (age 84); Casablanca, Morocco
- Origin: Israel
- Genres: Oriental music; Contemporary music
- Occupations: Musician; Composer
- Instrument: Flute

Avraham Eilam-Amzallag (Hebrew: אברהם (אבי) אמזלג עילם; born 28 September 1941) is an Israeli musician and composer.

== Biography ==
Avraham (Avi) Eilam-Amzallag was born in Casablanca, Morocco. He immigrated to Israel as a child. He first studied the flute and later compositional studies at the Buchman-Mehta Music Academy in Tel Aviv.

== Music career ==
He is the founder of an ensemble that performs oriental music. His compositions are described as a fusion of oriental Jewish music with contemporary technique.

== Selected compositions ==
- Desolation [3:33 minutes]
- (composition for flute) (Mawal) [5:13 minutes]
- Music for flute and percussion (1975)
- Composition

== Published works ==
- Music for flute and percussion (1975).

== See also ==
- Music of Israel
