= Sanaa (music) =

Traditional Arab-Andalusian music of Algiers

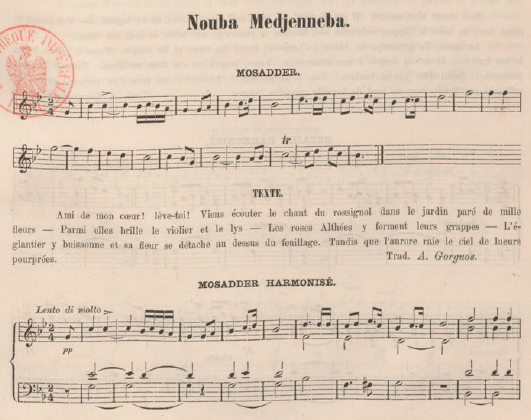
- A Mseddar piece from the Nûba Mǧənba : Qum yā ḥabībī, by Alexandre Christianowitsch, 1863.
- Native name: الصّنعة ə-Ṣan'a
- Etymology: Arabic for "embellished" or "craft(ed)"
- Other names: School of Algiers
- Stylistic origins: Algiers (Algeria) Cordoba (Al-Andalus)
- Typical instruments: Rabāb; kwitra (Algerian 'ud); târ; kemandja; snîtra; qanun; f'hal
- Derivative forms: Chaabi; 'Aroubi; Hawzi; Rehâwi

Subgenres
- Nuba; Inqilab; Qadriyya

Other topics
- The school of Tlemcen (san'a, gharnâta/i), the school of Constantine

The sanâa or sanâa of Algiers (arabic: الصّنعة, ə-Ṣan'a) or simply the Andalusian, refers to the Arab-Andalusian classical music of the school of Algiers, whose tradition relates to the city of Cordoba in medieval Al-Andalus.

== Origin and meaning ==
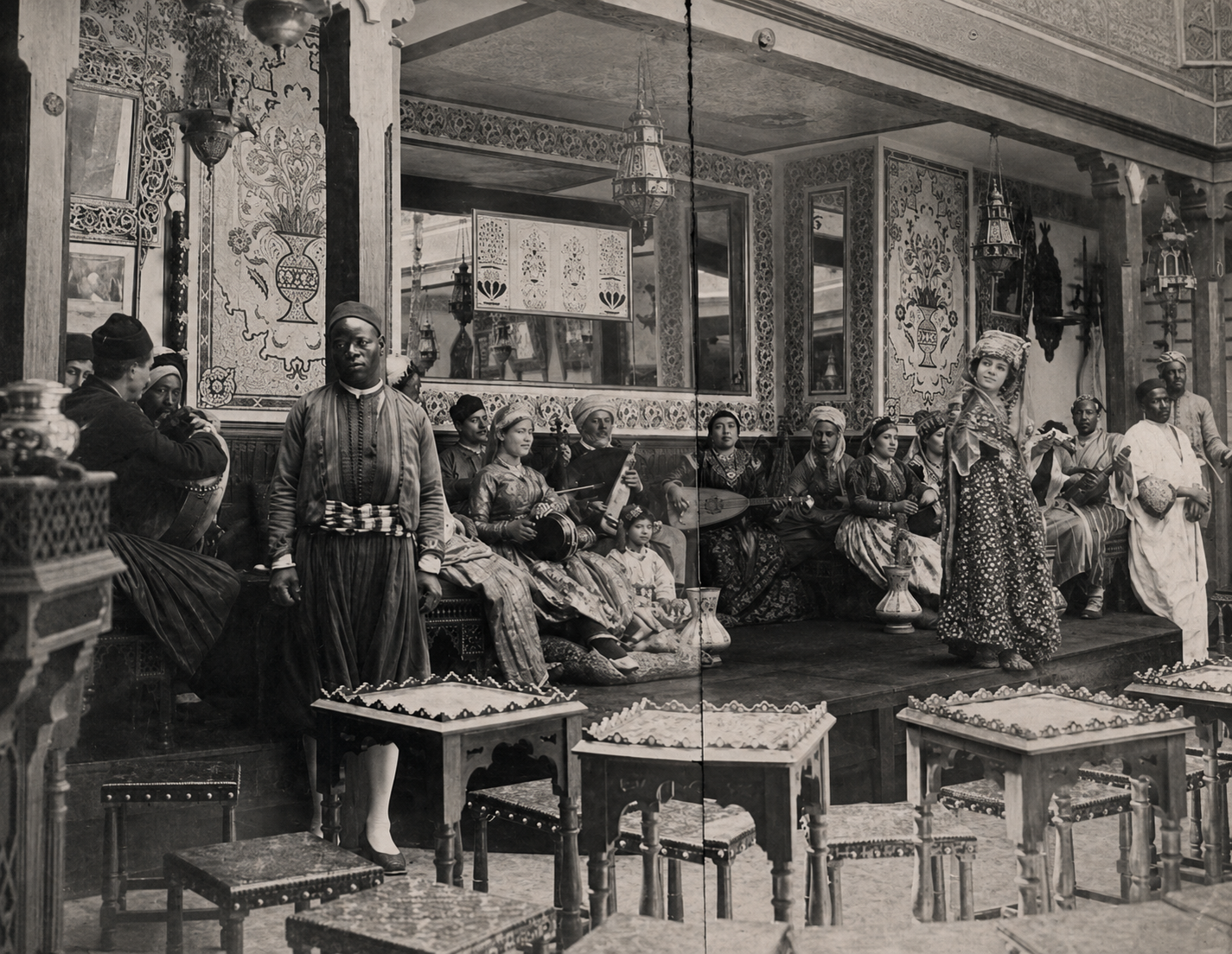
Andalusi music group in the Algerian pavilon at the 1889 World Exhibition in Paris

Sanâa or san'a means "musical mastery", "embellished" or "craft(ed)". This is the specific name attributed in Algeria to the Andalusi nubah of Algiers, distinguished from the Gharnati of Tlemcen and the Maluf of Constantine.

However, the sanâa of Algiers shares many similarities with the Gharnati of Tlemcen. The schism between them occurred in 1946, with the creation of the Arab-Andalusian classical orchestra of Radio d'Alger.

== Features ==
=== Modes ===
A vocal and instrumental Istiḥbār in the tab' al-Ǧārkā, by Mahieddine BACHTARZI (1929).

The sanaa musical system is a modal system, based on sixteen modes (الطبع: Ṭabʿ, الطبوع: pl. tūbūb') which are divided into two main groups : principal modes, defined on the basis of seven istiḥbār (vocal and instrumental semi-improvisations), and derived modes.

1. Istiḥbār Mawwāl :
    - Mawwāl (الموال)
      - Dīl (الذيل)
      - Raṣd ə-Dīl (رصد الذيل)
      - Māya (الماية)
2. Istiḥbār Zīdān :
    - Zīdān (الزيدان)
      - Raml (الرمل)
      - Mǧənba (المجنبة)
3. Istiḥbār Raml əl-Māya :
    - Raml əl-Māya (رمل الماية)
      - Raṣd (الرصد)
4. Istiḥbār al-'Iraq :
    - 'Iraq (العراق)
      - Ḥsīn (الحسين)
      - Ġrīb (الغريب)
      - Ġrībat əl-Ḥsīn (غريبة الحسين)
5. Istiḥbār Ǧārkā :
    - Ǧārkā (الجاركاه)
6. Istiḥbār Sīkā :
    - Sīkā (السيكاه)
7. Istiḥbār Məzmūm :
    - Məzmūm (المزموم)

The French musicologist, Jule Rouanet, added other modes considered as lost :

- Asbaʿayn (الاصبعين)
- Ḥsīn Aṣīl (الحسين الاصيل)
- Ḥsīn Ṣabā (الحسين صبا)
- Ḥsīn ʿUšəyrān (الحسين عشيران)
- Iṣbahān Kabīr (الاصبهان الكبير)
- Iṣbahān Ṣaġir (الاصبهان الصغير)
- Rahāwi (الرهاوي)
- Raml əl-ʿAšiyya (رمل العشية)
- Māya Fāriġ (الماية الفارغ)
- ʿUššāq (العشّاق)

=== Rhythmic system ===
The rhythmic system of the sanaa takes into account percussion, melody and prosody rhythms, which distinguishes it from the Andalusian muwashshah whose rhythm is based exclusively on the music.

The rhythm of the percussion is relatively simple:

- Mizân al-Bašraf (DTT): a three-beat rhythm 4/4 or 2/2, used for the three first phases of the nuba (Mṣeddar, Bṭāyḥī and Derǧ) and for their kûrsi.
- Mizân al-Inṣirāf (DTD TTT): a two units of three beats rhythm 6/8, used for the fourth phase (Inṣirāf), tūšiyyet al-inṣirāfāt and for qadriyyət ə-ṣan'a.
- Mizân al-H̱alās (D–D–TT) 6/8: derived from mizân al-Inṣirāf by substituting silences for two beats of the inṣirāf rhythm. It is used for the fifth phase (H̱alās).
- Mîzān a-Sufyān 7/4: known as mîzān əl-Inqilābāt in Algiers.

== Genres ==
=== The nuba ===
The oldest elements of the Andalusian repertoire are organized into large suites (nûba (arabic: النوبة), pl. nubât (arabic: النوبات)) consisting of different vocal and instrumental mouvement of different tempi and percussive cycles. Furthermore, each nuba possesses a large set of pieces that are never played entirely.

The Algerian nuba repertoire is modular, each one is based on one main musical mode (tab') which gives it its name. We identify twelve complete nubas and four which are incomplete.

An Inqilāb in the tab' al-Ǧārkā "sallī humūmak fī da-l-ʿašīyyā", by El Motribia ensemble (1929).

== See also ==
- Andalusian classical music
- Gharnati music
