= Gharnati music =

Algerian subgenre of Arab-Andalusian music

Gharnati
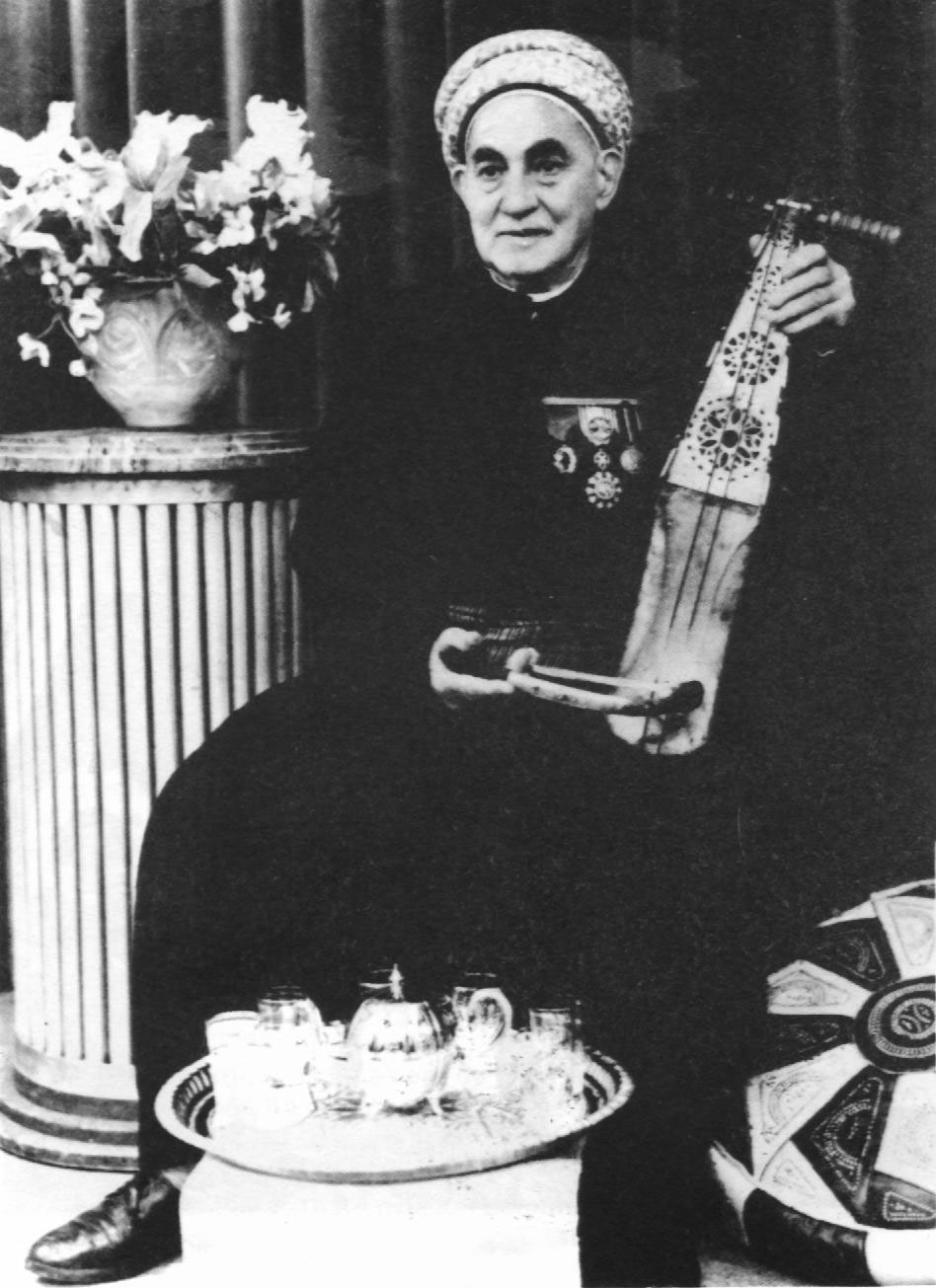
- Hadj Larbi Bensari, an emblematic figure of the school of Tlemcen (Ghernati) of the 20th century
- Other names: San'a of Tlemcen; School of Tlemcen; Gharnata
- Stylistic origins: Granada (Emirate of Granada), Tlemcen (Algeria)
- Typical instruments: Rebab; kwitra (Algerian 'ud); kemandja; mandoline; qanun; f'hal

Subgenres
- Nuba; Inqilab; Qadriyya; Hawzi; 'Aroubi; Madih (panegyric)

Other topics
- The school of Algiers (sanaa), The school of Constantine (malouf)

Mṣeddar raṣd ə-Dīl "rani bi-l-afrah" sung by Lazaar BEN DALI YAHIA.

Gharnati (Arabic: الغرناطي), also known as sana', is an Algerian variety of Andalusian classical music originating in Tlemcen. Its name is derived from the Arabic name of the city of Granada. Gharnati has also become an established tradition in other cities in western Algeria, such as Oran, Nedroma and Sidi-Bel-Abbès. In the 20th century it also spread to Morocco after being brought over by Algerian families who moved there fleeing French colonial rule in Algeria, and eventually founding conservatories in cities like Oujda and Rabat.

== Features ==
=== Modes ===
The modes (Arabic: طبوع: tūbūb') that are known in the school of Tlemcen are the following:

- Mawwāl (الموال)
  - Mawwāl (الموال)
  - Dīl (الذيل)
  - Raṣd ə-Dīl (رصد الذيل)
  - Māya (الماية)
- Zīdān (الزيدان)
  - Zīdān (الزيدان)
  - Raml əl-ʿAšiyya (رمل العشية)
  - Mǧənba (المجنبة)
- Raml əl-Māya (رمل الماية)
  - Raml əl-Māya (رمل الماية)
  - Raṣd (الرصد)
- 'Iraq Maṭlūq (العراق المطلوق)
  - 'Iraq Maṭlūq (العراق المطلوق)
  - Ḥsīn (الحسين)
  - Ġrībat əl-Ḥsīn (غريبة الحسين)
- Məzmūm (المزموم)
  - Məzmūm (المزموم)
- Sīkā (السيكاه)
  - Sīkā (السيكاه)
- Ǧārkā (الجاركاه)
  - Ǧārkā (الجاركاه)
- ‘Irāq Maḥṣūr (العراق المحصور)
  - ‘Irāq Maḥṣūr (العراق المحصور)
  - Ġrīb (الغريب)

=== The nuba ===
In Tlemcen, a nuba is a musical composition consisting of an ordered suite of vocal and instrumental pieces built around five movements whose rhythm progresses from very slow to very light and which are divided into two theoretical parts, the first comprising the first three movements (mṣeddar, bṭāyḥī and derǧ) and the second, the last two (inṣirāf and meẖles).

The structure of a typical nuba:

1. Mšālyā: an unmeasured instrumental prelude that introduces and develops the main mode and neighboring modes used in its development. It also introduces the audience into its mood and plays the role of a rhythmic introduction to the tūšiyya.
2. Tūšiyya: instrumental ouverture composed of several patterns (each repeated once) in which follow a series of rhythmic signatures recalling the five movements that form the nuba.
  - Rhythmic cycle (mîzān): ( = 110)
    - Mîzān əl-bašraf ǧwāb "instrumental" (4/4)
    - Mîzān əl-inqilāb (2/8)
    - Mîzān əl-qṣîd ǧwāb "instrumental" (8/8)
    - Mîzān əl-inṣirāf / əl-meẖles (6/8)
3. Mšālyā: (see above)
4. Kūrsi al-mṣeddar: a melodic and rhythmic pattern that introduces the first movement.
  - Rhythmic cycle (mîzān):
    - Mîzān əl-qṣîd ǧwāb "instrumental" (8/8)
5. Kūrsi al-mṣedrayn: a melodic and rhythmic pattern that separates two mṣeddar-s.
6. Mṣeddar (first movement): vocal and instrumental piece (one or more).
  - Rhythmic cycle (mîzān):
    - Singing: mîzān əl-qṣîd qūl (16/8)
    - Instrumental answer: mîzān əl-qṣîd ǧwāb (4/8)
7. Kūrsi al-bṭāyḥī: a melodic and rhythmic pattern that introduces the second movement.
  - Rhythmic cycle (mîzān):
    - Mîzān əl-bašraf ǧwāb "instrumental" (4/4)
8. Bṭāyḥī (second movement): vocal and instrumental piece (one or more).
  - Rhythmic cycle (mîzān):
    - Singing: mîzān əl-bašraf qūl (4/8)
    - Instrumental answer: mîzān əl-bašraf ǧwāb (4/4)
9. Kūrsi əl -derǧ: a melodic and rhythmic pattern that introduces the third movement.
  - Rhythmic cycle (mîzān):
    - Mîzān əl-derǧ (6/4)
10. Derǧ (third movement): vocal and instrumental piece (one or more).
  - Rhythmic cycle (mîzān):
    - Mîzān əl-derǧ (6/4)
11. Istiḥbār: Unmeasured vocal improvisation where the musician displays his inspiration and his virtuosity.
12. Tūšiyyet əl-inṣirāfāt: instrumental interlude introducing the fourth movement (inṣirāf). In its absence, the kūrsi əl-inṣirāf takes its place.
  - Rhythmic cycle (mîzān):
    - Mîzān əl-inṣirāf (6/8)
13. Inṣirāf (fourth movement): vocal and instrumental piece (one or more).
  - Rhythmic cycle (mîzān):
    - Mîzān əl-inṣirāf (6/8)
14. Meẖles (fifth movement): vocal and instrumental piece (one or more).
  - Rhythmic cycle (mîzān):
    - Mîzān əl-meẖles (6/8)
15. Tūšiyyet əl -kamāl: Instrumental piece ending the nuba. It may also serve to introduce another nuba.

=== Nubat əl-inqilābāt ===
It is a suite composed of vocal and instrumental pieces (Muwashshah and zajal) in which different modes and rhythmic cycles follow one another (mîzān əl-qṣîd ǧwāb (8/4), mīzān ə-sofyān (7/4), mîzān əl-bašrāf ǧwāb (4/4) and bašrāf qūl (8/4), mîzān əl-Gūbbāḥī (4/4) and mîzān əl-inṣirāf (6/8)).

=== Slisla ===
Slisla refers to a kind of nubat əl-inqilābāt in which pieces (inqilābāt) evolve in the same rhythmic cycle (mīzān), such as slislet mîzān əl-qṣîd, slislet mīzān ə-ṣofyān, slislet mīzān əl-bašraf or slislet mīzān əl-inṣirāf. Each slisla begins with a mšālyā and a tūšiyya, and ends with a meẖles.

=== Qadriyya ===
It is a small vocal piece composed in a mîzān əl-inṣirāf (6/8) often used to close a classical nuba. Qadriyya-s are found in seven modes including mawwāl, zīdān, ğārkā, raml əl-Māya, ‘Irāq and sīkā.

== Representative artists ==
=== Algeria ===
==== Composers ====
- Mohamed ibn al-Khamis (1252-1369)
- Abou Hammou Moussa II (1324-1388), the eighth sultan of the zayyanid dynasty.
- Ibn al-Banna a-Tilimsani 14th century
- Abi Djamaa Talalisi (1330-?), the doctor-poet of the zayyanid dynasty court.
- Abou Othmane Said El Mendassi (1583-1677)
- Ahmed al-Bekri (17th century)
- Ibn Nachit (17th century)
- Ahmed Ben Triki (1650-1750)
- Abou Abdillah Mohamed Ben Ahmed Ben Msayeb (1688-1768)
- Moulay Ahmed Ben Antar (18th century)
- Mohamed Bendebbah a-Tilimsani (18th century)
- Mohamed Touati (18th century)
- M’barek Bouletbaq (18th century-1768)
- Boumediene Bensahla (18th century-1797)

==== Great masters and famous performers ====
- Abdelkader Kermouni-Serradj (1855-1946)
- Abdelkrim Dali (1914-1978)
- Abderrahmane Sekkal (1910-1985)
- Abdeslam Bensari
- Amine Kalfat (1942)
- Amine Mesli (1955-2006)
- Bachir Zerrouki (1924-2004)
- Cheikh Larbi Bensari (1872-1964)
- Cheikha Tetma (1891-1962)
- El Hadj Hammadi Baghdadli (1797-1867)
- El Hadj Mohamed El Ghaffour (1930)
- Fewzi Kalfat (1959)
- Ghaouti Dib (1863-1917)
- Salah Boukli-Hacene (1946)
- Mahieddine Kamal Malti (1929-2011)
- Khair-Eddine Aboura (1908-1977)
- Lazaar Ben Dali Yahia (1894-1940)
- Maallem Mohamed Tchouar [1845-1933]
- Maâlem Ichoua Mediouni alias "Maqchich" (1829-1899)
- Maklouf Rouch alias "B'teina" (1858-1931)
- Ménouar Benattou (1847-1899)
- Mahmoud Bensari
- Mohamed Benchaabane alias "Boudelfa" (1853-1914)
- Mohamed Benghebrit
- Mohamed Bensmail (1892-1940)
- Mohammed Bouali
- Mohamed Dib (1861-1915)
- Mohamed Seghir Bessaoud (1876-1930)
- Moulai Ahmed Medeghri (1843-1925)
- Moulay Djilali Ziani-Cherif (1873-1939)
- Mustapha Aboura (1875-1935)
- Mustapha Belkhoudja (1917-1968)
- Mustapha Senouci Brixi (1919-2010)
- Omar Bekhchi (1884-1958)
- Redouane Bensari (1914-2002)
- Reinette l'Oranaise
- Rifel Mahmoud Kalfat
- Saoud l'Oranais
- Yahia Ghoul

==== Current celebrities ====
- Amina Karadja
- Anis Amanallah Kalfat
- Badr Eddine Khaldoun
- Brahim Hadj Kacem
- Dalila Mekadder
- Karim Boughazi
- Khalil Baba Ahmed
- Nisrine Ghenim
- Nouri Kouffi
- Rym Hakiki
- Larbi Louazani
- Leila Benmrah
- Lila Borsali

=== Morocco ===
==== Famous performers ====
- Bouchnak Benyounes dit Afendi
- Cheikh Mohammed Salah Chaabane
- Chaabane Sidi Mohammed
- Chaabane Nasreddine
- Kerzazi Cheikh Brahim
- Hamid Bazi
- Bahaa Ronda
- Ahmed Piro
- Amina Alaoui

=== France ===
- Françoise Atlan
