= Andalusi nubah =

North African music genre

Andalusī nūbah (نوبة أندلسيّة), also transliterated nūba, nūbā, or nouba (pl. nūbāt), or in its classical Arabic form, nawba, nawbah, or nōbah, is a music genre found in the North African Maghrib states of Morocco, Algeria, Tunisia, and Libya but, as the name indicates, it has its origins in Andalusi music. The name replaced the older use of sawt and originated from the musician waiting behind a curtain to be told it was his turn or nawbah by the sattar or curtain man.

The main schools of Andalusi nubah are the following

- In Algeria
  - Gharnati (Tlemcen)
  - Sanaa (Algiers)
  - Malouf (Constantine)
- In Tunisia
  - Malouf (Tunis)
- In Morocco
  - Tarab al ala
  - Gharnati (After 1830, following the migration of Algerians to Morocco during the French conquest)

== Form, texts, and performance ==
According to tradition, there were initially 24 nubat, one for each hour of the day. Each nuba must have a duration of 1 hour. Lyrics are sung by a soloist or in unison by a chorus and are chosen from the muwashshah or zajal poetic forms, which are sung in classical and colloquial Arabic, respectively.

An andalusi nubah uses one tab' (similar to a maqam, or mode) per performance, and includes several instrumental pieces as well as predominantly vocal pieces accompanied by instrumentation. These differ as to mizan (pl. mawazin) or rhythmic pattern (wazn, pl. awzan).

Formally the tempo increases while the awzan simply within each of five sections, called mawazin. The sections are introduced by short instrumental pieces and vary according to region, the name of a section indicating the wazn used:

- in Algeria (12 nubah and 4 incomplete): msaddar, btayhi, darj, insiraf, khlas
- in Tunisia (13 nubah): btaybhi, barwal, darj, khafif, khatm
- in Morocco (11 nubah): basit, qayim wa-nisf, btayhi, darj, quddam

The instrumental ensemble used includes the oud, violins, rabab, Maghreb rebab or rebec, nay, qanun, tambourine, and a goblet drum called darbuka. The instrumentalists also serve as chorus.

=== Scales ===
Name of the Nubah	Scale
Raml al-Máya (Morocco)	
Iráq al-Ajam (Morocco)	
Al-Máya (Morocco)	
Rasd (Morocco)	
Hijaz Al Kabir (Morocco)	
Hijaz (Morocco)	
Al-Ushshaq (Morocco)	
Al-Isbahán (Morocco)	
Al-Istihlál (Morocco)	
Gharíbat al-Housayn (Morocco)	
Rasd Al-dayl (Morocco)	

== Tunisia ==
In Tunisia, the 13 nubat are traditionally said to have been classified and organized by the 18th-century aristocrat Muhammad I ar-Rashid. He is also credited with the composition or commissioning of the 27 instrumental pieces (bashrafs, etc.) that introduce and separate the main vocal pieces in the nuba cycle. In this system, the 13 nubat are treated as a single overarching cycle, given a sequence in which, ideally, they should be performed.

== Morocco ==
The nubat of Morocco were collected and classified toward the end of the 18th century by the musician Al Haïk from Tetuan. Unlike the nubat from Algeria or Tunisia, Moroccan nubat are long, so it is rare for a Moroccan nuba to be played in its entirety.

== Discography ==
- Anthologie Al-âla: musique andaluci-marocaine. 12 vols.
  - Vol. 1: Nûbâ gharîbat al-husayn, version intégrale. Orchestre al-Brihi de Fès; Haj Abdelkrim al-Raïs, dir. 6-CD set. Auvidis W 260010. [Rabat]: Wizarat al-Thaqafah al-Maghribiyah = Royaume du Maroc Ministère de la Culture; Paris: Maison du cultures du monde / INEDIT, 1989.
  - Vol. 2: Nûbâ al-'ushshâq, version intégrale. Orchestre Moulay Ahmed Loukili de Rabat; Haj Mohammed Toud, dir. 6-CD set. Auvidis W 260014. [Rabat]: Wizarat al-Thaqafah al-Maghribiyah = Royaume du Maroc Ministère de la Culture; Paris: Maison du cultures du monde / INEDIT, 1990.
  - Vol. 3: Nûbâ al-isbihân, version intégrale. Orchestre du Conservatoire se Tétouan; Mohammed Larbi Temsamani, dir. 6-CD set. Auvidis W 260024. [Rabat]: Wizarat al-Thaqafah al-Maghribiyah = Royaume du Maroc Ministère de la Culture; Paris: Maison du cultures du monde / INEDIT, 1993.
  - Vol. 4: Nûbâ al-rasd, version intégrale. Orchestre de Tangier; Ahmed Zaytouni Sahraoui, dir. 6-CD set. Auvidis W 260027. [Rabat]: Wizarat al-Thaqafah al-Maghribiyah = Royaume du Maroc Ministère de la Culture; Paris: Maison du cultures du monde / INEDIT, 1995.
  - Vol. 5: Nûbâ al-îstihlâl, version intégrale / durée 7 h 40. Orchestre al-Brihi de Fès; Haj Abdelkrim al-Raïs, dir. 7-CD set. Auvidis W 260028. [Rabat]: Wizarat al-Thaqafah al-Maghribiyah = Royaume du Maroc Ministère de la Culture; Paris: Maison du cultures du monde / INEDIT, 1994.
  - Vol. 6: Nûbâ rasd al-dhil, version intégrale / durée 6 h 10. Orchestre Moulay Ahmed Loukili de Rabat; Haj Mohammed Toud, dir. 6-CD set. Auvidis W 260029. [Rabat]: Wizarat al-Thaqafah al-Maghribiyah = Royaume du Maroc Ministère de la Culture; Paris: Maison du cultures du monde / INEDIT, 1996.
  - Vol. 7: Nûbâ 'irâq al-'ajam, version intégrale. Orchestre de Tanger; Ahmed Zaytouni Sahraoui, dir. 7-CD set. Auvidis W 260030. [Rabat]: Wizarat al-Thaqafah al-Maghribiyah = Royaume du Maroc Ministère de la Culture; Paris: Maison du cultures du monde / INEDIT, 1996.
  - Vol. 8: Nûbâ al-hijâz al-kebîr, version intégrale / durée 7 h 30. Orchestre al-Brihi de Fès; Haj Abdelkrim al-Raïs, dir. 7-CD set. Auvidis W 260031. [Rabat]: Wizarat al-Thaqafah al-Maghribiyah = Royaume du Maroc Ministère de la Culture; Paris: Maison du cultures du monde / INEDIT, 1997.
  - Vol. 9: Nûbâ ramal al-mâya, version intégrale. Orchestre du Conservatoire de Tétouan; Mohammed Larbi Temsamani, dir. 8-CD set. Auvidis W 260032. [Rabat]: Wizarat al-Thaqafah al-Maghribiyah = Royaume du Maroc Ministère de la Culture; Paris: Maison du cultures du monde / INEDIT, 1997.
  - Vol. 10: Nûbâ al-hijâz al-msharqî, version intégrale. Orchestre al-Brihi de Fès; Haj Abdelkrim al-Raïs, dir. 7-CD set. Auvidis W 260033. [Rabat]: Wizarat al-Thaqafah al-Maghribiyah = Royaume du Maroc Ministère de la Culture; Paris: Maison du cultures du monde / INEDIT, 1998.
  - Vol. 11: Nûbâ al-mâya, version intégrale. Orchestre de Tanger; Ahmed Zaytouni Sahraoui, dir. 7-CD set. Auvidis W 260034. [Rabat]: Wizarat al-Thaqafah al-Maghribiyah = Royaume du Maroc Ministère de la Culture; Paris: Maison du cultures du monde / INEDIT, 1998.
  - Vol. 12: Les deux dernièrs quddâm. Ensemble Al-Âla; Mohammed Briouel, dir. 2-CD set. Auvidis W 260035. [Rabat]: Wizarat al-Thaqafah al-Maghribiyah = Royaume du Maroc Ministère de la Culture; Paris: Maison du cultures du monde / INEDIT, 1999.
- Maroc: Musique classique Andalou-Maghrébine. Nûba al-Hijâz al-Kabîr; Nûba al-'istihlâl. Orchestre de Fez; Haj Abdelkrim al-Raïs, dir. Collection dirigée par Pierre Toureille. Recorded 29 March 1984 at Studio 105, Radio France, Paris. 1-CD. Ocora C559016. Paris: Radio France; Harmonia Mundi, 1987.
- Música Andalusi, Escuela de Rabat, Orquesta de la Radio Televisión de Marruecos, Mûlây Ahmed Lúkílí, Msháliyya l-Kbíra, recorded in 1962, Btáyhi r-Rásd, recorded in 1958. Madrid: Pneuma, 1998.
- Música Andalusi, Escuela de Tetuán-Tánger, Orquesta del Conservatorio de Tetúan, Mohammed Ben Arbi Temsamani, Qá'im Wa Nisf Al Istihlál, recorded in 1960. Madrid: Pneuma, 1999.
- Música Andalusi, Escuela de Fez, Orquesta Brihi, Haj Abdelkrim al-Raïs, Qyddám Al-Máya, Cantor Muhammed Jsásí. Madrid: Pneuma, 2000.
- Musique arabo-andalouse classique. Nouba Hijaz M'Charqi; Nouba Raml al Mâya. Mahammed Al Moussadir (melismatic chant); Ahmed Chikhi (voice and oud); Mustapha Amri (oud and alto kamanja); Mohammed Diouri (swissèn); Hadj Mohammed Lahlou (tar); Hadj Ustad Mohammed Masano Tazzi (rebab), dir. Recorded June 1987 at Hay al Amal, Fez, Marocco. 1-CD. Le Chant du Monde CMT 274 1007. [Paris]: Le Cant du Monde, 1995.
- Nawba hijaz la-msharqi. Françoise Atlan (soprano), Abdelfettah Bennis (tenor), Noureddine Tahri (tenor); Abdelkrim Raïs Andalusian Orchestra of Fès; Mohammed Briouel, dir. Recorded 18 October 1998, in the Mnehbi Palace, in the Medina at Fès, Morocco. 1-CD. Erato 3984-25499-2.Paris: Erato Disques, S. A., 1999.

== See also ==
- Andalusian classical music
- Ma'luf
