= Mohamed Bajeddoub =

Mohamed Bajeddoub محمد باجدوب
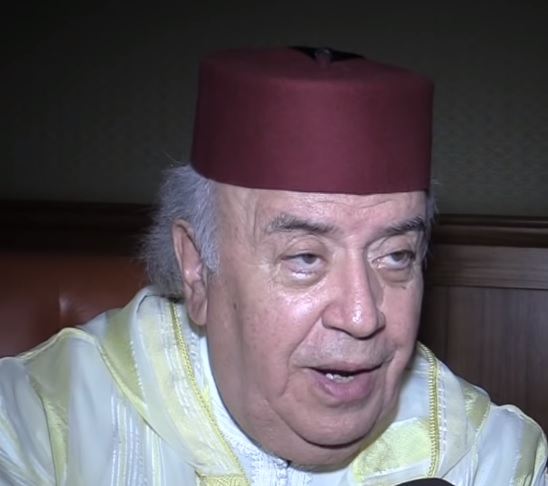

Background information
- Born: 1945 (age 79–80); Safi
- Genres: Andalusian music (al-Ala)

Mohamed Bajeddoub (Arabic: محمد باجدوب; born 1945 in Safi, Morocco) is an acclaimed Moroccan artist of the traditional Andalusian music.

As a youngster he regularly attended Sufi ceremonials in Sheikh Abu Mohammed Salih where they used to sing the al-Burda in Choirs. Aged 15, he studied under Sidi Said al-Qadiri in Salé and Mohamed Tbayek in Marrakesh. In Salé he progressively attracted interest and relative fame, and eventually achieved a status nationwide.

He has a distinctive style that is considered modern in comparison to more traditional Andalusian artists such as Mohammed Loukili, and sings in a tenor voice.
