= Andalusi classical music =

Music genre

Andalusi classical music (Arabic: طرب أندلسي, romanized: ṭarab ʾandalusī; Spanish: música andalusí), also called Andalusi music or Arab-Andalusian music, is a genre of music originally developed in al-Andalus by the Muslim Arab and Moorish population. It then spread and influenced many different styles across the Maghreb (Algeria, Libya, Morocco, Tunisia) mainly after the Reconquista. It originated in the music of al-Andalus (Muslim Iberia) between the 9th and 15th centuries. Some of its lyrics derive from poems by famous authors such as al-Mu'tamid ibn Abbad, Ibn Khafaja, al-Shushtari, and Ibn al-Khatib.

== History ==
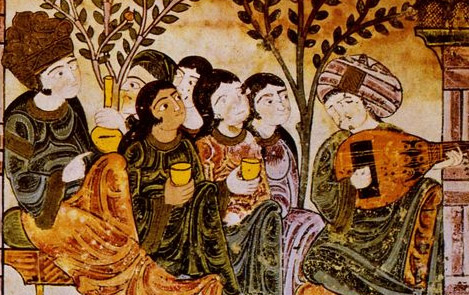
Qayna slave singer and musicians in a 13th-century Maghrebi or Andalusi manuscript

Andalusi music was allegedly born in the Emirate of Córdoba (Al-Andalus) in the 9th century. Born and raised in Iraq, Ziryâb (d. 857), who later became court musician of Abd al-Rahman II in Córdoba, is sometimes credited with its invention. Later, the poet, composer, and philosopher Ibn Bajjah (d. 1139) of Saragossa is said to have combined Christian with Muslim music to produce a new style that spread across Iberia and North Africa.

By the 10th century, Muslim Iberia had become a center for art music and the manufacture of musical instruments. These spread gradually to Provence, influencing French troubadours and trouvères and eventually reaching the rest of Europe. The English words lute, rebec, guitar, and naker derive from the Arabic oud, rabab, qithara and naqareh, although some Arabic terms (qithara, for example) had been derived in their turn from Vulgar Latin, Greek and other languages like Persian.

Aḥmad al-Tifāshī (d. 1253) in his encyclopedic work Faṣl al-khiṭāb fī madārik al-ḥ awāss al-khams li-ʾūlī l-albāb (فصل الخطاب في مدارك الحواس الخمس لاولي الالباب) divided the Andalusi musical tradition into four types: nashīd, ṣawt, muwashshaḥ, and zajal. A nashīd was classical monorhyme poem consisting of istihlal (استهلال – a precomposed vocal prelude, probably with instrumental response) and ʿamal (عمل – a composition combining vocal and instrumental elements). A ṣawt was also a classical monorhyme poem with ʿamal, but it did not include istihlal. Works of nashīd and ṣawt, in the classical tradition, circulated first as shiʿr (poetry) and were later set to music, whereas the strophic muwashshaḥ and zajal works were apparently composed directly as songs, at least early on. In a cryptic passage, al-Tifāshī attributes the emergence of a new style to Ibn Bajja, one that combined "the songs of the Christians with those of the East, thereby inventing a style found only in Andalus, toward which the temperament of its people inclined, so that they rejected all others", but the nature and details of this new tradition are unclear.

Ibn Sanāʾ al-Mulk (d. 1211), author of Dār aṭ-ṭirāz fī ʿamal al-muwashshaḥāt (دار الطراز في عمل الموشحات), wrote the most detailed surviving musical description of the muwashshaḥ. Some of the muwashshaḥāt had lyrics that fit their melodies (sometimes through melisma), while others had improvised nonsense syllables to fill out the melodic line—a practice that survives to the present with relevant sections labeled as shughl (شُغل 'work') in songbooks.

Mass resettlements of Muslims and Sephardi Jews from Córdoba, Seville, Valencia, and Granada, fleeing the Reconquista, further expanded the reach of Andalusi music, though not without changes. In North Africa, the Andalusi music traditions all feature a suite known as a nūba (colloquial Arabic from the formal Arabic nawba: a "turn" or opportunity to perform), a musical form which may have originated in Islamic Iberia, but took on many different forms in the new environments. Moreover, these migrants from the 13th century on encountered ethnic Andalusi communities that had migrated earlier to North Africa, which helped this refined music to take root and spread among wider audiences.

=== Andalusi music in Jewish societies ===
In his book Jews of Andalusia and the Maghreb on the musical traditions in Jewish societies of North Africa, Haim Zafrani writes: "In the Maghreb, the Muslims and Jews have piously preserved the Spanish-Arabic music .... In Spain and Maghreb, Jews were ardent maintainers of Andalusi music and the zealous guardians of its old traditions ...." Indeed, as in so many other areas of Andalusi culture and society, Jews have played an important role in the evolution and preservation of the musical heritage of al-Andalus throughout its history. From the very beginning, one of Ziryāb's colleagues at the court of ʿAbd al-Raḥmān II was a fine musician Manṣūr al-Yahūdī ("Mansur the Jew"). The scholars Avraham Eilam-Amzallag and Edwin Seroussi further highlight the important role played by Jews in the history of Andalusi music, pointing out that not only have many important North African Andalusi musicians been Jews, but also Moroccan Jewish communities today in Israel preserve Andalusi melodies and even song texts in their religious music.

=== Lyrical song texts of Andalusi music ===
A number of old manuscripts preserve song texts and elements of Andalusi musical philosophy. The oldest surviving collection of these texts is found in two chapters from Aḥmad al-Tīfāshī's Mutʿat al-ʾismāʿ fī ʿilm al-samāʿ (متعة الإسماع في علم السماع) (ca. 1253). More recent is a document entitled, al-ʿAdharā al-māyisāt fī-l-ʾazjāl wa-l-muwashshaḥāt (العذارى المايسات في الأزجال والموشحات, "The Virgins Swaying for Zajals and Muwashshaḥs"), which probably dates to the middle of the 15th century and is said to be linked to the Andalusi music of Tlemcen in Algeria. By far the best-documented Andalusi tradition is that of Morocco, with the first surviving anthology having been produced by Muḥammad al-Būʿiṣāmī (d. c. 1738). But the most important collection was Kunnāsh al-Ḥāʾik (the first of several versions is dated 1202/1788), which was revised by the wazīr Muhammad Ibn al-'Arabi al-Jāmi'i in 1886, with numerous copies in libraries in Morocco, Madrid, London and Paris).

Each of the modern nations of North Africa kows at least one style of Andalusi music. In Morocco the secular instrumental version is called al-Āla (الآلة), while the religious a cappella style is called al-samāʿ wa-l-madīḥ (السماع والمديح). In Algeria there are three styles: al-Gharnāṭī (referring to Granada) in the West, al-ṣanʿa (الصنعة) in the region around Algiers, and al-maʾlūf (المألوف) in the East. The Tunisian and Libyan traditions are also called maʾlūf.

== Today ==
A suite form, the Andalusi nubah, is the basis of al-āla. Though it has roots in al-Andalus, the modern nūba (نوبة) is probably a North African creation. Each nūba is dominated by one musical mode. It is said that there used to be twenty-four nūbāt linked to each hour of the day, but in Algeria there are only sixteen, Tunisia only twelve, and in Morocco, eleven have survived (although some nūbāt [نوبات] in Morocco incorporate more than one mode—26 modes in all). Nūba structures vary considerably among the various national traditions. In Morocco, each nūba is divided into five parts called mîzân (ميزان), each with a corresponding rhythm. The rhythms occur in the following order in a complete nūba (though an entire nūba is never performed in one sitting):

1. basît بسيط (6/4)
2. qâ'im wa niṣf قائم ونصف (8/4)
3. btâyhî بطايحي (8/4)
4. darj درج (4/4)
5. quddâm قدام (3/4 or 6/8)

Andalusi classical music orchestras are spread across the Maghreb, including the cities of:

- Algeria: Tlemcen, Nedroma, Cherchell, Algiers, Béjaïa, Blida, Constantine, Annaba, Souk Ahras, Sidi Bel Abbès, Oran, Koléa, Blida, Mostaganem
  - In Algeria, three main styles or schools are to be found:
    - The Gharnati of the region of Tlemcen.
    - The Sana'a of the region of Algiers.
    - The Ma'luf style in the east of the country in Constantine and Annaba.
- Morocco: Fes, Meknes, Tetuan, Salé, Oujda, Rabat, Tangiers, Chefchaouen, Safi

Andalusi music performed by the artist Abdeslam Sefiani at a wedding in the city of Salé, Morocco, November 2025

  - The tarab al-āla, meaning "instrumental music", as opposed to religious music, which is primarily vocal, is predominant.
  - The al-samāʿ wa-l-madīḥ, a religious a cappella style that makes use of very similar melodic, rhythmic and textual materials as Al-Ala.
  - The Malhun is a poeto-musical style sung mainly in Al-Ala modes
  - The Gharnati of the school of Tlemcen is also played, mainly, in Rabat andOujda.
- Tunisia: Tunis, Testour, and Kairouan.
- Libya: Tripoli
  - In Tunisia and Libya, the Maʾlūf is the main style.
- Outside of the Maghreb exists the Israeli Andalusian Orchestra, that plays classical Andalusi music together with piyyutim from the tradition of Sephardi Jews.

They use instruments including oud (lute), rabab (rebec), darbouka (goblet drums), ṭaʿrīja (tambourine), qanún (zither), and kamanja (violin). More recently, other instruments have been added to the ensemble, including piano, Double bass, cello, and even banjos, saxophones, and clarinets, though these are rare.

== Influence ==
Al-Andalus was probably the main route of transmission of a number of Near Eastern musical instruments used in European music: the lute from the oud, rebec from the Maghreb rebab, the guitar from qitara and Greek kithara, and the naker from the naqareh. Further terms fell into disuse in Europe: adufe from al-duff, alboka from al-buq, añafil from an-nafir, exabeba from al-shabbaba (flute), atabal (bass drum) from al-tabl, atambal from al-tinbal, the balaban, sonajas de azófar from sunuj al-sufr, the conical bore wind instruments, and the xelami from the sulami or fistula (flute or musical pipe).

Most scholars believe that Guido of Arezzo's Solfège musical notation system had its origins in a Latin hymn, but others suggest that it may have had Andalusi origins instead. According to Meninski in his Thesaurus Linguarum Orientalum (1680), Solfège syllables may have been derived from the syllables of an Arabic (Moorish) solmization system Durar Mufaṣṣalāt ("Separated Pearls"). However, there is no documentary evidence for this theory, and no Arabian musical manuscripts employing sequences from the Arabic alphabet are known to exist. Henry George Farmer believes that there is no firm evidence on the origins of the notation, and therefore the Arabian origin theory and the hymnal origin theories are equally credible. Although the philosopher al-Kindī (d. 259/874) and the author Abū l-Faraj al-Iṣfahānī (d. 355/967) both mention music writing systems, they were descriptive and based on lute fingerings, and thus complicated to use. No practical, indigenous system of music writing existed in the Islamic world before the colonial era.

Some scholars have speculated that the troubadour tradition was brought to France from al-Andalus by the first recorded troubadour, William IX, Duke of Aquitaine (d. 1126), whose father had fought in the siege and sack of Barbastro in 1064 and brought back at least one female slave singer. It is likely that young William's taste in music and poetry was thus influenced by al-Andalus. George T. Beech observes that while the sources of William's inspirations are uncertain, he did have Spanish individuals within his extended family, and he may have been friendly with some Europeans who could speak Arabic. Regardless of William's involvement in the tradition's creation, Magda Bogin states that Andalusi poetry was likely one of several influences on European "courtly love poetry". J. B. Trend has also asserted that the poetry of troubadours was connected to Andalusi poetry.

== See also ==
- Malhun
- Andalusi nubah
- Mohammed al-Haik
- Abdessadeq Cheqara
- Mohamed Bajeddoub
- Music of Algeria
- Music of Morocco
- Music of Tunisia
- Music of Libya
- Amsterdam Andalusian Orchestra
