= Music in Tunisian Arabic =

Music in Tunisian Arabic has appeared in the 17th century. It has developed a lot since the 19th century and has spread all over Tunisia mainly after the creation of Radio Tunis and Établissement de la radiodiffusion-télévision tunisienne. Nowadays, Tunisian Arabic has become the main language of songs in Tunisia including Tunisian music, Underground music and Opera.

== The beginnings ==
The oldest lyrics found written in Tunisian Arabic date back to the 17th century. Their author was Sheykh Abu el-Hassan el-Karray, who died in 1693 in the medina quarter of Sfax, and wrote a poem in Tunisian Arabic during his youth:

عَدِّيت في الصُّغر عَدِّيت
يَا حَسرتِي على زمَانِي
بـالطَّار و الدُّفّ غَنِّيت
و زهِيت بـحُسن المَعَانِي
لـلرَّبّ مُولَايَا وَلِّيت
تَوبَة نَصُوحَة عطَانِي

ɛaddīt fī il-ṣuġr ɛaddīt,
yā ḥasrtī ɛlā zmānī,
b- il-ṭār w il-duff ġannīt,
w zhīt b-ḥusn il-maɛānī,
l- il-ṛabb mūlāyā wallīt,
tawba naṣūḥa ɛṭānī.

I have passed my childhood
that has already finished
singing, playing with drums
and enjoying the meaning of songs.
Now, I returned to the right way
thanks to God's blessing.

Moreover, another Tunisian Arabic poem was written later in the 17th century to cite the qualities of Karray:

خموسي يا كراي قاصد ليك بـنية
جيتك يا مولى الراي تبري سقمان بيا
شيلة مولى البرهان و البركة وصايا
يا شيخ يا سلطان بالله كون معايا
يكفي من ذا الهجران وصلك يبري دايا
لأني فاني عاشق، حبك زاد عليا
خموسي يا كراي قاصد ليك بـنية

xmūsī yā karrāy qāṣid līk b- niyya
jītik yā mūlā il-ṛāy tubrī suqmān biyyā
šīlatt mūlā il-burhān w il-baṛka waṣṣāyā
yā šīx yā sulṭān b- il-lah kūn mɛāyā
yikfī min đā il-hijṛān waṣlik yubrī dāyā
l- annī fānī ɛāšiq, ḥubbik zād ɛlayyā
xmūsī yā karrāy qāṣid līk b- niyya

Saint Karray, I believe in you.
I came to you to cure my weakness
by the mercy of God and by blessing me.
Oh Shaykh! Oh Sir! Please Support me.
Stop leaving me. Your help will recover me.
Because I am lethal and compassionate, I truly love you.
Saint Karray, I believe in you.

The effective beginning of songs written in Tunisian Arabic was in the early 19th century, when Tunisian Jews in the Beylik of Tunis began writing songs in Tunisian Arabic about love, betrayal and other libertine subjects. The current strengthened at the beginning of the 20th century and affected the Tunisian malouf and folklore. Judeo-Tunisian song flowered in the 1930s, with such Jewish artists as Cheikh El Afrit and Habiba Msika.

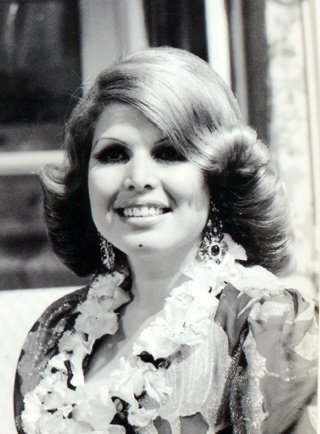
Naama

This tendency was promoted by the creation of Radio Tunis in 1938, which allowed many musicians to better disseminate their works and helped spread the use of Tunisian Arabic in songs. The pioneers of Tunisian Arabic song between 1930 and 1950 drew most of their inspiration from traditional Tunisian music, oriental or to occidental colors were Kaddour Srarfi, Hedi Jouini, Saliha, Salah El Mahdi, Hassiba Rochdi, Fethia Khaïri, Hassiba Rochdi, Mohamed Triki, Mohamed Jamoussi, Sadok Thraya and Ali Riahi.

== The rise of Tunisian formal songs ==
Following the creation of the ERTT broadcasting organization in 1966, a generation of composers and interpreters, mostly working in the ERTT orchestra, emerged. In this wave, the range occupies a prominent place. Kalaï Ridha, Salah El Mahdi (regarded as a disciple of Tarnane), Kaddour Srarfi, Ali Shalgham, Chedly Anwar, Abdelhamid Sassi and others helped to train several singers, including Naâma, Oulaya, Zouheïra Salem, Soulef, Safia Chamia, Youssef Temimi, Mustapha Charfi, Hana Rached, Choubeila Rached, Ezzeddine Idir and many others.

Tahar Gharsa (another disciple of Tarnane) worked to promote the characteristically modal and rhythmic traditional music written with Tunisian Arabic lyrics. The director Raoul Journo, in the same line, is a judeo-Tunisian singer, distinguished by his interpretation of taâlila (traditional songs associated with birth, circumcision, marriage and other rites). This kind of music developed under the National Troupe of Music, created in the early 1980s.

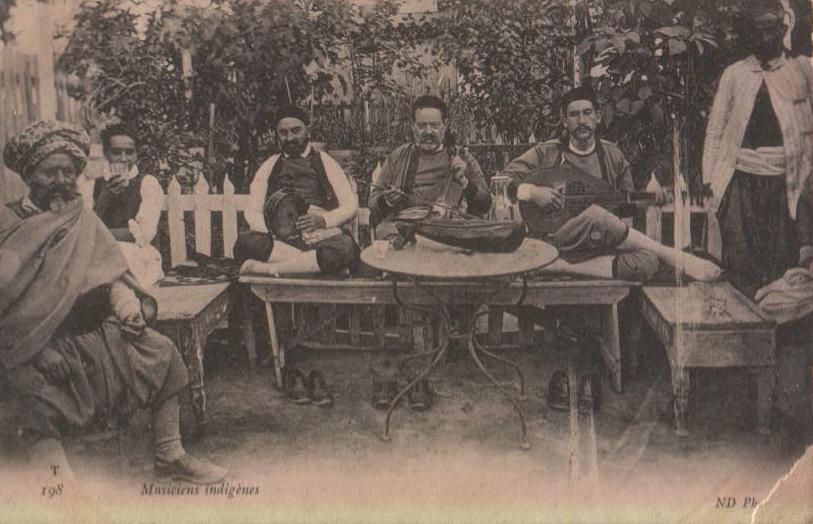
Band of popular music of the period 1900–1950

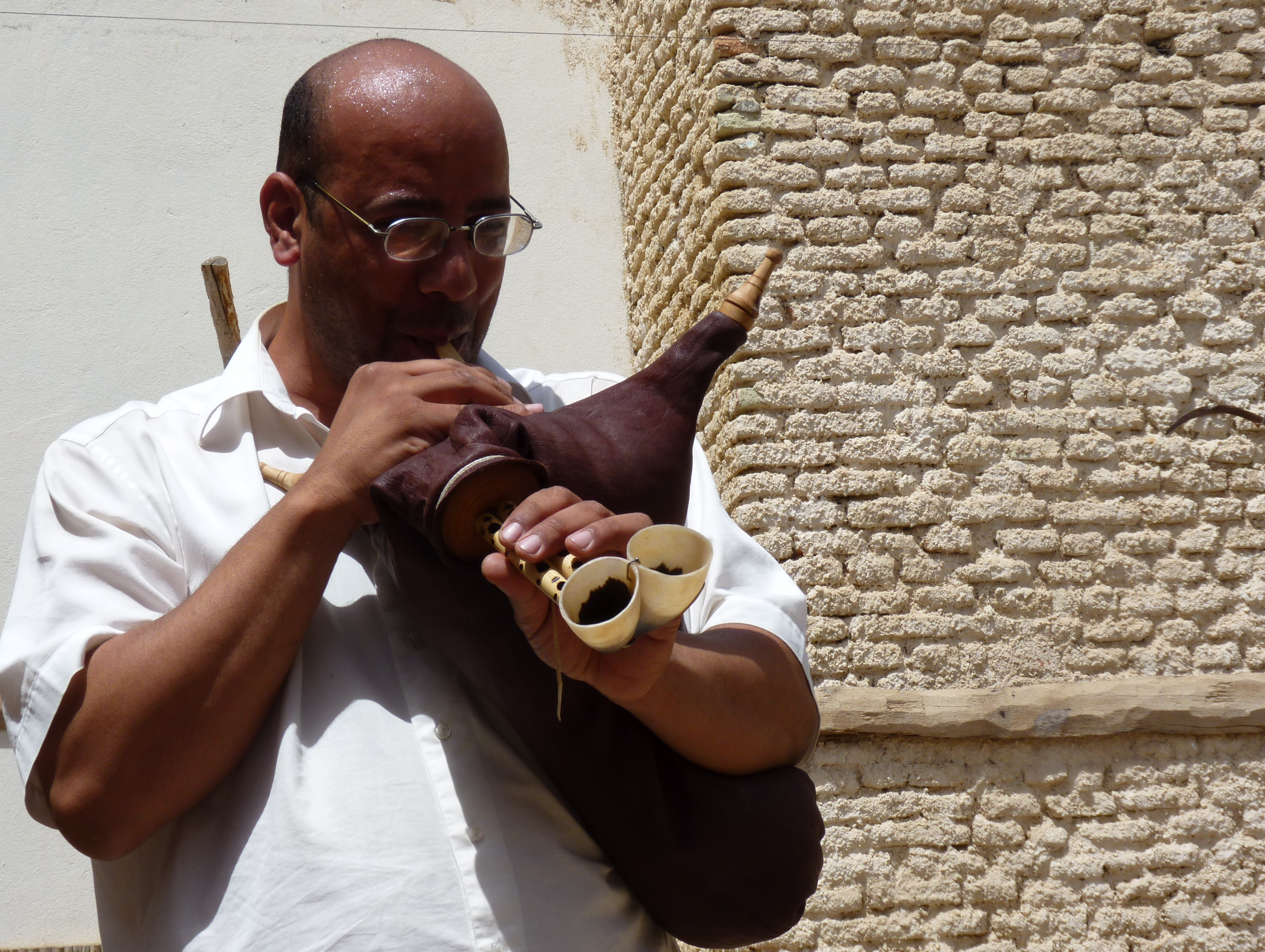
Mizwad player in Tozeur

== The rise of Tunisian popular songs ==
At the same time, popular music developed in the early 19th century, using Tunisian Arabic poems accompanied by Tunisian musical instruments. Popular music includes Rboukh that is accompanied by a Mezoued, Salhi that is accompanied by a Ney and Sufi music that are religious songs mainly accompanied by Tambourins. This kind of music was promoted by the National Troupe of the Popular Arts, created in 1962. Later adaptation and promotion of popular songs, especially by Ahmed Hamza and later Kacem Kefi, further developed Tunisian music. Natives of Sfax, they were both influenced by Mohamed Ennouri and Mohamed Boudaya, leading masters of popular music in that city. Nowadays, this kind of music is very popular.

Tunisian Arabic became the main variety used in writing lyrics of songs in Tunisia and even the main technical words in music have their synonyms in Tunisian Arabic.

== Underground and alternative music ==
In the early 1990s, underground music in Tunisian Arabic appeared. This mainly consisted of rap and was not successful in the beginning because of the lack of media coverage. Tunisian Underground music became successful in the 2000s, thanks to its spread over the Internet, and came to involve other alternative genres like reggae and rock. Underground music reached a height of popularity during and just after the Tunisian Revolution of 2011, as it spoke to the dire social matters faced by people in Tunisia.

In 2014, the first opera songs in Tunisian Arabic had appeared. They were the ones of Yosra Zekri that were written by Emna Rmilli and composed by Jalloul Ayed.
