= Sonia M'barek =

Tunisian singer

Sonia M'barek سنية مبارك
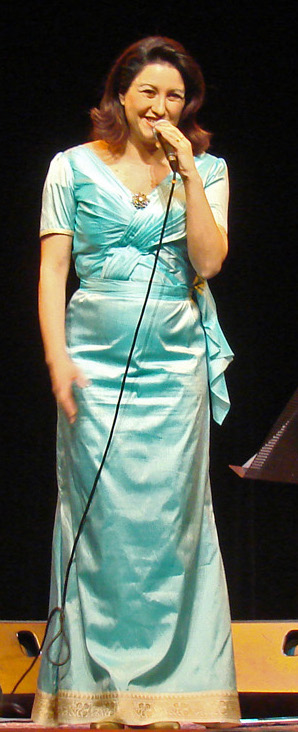
- Sonia M'barek performing at the Institut du Monde Arabe in 2009

Background information
- Born: 1969 (age 56–57); Sfax, Tunisia
- Genres: Arabic music
- Occupation: Singer
- Years active: 1978–present

Sonia M'barek (سنية مبارك, also spelled Sonia Mbarek, 1969– ) is a Tunisian singer of classical Arabic music and related genres. She was Minister of Culture from January to August 2016.

== Early life ==
M'barek was born in Sfax, Tunisia. At age nine, she sang traditional Tunisian music (malouf) with the Municipal Theatre of Tunis, under the direction of Tahar Gharsa. At 12, she made her first television appearance, interpreting "Ahkili aliha ya baba", a children's song composed by and performed with Adnène Chaouachi. The success of this song thrust M'barek into the artistic domain.

== Education ==
A student at the National Conservatory of Music at Tunis, she received a degree in Arabic music in 1986, and in 1987, with composer Rachid Yeddes, received the prize for the best song at the Festival de la Chanson Tunisienne (for "Khali el hozn baîd alik"). In 1990, she realized a project inspired by world music, entitled "Musiques sans frontières" ("Music without borders"), which she presented at the Festival International d'Hammamet.

== Career ==
In 1992, M'barek released her first album, Liberté. In 1993, she collaborated with the oud player Ali Sriti and his student Anouar Brahem, with whom she gave over 30 concerts classical music concerts, which were released on an album called Tarab. In 1997, she released her second solo album, Tawchih, followed in 1999 with Takht, which was distributed throughout Europe, the United States, and Japan by World Network, a German record label. That same year, she gave a concert in Paris, at Café de la Danse, for the Festival Les Belles Nuits du Ramadan.

In 2000, she performed at the Kennedy Center in Washington, D.C., during the National African Summit, and during a tour of the francophone world, she also gave a concert at the United Nations in New York City (Dag-Hammarskjöld Auditorium), and participated in the festival Voix de femmes in Brussels, celebrating the opening of the Halles de Schaerbeek/Hallen van Schaarbeek. M'barek then released the albums Tir el Minyiar in 2003 and Romances in 2004.

== Personal life ==
M'Barek is married and has two children.

== Discography ==
- Liberté (1992)
- Tarab (1994)
- TAWCHIH (1997)
- Takht (1999)
- Tir el Miniar (2003)
- Romances (2007)

== Awards and honors ==
- Didon Prize for Female Excellence (Tunisia, 1995)
- Diapason d'Or for her CD Takht (France, 2000)
- Medal of the City of Clermont-Ferrand for Intercultural Exchange (France, 2011)
- Fatima al-Fihriya Award for Promoting Women's Access to Education and Professional Responsibilities in the Mediterranean (Tunisia, 2018)

== Accolades ==
Between 2005 and 2008, M'barek was the first woman to act as director of the Festival de la Chanson Tunisienne, which is organized by the Tunisian Minister of Culture. She has been a member of l'Association des Etudes Internationales since 1995, a member of the executive office of The Rachidia from 2001 to 2003 and, since 2002, goodwill ambassador of the Tunisian Association for the Fight against Cancer.

== Publications ==
- Le Statut du musicien en Tunisie, Paris, L'Harmattan, 2018
