= Saliha (singer) =

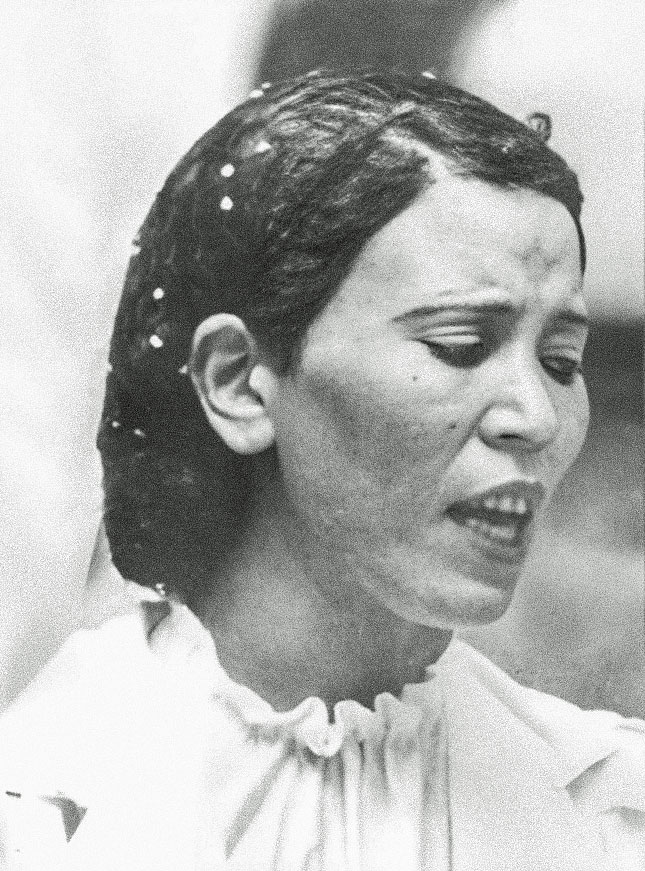

Background information
- Born: December 15, 1914
- Origin: Tunisia
- Died: November 26, 1958 (aged 43–44)
- Genres: Arabic music, Tunisian music
- Occupation: Singer
- Instrument: Vocals
- Years active: 1938–1958

Saliha (Tunisian Arabic: صليحة, romanized: Ṣāliḥa) (born December 15, 1914, in Nebeur in El Kef, died 26 November 1958) was a Tunisian singer. Her birth name was Salouha Ben Ibrahim Ben Abdelhafidh.

== Biography ==
Salouha Ben Ibrahim Ben Abdelhafidh, later known as Saliha or Sallouha, was born in 1914 in Nebeur. She appeared on stage for the first time in 1938. On the occasion of the inauguration of Radio Tunis, she sang at the Théâtre municipal de Tunis during a concert broadcast live on the radio. Then she crossed paths with Mustapha Sfar, founder of The Rachidia, who invited her to join the institution marked by the presence of Chafia Rochdi. There, the musicians Khemaïs Tarnane, Mohamed Triki and Salah El Mahdi composed a series of songs for her, the lyrics of which were written by poets belonging to Taht Essour. Right from the start, these songs were such hits that Abdelhamid Ben Aljia said "Saliha and La Rachidia are one."

Saliha's rich repertoire, charismatic charm and deep voice earned her the appellation "kawkab echarq ettounnisia" from critics. She left her mark on Tunisian music and song during the first half of the 20th century.

Freg Ghzeli (My friend left me), Khali Baddalni (My uncle dropped me), Zaama Yesafi Eddahr (Time does not forgive) and ya machkaya (The complainant), were all composed by Mohamed Triki, and are among his most famous songs.

Years of glory left Sallouha exhausted. Her death in 1958, following an incurable disease, was a painful national event; 22,000 people formed the funeral procession in Sidi Yahia.

== Discography ==
Songs
Touness elyoum brat
Ya khdoud et-toffah
Om lahsan ghannat
Mridh fani
Aàïoun soud
Ya khil salem
Men frag ghzali
Bakhnoug
Kif dar kass el hobb
Habbitha ma lgit menha manja
Na wejjemel frida
Sag najàek sag
Aàordhouni zouz sbaya
Nenni ahna mnam
Fel ghorba fenani
Chargi gheda bezzine
Màa el àazzaba
Rabbi àatani kol chay bekmalou
Dar el falak
Ya khlila
Wadaàouni
Ya khaïna
Hozt-al-baha
Yalli boodek dhayaà fekri
Sag najàak ber-ranna
Hajr el Habib
Awtari-w-oudi
Ya laimi àazzine
Ghzali nafar
Mouhal kelmet ah
