= Music of Tunisia =

Element of Tunisian culture

Tunisia is a North African country with a predominantly Arabic-speaking population. The country is best known for ma'luf, a kind of music imported from Andalusia after the Moors expulsion in the 15th century. Though in its modern form, ma'luf is likely very dissimilar to any music played more than four centuries ago, it does have its roots in Spain and Portugal, and is closely related to genres with a similar history throughout North Africa, including ma'luf's Libyan cousin, Algerian gharnati and Moroccan ala or Andalusi. During the Ottoman era, ma'luf was influenced by Turkish music. However, Tunisian repertoires, styles and also instruments remain distinctive – the ʻūd tūnsī is an emblematic case. This is a close relative of the 'uds associated with Algeria and also Morocco.

20th-century musicians from Tunisia include Anouar Brahem, an oud player, Jasser Haj Youssef, a composer and a violin player, and El Azifet, a rare all-female orchestra, as well as well-known vocalist Raoul Journo, singer and oud player Dhafer Youssef, singer, guitarist and lutenist Nabil Khemir, Lotfi Bouchnak, Khemaïs Tarnane, Saliha, Saleh Mehdi, Ali Riahi, Hedi Jouini, Fethia Khairi, Cheikh El Afrit, Oulaya and Naâma.

In 1982, the pop-rock composer and singer F.R. David (born Elli Robert Fitoussi) peaked the worldwide charts with his song Words (don't come easy).

Popular singers include Nabiha Karaouli, Sonia Mbarek, Saber Rebaï, Soufia Sedik, Amina Fakhet, Nawal Ghachem, Latifa, Emel Mathlouthi and the late Thekra.

21st century alternative music groups include RedStar, JenJoon, Neshez, Zemeken, Aspirine, Kerkennah, Myrath, Ymyrgar and Checkpoint 303. (see Tunisian underground music)

Modern music festivals in Tunisia include Tabarka Jazz Festival, Testour's Arab Andalusian Music Festival and the Sahara Festival in Douz.

== Ma'luf ==
Ma'luf is played by small orchestras, consisting of violins, percussion, qanun and flutes. Modern ma'luf has some elements of Berber music in the rhythms, but is seen as a successor to the cultural heights reached by Muslim Andalusia. ma'luf has been called "an emblem of (Tunisian) national identity" . Nevertheless, ma'luf can not compete commercially with popular music, much of it Egyptian, and it has only survived because of the efforts of the Tunisian government and a number of private individuals. ma'luf is still performed in public, especially at weddings and circumcision ceremonies, though recordings are relatively rare. The term ma'luf translates as familiar or customary.

Baron Rodolphe d'Erlanger was an important figure of classical Tunisian music. He collected the rules and history of ma'luf, which filled six volumes, and set up The Rachidia, an important conservatory which is still in use.

=== Structure ===
The lyrics of ma'luf are based on the qasidah, a form of classical Arabic poetry, and comes in many forms, including the muwashshah, which abandons many of qasidah's rules, shgul, a very traditional form, and zajal, a modern genre with a unique format.

The most important structural element of ma'luf, however, is the Andalusi nuba, a two-part suite in a single maqam (an Arab mode organized by quarter-tones), which lasts about an hour. A nuba is a musical form introduced to North Africa with the migration of Muslim inhabitants of Spain in the 13 and 14th Century. It is divided to many parts :Isstifta7 Msader which are instrumental pieces Then come Attouq and the Silsla which introduce to the poems. The sung pieces begin with the Btaihia: A set of poem composed on the Main mode of the Nuba (there are several Modes in Tunisian music Thaiil raml Sikah tounssia Ispahan Isbaaïn) on a heavily syncopated rhythm called BtaiHi. Then come al barawil, Al khfeiif Al Akhtam which close the nuba. The rhythms grow fast from a component to anthem of the Nuba. Each component of a Nouba has its specific rhythm which are the same in all the 13 Nouba known today.

=== History ===
The earliest roots of the ma'luf can be traced to a court musician from Baghdad named Ziryab. He was expelled from the city in 830, and traveled west, stopping finally at Kairouan, the first Muslim city of great power in Africa. The city was a center for North African (Maghebian) culture and was the capital of the Aghlabite dynasty. Ziryab crossed the Maghreb and then entered Cordoba during a period of cultural innovation among the diverse inhabitants of the region. He became a court musician again and used influences from the local area, the Maghreb, and his native Middle East to form a distinctively Andalusian style.

Beginning in the 13th century, Muslims fleeing persecution by Christians in what is now Spain and Portugal settled in cities across North Africa, including Tunis, bringing with them their music. Tunisian ma'luf, and its closely related cousin in Libya, were later influenced by Ottoman music. This process peaked in the middle of the 18th century, when the Bey of Tunisia, Muhammad al-Rashid, a musician, used Turkish-style instrumental compositions in his work and firmly set the structure of the Nuba. Though his system has evolved considerably, most of the instrumental sections of modern nubat are derived from al-Rashid.

After the fall of the Ottoman Empire, Tunisia became a French protectorate and the declining ma'luf was revitalized. Baron Rodolphe d'Erlanger, a French-naturalized Bavarian living near Tunis, commission a collection of ancient works, working with Ali al-Darwish of Aleppo. Al-Darwish and d'Erlanger's pioneering study of Tunisian music was presented at the International Congress of Arabic Music, held in 1932. Baron Rodolphe d'Erlanger died only a few months after the congress, which revolutionized Arab music across the world. In Tunisia, the meeting inspired The Rachidia, which was formed in 1934 to preserve the ma'luf. The Rachidia undertook some alterations, revising lyrics that were considered profane, and also constructed two performance spaces in the old city of Tunis. The institute also helped to transition ma'luf from being performed by folk ensembles with only a few instruments (including 'ud, tar, darbuka, rabab and bendir) to symphonic pieces inspired by Western classical music and Egyptian ensembles.

The most influential such orchestra was called the Rachidia Orchestra, led by violinist Muhammad Triki. Rashidiyya Orchestra used a large chorus as well as contrabass, cello, violin, nay, qanun, and 'ud sharqi, and followed the developing rules of Arab musical theory and notation. The thirteen surviving nubat were created during this time, distilled from the highly divergent folk forms still in use. Western musical notation was used; along with the popularization of recorded music, the use of improvisation quickly declined. These changes helped to popularize ma'luf, though not without critics and gave the music a reputation as classical art music.

After Tunisian independence in 1957, the country's first president, Habib Bourguiba, promoted the ma'luf, recognizing its unifying potential. The then-director of the Rashidiyya Orchestra, Salah el-Mahdi, wrote the Tunisian national anthem, and eventually also became the leader of the music department of the Ministry of Cultural Affairs. His musical theories became a major part of the Orchestra, as well as its successor, Institut Supérieur de Musique.

== Mezwed ==
Purely Tunisian music with pop Tunisian touch and Andalusi nubah cover. Most popular mezwed singers are Hedi Habbouba, Salah Farzit, Habib el Khal, Samir Loussif, Hedi Donia, Faouzi Ben Gamra, Zina Gasriniya, Fatma Bousseha, Nour Chiba. Mezwed, or mezoued, is both an instrument and genre of music. The instrument is like that of a bagpipe, although it is made with goat skin. The music mezwed is based around the instrument with singers and a darbouka beat. The more modernized version has more modern instruments with the Mezoued.

== Salhi ==
Another authentic Tunisian genre, known as Salhi, can be heard on these tracks from 1931 , some of which are sung by Ibrahim Ben Hadj Ahmed, and others by another singer called Ben Sassi. The style may be related to Berber music, and is just as ancient and authentic as a facet of the (Tunisian) national identity.

== New genres in Tunisian music ==
New genres of music in Tunisia include Tunisian pop music, opera, electronic music, trip hop, hip hop, rap and metal music.

The most famous pop singers are Manel Amara, Sabri Mosbah, Ruka, Asma Othmani, Imen Mehrzi, Ghada Maatouk.

The most famous rap and hip hop singers are Balti, JenJoon, Samara, Tchiggy, Hedi L’artiste, Raf, Amriano, Badboy 7low, Joujma, L'arabe, Arslén, Ferr, A.L.A, Akram Mag, Kafon, GGA, Klay BBJ, K2 Rhym, Master Sina, Mohamed Amine Hamzaoui, Psyco-M, Bendir Man, Si Lemhaf, Artmasta.

The most famous electronic and trip hop singers are Emel Mathlouthi, Ghalia Benali.

The most famous opera singer is Hassen Doss.

There are a number of metal bands including Myrath, Persona, Cartagena and Nawather who all play Oriental Metal.

== See also ==
- Arabic music
- Arabic pop music
