= Tales of the Sands =

Studio album by Myrath
- Released: September 27, 2011
- Genre: Power metal Oriental metal Progressive metal
- Length: 45:09
- Label: XIII Bis Records (Europe); Nightmare Records (world)
- Producer: Kevin Codfert

Myrath chronology
Desert Call (2010)	Tales of the Sands (2011)	Legacy (2016)

Professional ratings
Review scores
Source	Rating
Hard Rock Haven	8.75/10
Metal Express Radio	8.5/10
Metal.de	7/10
Stormbringer	3.5/5

Tales of the Sands is the third studio album by Tunisian progressive power metal band Myrath, released on September 27, 2011 through XIII Bis Records in Europe and Nightmare Records worldwide. The album was produced by Adagio's keyboardist Kevin Codfert.

== Track listing ==
No.	Title	Length
1.	"Under Siege"	4:28
2.	"Braving the Seas"	4:20
3.	"Merciless Times"	3:28
4.	"Tales of the Sands"	5:19
5.	"Sour Sigh"	4:58
6.	"Dawn Within"	3:31
7.	"Wide Shut"	5:25
8.	"Requiem for a Goodbye"	4:23
9.	"Beyond the Stars"	5:15
10.	"Time to Grow"	4:02

Bonus Tracks
No.	Title	Length
1.	"Apostrophe for a Legend" (U.S. bonus track)	5:10
2.	"Fate in Motion" (Japanese bonus track)	4:49

== Personnel ==
- Malek Ben Arbia - guitars
- Zaher Zorgati - lead & backing vocals
- Anis Jouini - bass
- Elyes Bouchoucha - keyboards, backing vocals, violin orchestra director
- Piwee Desfray - drums

=== Guest musicians ===
- Ayman El Guedri - head of violin section, violin solo and alto
- Yassine Ben Miloud - violin
- Anouar Jaaiem - violin
- Clémentine Delauney - guest vocal on "Under Siege"

=== Production ===
- Kevin Codfert - producer, mixing, recording, engineer, arrangements
- Fredrik Nordström - mixing
- Jens Bogren - mastering
- Taher Guizani - string section recording
- Elyes Bouchoucha - arrangements
- Bader Klidi - artwork
- Perrine Pérez Fuentes - booklet art and direction
- Ludovic Cordelieres - artwork and design
- Ayoub Hidri - logo design
- Martha Vergeot - logo design
