= Sriti =

Sriti may refer to:

- Ali Sriti (1919-2007), Tunisian oudist, composer, and music teacher
- Sriti Jha (born 1986), Indian actress

== See also ==
- Smriti, a category of Hindu texts
- Shriti Vadera, Baroness Vadera, British-Indian banker
