= Triki (surname) =

Triki is a surname. Notable people with this surname include:

- Ali Treki (1937–2015), aka Ali Triki, Libyan diplomat
- Karim Bibi Triki (born 1968), Algerian politician and electronic engineer
- Mohamed Ben Ali Triki (born 1931), Tunisian scout leader
- Montassar Triki (born 2001), Tunisian footballer
- Rachida Triki (born 1949), Tunisian fine art scholar
- Smahi Triki (born 1967), Moroccan footballer
- Yasser Triki (born 1997), Algerian long and triple jumper
- Zineb Triki (born 1980), French-Moroccan actor
