= Desert Call =

Studio album by Myrath
- Released: January 25, 2010
- Recorded: November 2009
- Studio: Tunis, Tunisia
- Genre: Oriental metal Progressive rock Progressive metal Power metal
- Length: 65:03
- Label: XIII Bis Records (Europe); Nightmare Records (world)
- Producer: Kevin Codfert

Myrath chronology
Hope (2007)	Desert Call (2010)	Tales of the Sands (2011)

Professional ratings
Review scores
Source	Rating
Aux Portes Du Metal	18/20
Metal.de	6/10
Rock Eyez	4/5
Stormbringer	4.5/5

Desert Call is the second studio album by Tunisian progressive metal band Myrath, released on January 25, 2010, through XIII Bis Records in Europe and Nightmare Records worldwide. The album was produced by Adagio's keyboardist Kevin Codfert.

== Track listing ==
No.	Title	Length
1.	"Forever and a Day"	5:40
2.	"Tempests of Sorrows"	4:42
3.	"Desert Call"	7:00
4.	"Madness"	6:18
5.	"Silent Cries"	10:45
6.	"Memories"	4:53
7.	"Ironic Destiny"	5:44
8.	"No Turning Back"	5:38
9.	"Empty World"	7:06
10.	"Shockwave"	7:15
Total length:		65:03

North American Bonus Track
No.	Title	Length
11.	"Hard Times"	8:02

== Personnel ==
- Malek Ben Arbia - guitars
- Zaher Zorgati - vocals
- Anis Jouini - bass
- Elyes Bouchoucha - keyboards, backing vocals
- Saif Louhibi - drums

== Release history ==
Region	Date	Label	Format	Catalog #
Europe	January 25, 2010	XIII Bis Records	Compact disc	
Worldwide	January 26, 2010	Nightmare Records	Compact disc	NMR-542
