= Tunisian ma'luf =

Music genre of Tunisia

The Tunisian ma'luf, also spelled Tunisian malouf, is one of the principal types of traditional music in Tunisia, and a branch of Andalusi classical music. It was influenced in a historical process by the cultural substrate specific to the region of Ifriqiya (the ancient name of the region) and musical influence from Al-Andalus, Middle Eastern, African and Mediterranean musical traditions.

== History ==
In the 8th century, Kairouan, capital of the Aghlabids and the country's first religious city, cultivated a musical art comparable to that flourishing in Baghdad. Its influence extended to Fez, Morocco via Béjaïa, Constantine, and Tlemcen in Algeria. This is why the illustrious musician Ziryab, who had been exiled from Baghdad, made a long stop in Kairouan on his westward journey before settling in Córdoba in Al-Andalus, where he founded the first school of Andalusian classical music.

In the 13th century, under the Hafsid dynasty, around 8000 Muslim and Jewish Andalusians were expelled by the advancing Christians during the Reconquista. Having arrived in Tunis, they brought with them a musical repertoire rooted in the tradition of Al-Andalus. The styles and repertoires introduced by Andalusian immigrants quickly came under local influence and changed through contact with the native population. Tunisia, which became a province of the Ottoman Empire in 1574, was influenced by Turkish culture. The ma'luf integrated musical forms from the Middle Eastern traditions in Istanbul, Aleppo, Damascus, and Cairo.

Ma'luf occupies a special place in Tunisia's musical tradition as an important part of the cultural heritage. The genre includes both a secular (hazl) and a religious repertoire (jadd), traditionally tied to the music of various Sufi brotherhoods. It covers several forms of classical traditional song: the muwashshah, the zajal, shghul, foundou, and the bashraf. The central form of the ma'luf is the nūba, originally meaning a session of music, now comparable to a musical suite.

== Nūba, the core form of Tunisian ma'luf ==
According to al-Tifāshī al-Gafsī (13th century), the nūba formerly consisted of the following pieces: nashīd (recitative), istihlāl (overture), ʿamal (song in a heavy rhythm), muḥarrak (song in a light rhythm), the muwashshah, and the zajal. According to Shaykh Muḥammad al-Dharīf (14th century), nūbas once followed fourteen different musical modes: rahāwī, dhīl, ʿIrāq, sīkāh, ḥsīn, rasd, raml al-māyā, nawā, asbaʿayn, rasd al-dhīl, rmal, asbahān, mazmūm and māya. Muhammad Rachid Bey—a Bey of Tunis, music lover, oud player and violinist—is credited with revising and establishing the repertoire of Tunisian nūbas: he arranged the various parts and added Turkish-inspired instrumental pieces. He is also credited with composing most of the nūba's instrumental pieces, namely the overtures (istiftāḥ and msaddar) and the interludes (tūshiya and fārigha). Thirteen nūbas were thus compiled in thirteen of the modes mentioned above (except the rahāwī nūba, which oral tradition failed to transmit to the present day).

Today, the nūba is a musical composition built on a principal mode from which it takes its name, and formed as a sequence of vocal and instrumental pieces performed in an agreed order. The structure of the Tunisian nūba highlights contrasts and symmetries between its parts and within each: the first part favors duple meters, the second, triple meters; each part begins with slow rhythms and ends with lively ones; the alternation of slow and lively rhythms can also recur within the pieces themselves.

Performance by the Rachidia orchestra, 2009

Nūbas draw on poetic forms of the classical genre (qaṣīda) or post-classical (muwashshah and zajal). The abyāt that open the sung part of the nūba, generally two in number, are in Classical Arabic. Other sung parts are in Tunisian, in Classical Arabic, or a combination of both. Favorite themes include love, nature, and wine, as well as other worldly topics. Some khatm (closing sections) treat religious subjects, promoting piety and imploring divine mercy. Most nūba texts are anonymous.

Nūbas are usually performed by small ensembles featuring string instruments, chiefly the Tunisian ʿūd—distinct from the Eastern lute by its longer shape and number of strings—the rbāb (also called rebab, Maghrebi rebab or rebec) with two gut strings on a monoxyle soundbox, the violin (introduced as early as the), and the qānūn. Orchestras also include a wind instrument, the ney, and percussion: nagharet (or naqaret), the tar, and more recently the darbouka. Small ensembles tend to give way to larger orchestras with around fifteen instrumentalists and about ten choristers. The use of European string instruments alongside traditional ones—and the adoption of notation, necessary for large ensembles—has given ma'luf performance a new spirit and dimension.

As a centerpiece of traditional heritage, nūbas are still performed at public concerts and family celebrations, especially in urban settings. Towns with Andalusian refugee communities (such as Testour or Soliman) maintain this tradition. Today, the nūba is experiencing a revival among Tunisian diaspora communities in France and Italy, who value reviving endangered instruments and see it as a way to reconnect with their cultural identity of origin.

== Other traditional forms ==
The muwashshah is a post-classical form that departs from the rigid frame of the classical qaṣīda. It features a fixed poetic structure with varied rhymes, often in multiple stanzas, traced to 10th-century Al-Andalus. In Tunisian ma'luf, the musical form is marked by renewed metrical patterns. Considered the summit of Maghrebi and Arabic poetic expression by Ibn Khaldun, the muwashshah is distinguished by its specific structure. Famous examples include Badri badā and Aṭalta al-hajr. The zajal is a form traditionally sung in Tunisian Arabic. A strophic structure and frequent use of internal rhymes characterize it. Themes vary, from love and nature to inebriation, nostalgia for al-Andalus, and even philosophical topics. Examples include Āh ʿalā mā fāt and Dīr al-mudām fī al-kās. Rhythm may be free or follow specific metrical patterns, adding to its expressive diversity. In ma'luf, the zajal is crucial for showcasing vocal virtuosity and poetic creativity.

Shghul is marked by a distinctive, elaborate rhythmic and melodic style. Literally meaning "work" or "well-crafted workmanship", it reflects the care given to its melodic and rhythmic construction. Noted pieces include Yā lā qawmī ḍayyaʿūnī and Rifqan malīka al-ḥusn. This sung form features modal and rhythmic variations, including odd meters such as 5/8 or 7/8. Shghul is rich in ornamentation and innovation, while remaining close to the nūba's noble style. Musicians such as Ahmed el-Wafi and Khemaïs Tarnane innovated in this form, opening Tunisian ma'luf to outside influences while staying faithful to Tunisian musical synthesis.

Foundou denotes a form known for depth and authenticity (from Italian fondo, "deep"). It typically uses a verse–chorus structure with adwār (verses) and a radda (refrain), and draws on a variety of rhythms such as mdawwar ḥawzī or btayḥī. Using Tunisian, foundou helped bring ma'luf to a broader audience. Well-known examples include Shūshāna and Nammayt namm al-mkhalīl, which testify to the integration of classical and popular Tunisian traditions. Although songs like Yā khīl Sālem or Frāg Ghezālī are popular foundou pieces, musicologists generally do not classify them within Tunisian ma'luf; however, as with ma'luf foundou, performances often conclude with one or more ma'luf items—typically a barwēl or a khatm.

The bashraf is a piece characterized by non-measured (free) rhythm and strict unison performance. Though of Ottoman origin, the Tunisian version incorporates instruments tuned in a typically Tunisian manner and remains anchored in the Andalusian genre. Unlike the Eastern peşrev, which is built on long rhythmic cycles, the Tunisian bashraf generally uses shorter cycles and is composed of two principal parts separated by improvisations of the istikhbār or taqsīm type. The first part, badaniyya, comprises phrases of unequal length, while the second, ḥarbī, is played at a faster tempo. Although inspired by its Ottoman ancestor, the Tunisian bashraf has evolved with distinct features suited to ma'luf, notably through variations introduced by oral transmission. A typical example is Bashraf nawā.

== Discography ==
- Congrès du Caire 1932: Malouf tunisien. Mohamed Ben Hassan & Mohamed Cherif. Les Artistes Arabes Associés, 1994
- Tunisia. Nûba al-Dhîl. Anthology of mâlûf, vol. 1, Orchestre et chorale de la Radio Tunisienne, INEDIT, Maison des Cultures du Monde, 1991
- Tunisia. Nuba al-Ramal. Anthology of mâlûf, vol. 2, INEDIT, Maison des Cultures du Monde, 1992
- Tunisia. Nuba al-Asbahan. Anthology of mâlûf, vol. 3, INEDIT, Maison des Cultures du Monde, 1993
- Tunisia. Nuba al-'Iraq. Anthology of mâlûf, vol. 4, INEDIT, Maison des Cultures du Monde, 2004
- Tunisia. Nuba al-Sîka. Ensemble de musique traditionnelle de Tunis. INEDIT, Maison des Cultures du Monde, 1994

== See also ==
- Music of Tunisia
- The Rachidia
