= Lotfi Bouchnak =

Tunisian singer, oudist and composer

Lotfi Bouchnak لطفي بوشناق
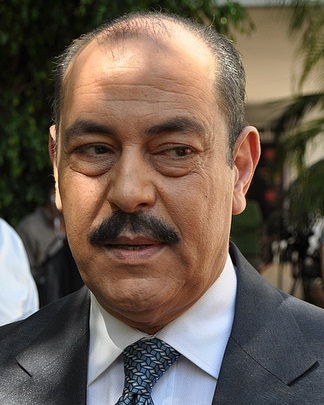
- Bouchnak in 2013

Background information
- Born: January 18, 1954 (age 72); Tunis, Tunisia
- Occupations: Singer, composer, musician
- Instrument: Oud

Lotfi Bouchnak (Tunisian Arabic: لطفي بوشناق; born January 18, 1954) is a Tunisian singer, oud player, composer and public figure. He is considered one of the best tenors in the Arab world and has been dubbed as Tunisia's "Pavarotti". He also played in Tunisian TV series and movies including Maktoub, La boîte magique, Halou u mer and El paraíso ya no es lo que era.

== Biography ==
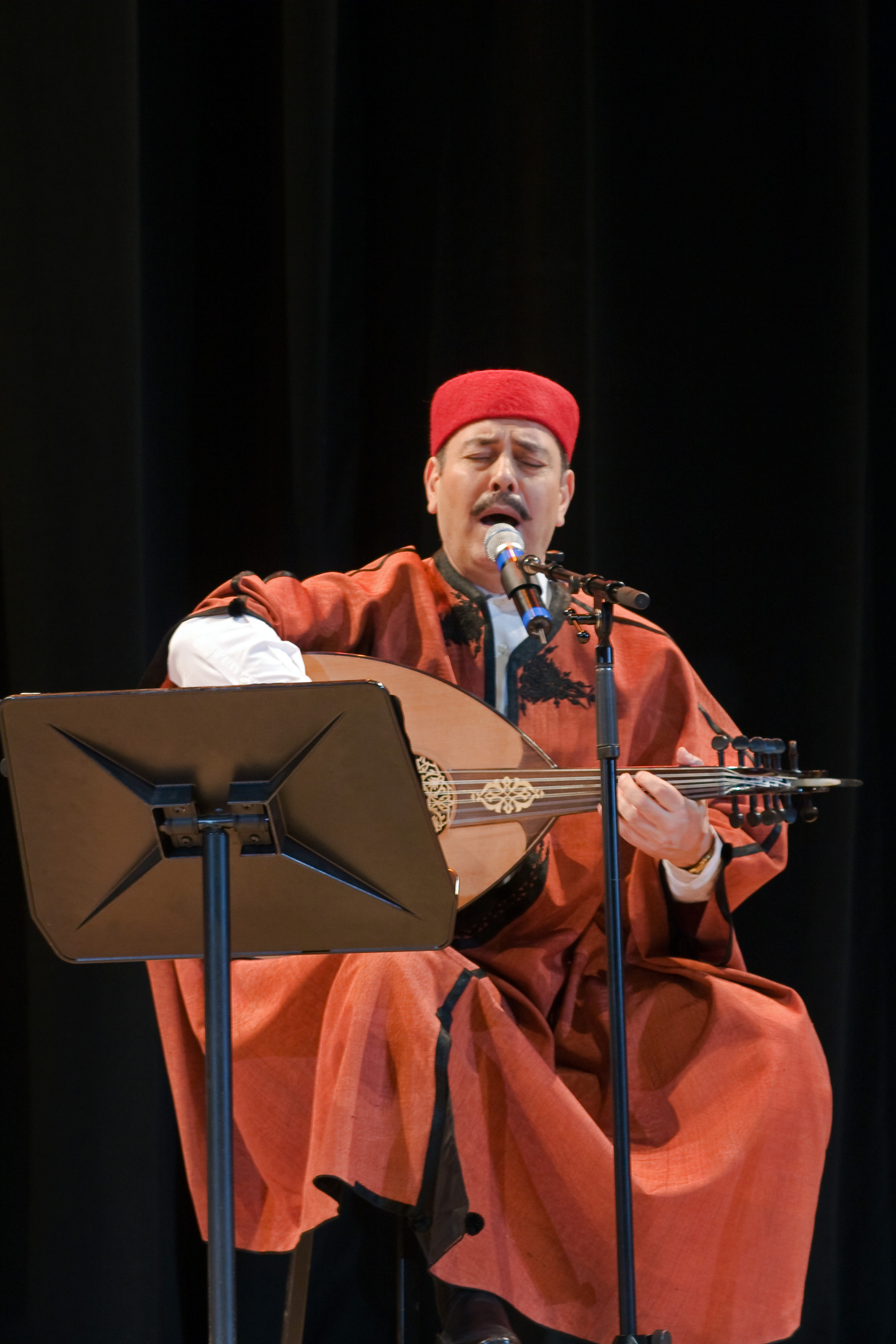
Lotfi Bouchnak on stage

Bouchnak was born in Tunis, Tunisia to a family of Bosniak and Turkish origin. At a young age, he began re-performing the songs of Oum Kalthoum and other masters of Egyptian music. He joined the "Youth Musical Group of Tunis", then "Arrachidia", where he started improving his vocal skills with Ali Sriti. He also learnt to play the Oud. In 1979, at the age of 25, Bouchnak recorded his first song composed by Ahmed Siddiqui. He then started working with other famous composers such as Sayed Mekkaoui, Fathallah Ahmed, and Anwar Brahem. In the 1980s, he started composing songs for other artists such as Khaled and the rap group IAM. Bouchnak has been one of few artists to have regular shows in the Cairo Opera House since 1992. He won the Best Arab Singer Award in Washington, D.C., in 1997.

In 2019 he collaborates with the Tunisian heavy metal band Myrath on the song "Mersal" (from their album Shehili) and with the Italian artist Tosca in her album Morabeza.

== Honours and awards ==
=== Honours ===
- Grand Officier of the National Order of Merit of Tunisia
- Grand Officier of the Order of the Seventh of November of Tunisia
- Grand Star of the Order of Culture, Science and Arts of Palestine

=== Awards ===
- Prize of Khedivial Opera House
- Gold Medal of Institut du Monde Arabe
- Gold Medal of the Arab League Educational, Cultural and Scientific Organization
- Gold Medal of National Festival of Popular Arts of Marrakesh
- Medal of the City of Sarajevo
