= Wilderness of Mirrors (Myrath album) =

Studio album by Myrath
- Released: 27 March 2026
- Genre: Progressive metal, power metal
- Length: 46:56
- Label: earMUSIC
- Producer: Kevin Codfert

Myrath chronology
Karma (2024)	Wilderness of Mirrors (2026)

Singles from Wilderness of Mirrors
- 1. "Until the End" Released: 4 November 2025; 2. "The Funeral" Released: 17 December 2025; 3. "Soul of My Soul" Released: 5 February 2026; 4. "Breathing Near the Roar" Released: 1 March 2026

Professional ratings
Review scores
Source	Rating
Chaoszine	4.5/5 stars
Metal.de	7/10
Rock Hard	8/10

Wilderness of Mirrors is the seventh studio album by Tunisian progressive metal band Myrath, released on 27 March 2026. Music videos/singles were released for some songs including "Until the End" (featuring Amaranthe female vocalist Elize Ryd), "The Funeral", and "Soul of My Soul".

== Track listing ==
All lyrics are written by Kevin Codfert and Zaher Zorgati, except "Still the Dawn Will Come" (lyrics by Codfert, Zorgati, and Martin Pagaard Wolff) and "Echoes of the Fallen" (lyrics by Malek Ben Arbia); all music is composed by Myrath, except "Edge of the Night" (composed by Myrath and Radhi Chaouali).

Wilderness of Mirrors track listing
No.	Title	Length
1.	"The Funeral"	5:36
2.	"Until the End" (featuring Elize Ryd)	4:07
3.	"Breathing Near the Roar"	3:34
4.	"Les Enfants du Soleil"	6:03
5.	"Still the Dawn Will Come"	5:01
6.	"The Clown"	4:46
7.	"Soul of My Soul"	3:38
8.	"Edge of the Night"	4:21
9.	"Echoes of the Fallen"	4:02
10.	"Through the Seasons"	5:48
Total length:		46:56

== Personnel ==
Credits adapted from the album's liner notes.

=== Myrath ===
- Zaher Zorgati – lead vocals, backing vocals
- Malek Ben Arbia – guitars
- Kevin Codfert – keyboards, backing vocals, arrangements, recording, engineering, production
- Anis Jouini – bass
- Morgan Berthet – drums

=== Additional contributors ===
- Charly Sahona – extra guitars, acoustic guitars
- Cheikh Diallo – extra backing vocals
- Radhi Chaouali – extra violins, qraqeb, arrangements on "Edge of the Night"
- Nicolas Marco – choir direction
- Glanum Rock School students – choir vocals on "Les Enfants du Soleil"
- Frank Serafine – choir vocals on "Soul of My Soul"
- Wassin Bibi – choir vocals on "Soul of My Soul"
- Galya Nikolaeva – choir vocals on "Soul of My Soul"
- Myrath Orchestra – violins, altos
- Fehmi Mbarki – saz
- Jacob Hansen – drum recording, vocal recording, mixing, mastering
- Perrine Perez Fuentes – photo credits
- Chiyoko Asahi – front cover artwork
- Caio Caldas – packaging, booklet artworks, design

== Charts ==
Chart performance for Wilderness of Mirrors
Chart (2026)	Peak position
French Physical Albums (SNEP)	41
French Rock & Metal Albums (SNEP)	8
