= Azmour =

Azmour أزمور
- Commune and town
- Location in Tunisia
- Coordinates: 36°55′28″N 11°00′25″E
- Country: Tunisia
- Governorate: Nabeul Governorate

Population (2014)
  - Total: 5,054
- Time zone: UTC1 (CET)
- Postal code: 8035

Azmour is a small town and commune in the Nabeul Governorate, located in the Cape Bon peninsula of Tunisia, bounded to the north by El Haouaria, to the south by Kélibia, east by Hammam Ghezèze and west by Menzel Temime.

The commune was created by Decree No. 640 on April 23, 1985, with 4,500 acres (18 km^{2}). As of 2004 it had 5,001 inhabitants.

Azmour hosted the Festival of Sidi Maaouia Echêref from 5 to 7 August 2003.

== Notable people ==
- Naama (singer)
