= Ali Sriti =

Ali Sriti (علي السّريتي) (b. 1919 in Tunis–d. 5 April 2007) was a Tunisian oudist, composer, and music teacher.

== Biography ==
He learned music at a young age from his father, who encouraged him to listen to classical Arabic music including Egyptians Sayed Darwich, Mohammed Abdel Wahab, Riadh Sombati, and Zakaria Ahmed.

Sriti was influenced by the Turkish school of lutism and learned how to create and play a form of the lute, the oud, from Sheikh Abdelaziz Jemail. His first public performance was at age 11, when he sang Ya chiraan waraa dajla yajri by Mohamed Abdel Wahab. In 1935, he joined the musical association, The Rachidia, while the next year Sriti became a member of Mohamed Triki. In 1937, Sriti became a part of the Syrian band Ali Derwiche where he learned about muwashshahs and various Arab and Turkish compositions.

After returning from Paris, where he attended concerts held at the Grande Mosquée de Paris, Sriti created the band Chabeb El Fan and worked with artists such as Kaddour Srarfi, Ibrahim Salah, and Salah El Mahdi. He directed, in 1957, three new bands to work for the national radio station. While serving as a long-time worker on the radio, he taught at the Conservatoire national de musique, though he quit in 1980 to focus solely on teaching. Among his students were Anouar Brahem and Lotfi Bouchnak.

Ali Sriti was given the Prix national de la musique en 1987 and the Grand Cordon de l'Ordre du mérite national en 1999. He died on April 5, 2007, at the age of 88.
