= JenJoon =

Tunisian rapper (born 1992)

Omar Twihri (JenJoon)
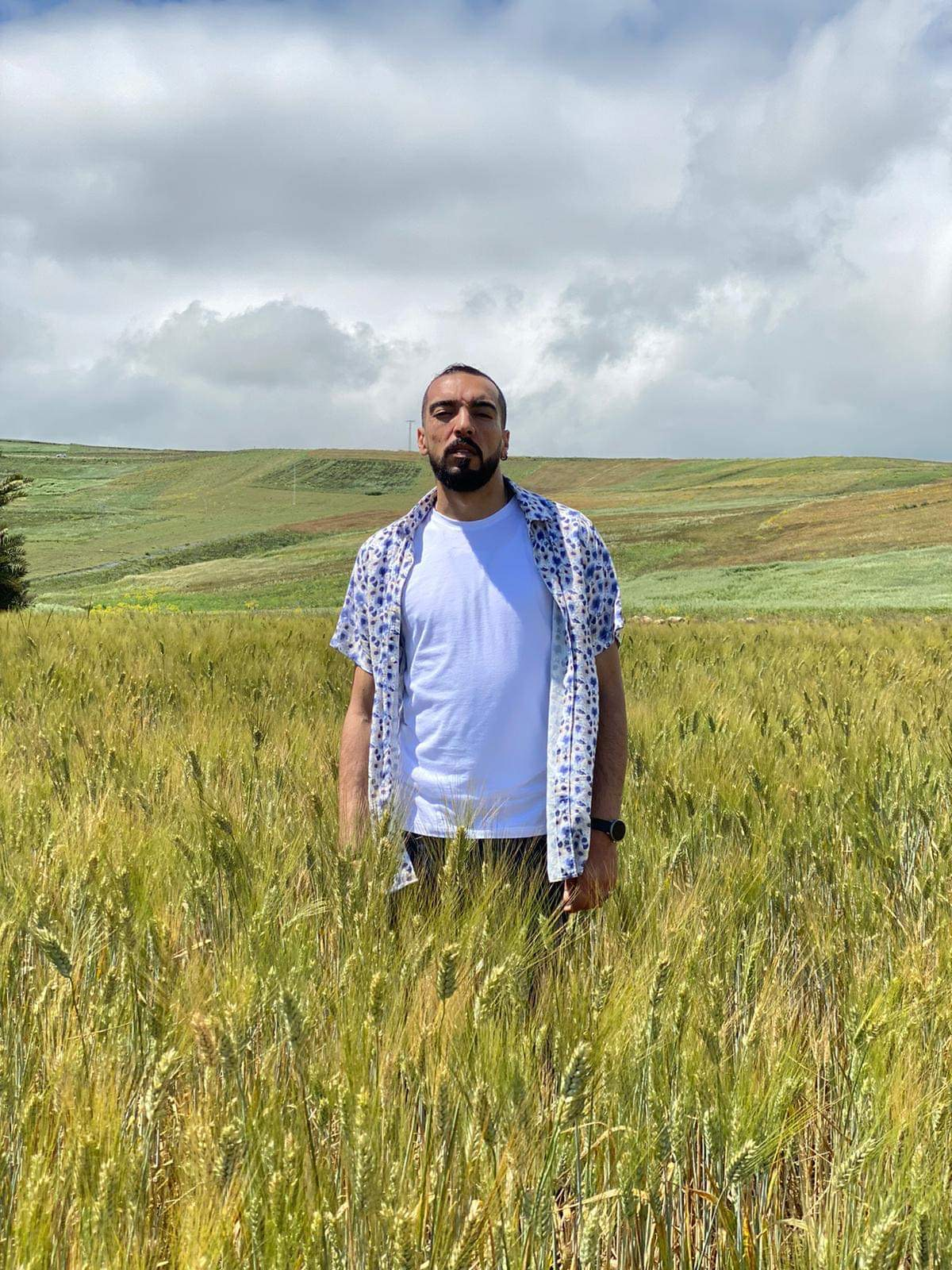
- Omar Twihri in 2021

Background information
- Born: Omar Twihri; 22 September 1991 (age 34)
- Origin: Tunisia
- Genres: Pop; rap
- Occupation: Musician
- Years active: 2005–present

Omar Twihri (Known As JenJoon; born on 09 September 1991, in Jendouba), is a Tunisian musician, specializing in rap and pop music which is widely known in Tunisia as Tunisian underground music.

== Career ==
Omar Twihri started his musical career at a young age after he dropped out of school due to financial issues in 2005. Later, he named himself JenJoon, which means the little jinn. JenJoon, as he named himself, faced a lot of issues, such as a lack of money, no studios available where he lives in the northwest of Tunisia. In 2018, Twihri moved to Tunis the capital. At first, he worked in a bar to save money so he could start recording his music. Then, he met many famous people; some were racist toward him, others encouraged him, which made him determined to succeed. Now, JenJoon is one of the top-listed musicians in the Tunisian music industry. With over 1 million subscribers on YouTube, his content has over 104 million total views since 2012, he made his dream come true.

== Discography ==
=== 2014 ===
Year	Singles
2014	JenJoon & Amon – Tounes Fi Lamen

=== 2017 ===
Year	Singles
2017	JenJoon – La Teli; JenJoon – Maadhour; JenJoon – Henya

=== 2018 ===
Year	Singles
2018	JenJoon & Mahri – Ellil

=== 2019 ===
Year	Singles
2019	JenJoon – Fly Me to the Moon; JenJoon – Omniyet; JenJoon – Dahr; JenJoon – Parasite

=== 2020 ===
Year	Singles
2020	JenJoon – HAYALA; JenJoon ft 4LFA – Shweraa Tafia; JenJoon – Barrani; JenJoon – Belekchi Na Elghalet

=== 2021 ===
Year	Singles
2021	RedStar – Ech Mazel Feat JenJoon; Mehdi Mouelhi feat JenJoon-El Foundou
