= Karma (Myrath album) =

Studio album by Myrath
- Released: March 8, 2024
- Genre: Progressive metal, power metal, symphonic metal
- Length: 47:38
- Label: earMUSIC
- Producer: Kevin Codfert

Myrath chronology
Shehili (2019)	Karma (2024)	Wilderness of Mirrors (2026)

Singles from Karma
- 1. "Heroes" Released: 6 October 2023; 2. "Child of Prophecy" Released: 18 November 2023; 3. "Into the Light" Released: 20 January 2024; 4. "Candles Cry" Released: 23 February 2024

Professional ratings
Review scores
Source	Rating
Aux Portes Du Metal	14/20
Metal.de	8/10
Stormbringer	5/5

Karma is the sixth studio album by Tunisian progressive metal band Myrath, released on 8 March 2024 (originally scheduled for February). It is their first album without longtime keyboardist Elyes Bouchoucha, who left the band in 2020, though his departure would not come to light until 2022 due to the COVID-19 pandemic. As a result, session member Kévin Codfert (formerly of the band Adagio) joined Myrath full-time. Music videos/singles were released for some songs including "Into the Light" and "Candles Cry".

== Track listing ==
Karma track listing
No.	Title	Length
1.	"To the Stars"	3:58
2.	"Into the Light"	4:52
3.	"Candles Cry"	4:07
4.	"Let It Go"	4:25
5.	"Words Are Failing"	4:49
6.	"The Wheel of Time"	4:19
7.	"Temple Walls"	3:32
8.	"Child of Prophecy"	4:27
9.	"The Empire"	4:29
10.	"Heroes"	4:12
11.	"Carry On"	4:28
Total length:		47:38

== Personnel ==
- Zaher Zorgati – lead vocals
- Malek Ben Arbia – guitars
- Anis Jouini – bass
- Kévin Codfert – keyboards, piano, karkabou, backing vocals
- Morgan Berthet – drums
