= Elmer Food Beat =

French rock band

Elmer Food Beat is a rock group from Nantes, France, formed in 1986. Their work is known for its raunchy lyrics. They were the 1991 Group of the Year for the Victoires de la Musique awards. They also co-created the annual Nantes music festival Les Rockeurs ont du cœur with their first manager, Stéphane Cluzeau.

== Members ==
- Twistos – guitar, vocals
- Manou – vocals
- Grand Lolo – guitar, vocals (replaced Kelu in 2002)
- Vincent – drums
- Kalou – bass guitar

== Discography ==
- Elmer Food Beat (Maxi 45T, 1988)
- 30 cm (1990)
- Je vais encore dormir seul ce soir (XIII Bis, 1991)
- La vie n'est pas une opérette (XIII Bis, 1992)
- La Copulation (XIII Bis, 1994)
- Heureux sur scène (1997)
- Gold (1998)
- Ze disque: 30 cm et plus (XIII Bis, 2000)
- L'essentiel (2000)
- Ze Best Of (2002) – CD+DVD
- 25 cm (2010) – 6-CD
- Merci les filles (XIII Bis, 2012)
- Les Rois du Bord de Mer (2013)
