= Shehili =

Studio album by Myrath
- Released: March 3, 2019
- Genre: Progressive metal, oriental metal, Arabic music
- Length: 47:26
- Label: earMUSIC
- Producer: Kevin Codfert, Eike Freese, Jens Bogren

Myrath chronology
Legacy (2016)	Shehili (2019)	Karma (2024)

Shehili is the fifth studio album by Tunisian progressive metal band Myrath, released on 3 March 2019. The group began to work on it in early 2017 and originally planned to release it later that year.

Myrath was already thinking of the album as they prepared its predecessor, Legacy. According to them, songs from both efforts are connected, as are each of their main singles ("Believer" and "Dance", respectively).

== Background, songwriting and production ==
After they finished touring for Legacy in 2017, members started to record ideas on their phones and later gathered for two weeks in a hotel room in Paris to discuss their compositions. After two weeks, producer Kevin Codfert finished orchestrations, arrangements and mixing and the final result was presented to Myrath's boss at earMUSIC, who praised everything but the drums. The latter were re-recorded in a studio in Hamburg with Eike Freese as a producer.

In an interview for Japanese news portal Barks, Codfert said the songs were written and then re-arranged for heavy metal instead of being written as metal songs since the beginning, which was a previously unused method by the band.

Around the time of the album's release, vocalist Zaher Zorgati said he wasn't "100% satisfied" with the result and that he felt it could be better musically speaking, and that the band could have included more songs. On the other hand, he did consider it "by far" their best album "in terms of maturity, production and sound".

=== Title and cover ===
"Shehili" is the warm, dry wind that blows across the deserts of Tunisia from the South, which is more commonly known as sirocco. The band believes it works as a metaphor for their sound.

The cover features elements of oriental architecture, referencing "the beauty of the country" and its "multi-faceted culture"; and an eye representing "defense against the evil eye and bad luck" and "blessings, power and strength".

== Song information ==
"Born to Survive", which received a video premiered on Loudwire, sees the band adopting tribal and guttural vocals. "Dance" tells the story of a Syrian dancer (Ahmad Joudeh) who maintains his activities even after receiving death threats from ISIS. The track is dedicated to "those who refuse to fall or to stop hoping, even in a world full of hatred and uncertainty". Joudeh has a tattoo on his neck which reads "Dance or Die", which inspired the originally planned title of the album, Dance of Death. "Dance" received a video and it is a continuation of Legacy's "Believer".

"Lili Twil" is a cover version of a 1970's Tunisian 'hit and "Mersal" features Tunisian-Bosnian singer Lotfi Bouchnak. The Japanese edition of the album includes a Japanese version of "Monster in My Closet".

== Reception ==
Professional ratings
Review scores
Source	Rating
Panorama	(favorable)
My Global Mind	9/10 stars
Metal Hammer (Germany)	5/7 stars

Writing for Panorama magazine, Michela Vecchia commented that the band managed to blend its oriental elements with progressive metal music reminiscent of Dream Theater and Symphony X.

Chris Martin from My Global Mind thought Shehili "feels more like the most logical progression from" Legacy and concluded by saying "Myrath continue to show themselves a [sic] one of the best bands going today in the Progressive Metal realm."

Writing for the German edition of Metal Hammer, Sebastian Kessler praised the band's "right balance" between melodic metal, progressive tendencies and Arabic elements and ultimately called Shehili "a gracefully orchestrated progressive metal album".

== Track listing ==
All tracks are written by Myrath

Shehili track listing
No.	Title	Length
1.	"Asl"	1:09
2.	"Born to Survive"	3:34
3.	"You've Lost Yourself"	4:52
4.	"Dance"	3:47
5.	"Wicked Dice"	4:11
6.	"Monster in My Closet"	4:49
7.	"Lili Twil"	3:46
8.	"No Holding Back"	4:42
9.	"Stardust"	4:01
10.	"Mersal" (featuring Lotfi Bouchnak)	3:43
11.	"Darkness Arise"	4:32
12.	"Shehili"	4:20
Total length:		47:26

Japanese edition bonus track
No.	Title	Length
13.	"Monster in My Closet (Japanese version)"	4:50

== Personnel ==
Per sources:

- Zaher Zorgati – lead vocals
- Malek Ben Arbia – guitars
- Anis Jouini – bass
- Elyes Bouchoucha – keyboards, backing vocals
- Morgan Berthet – drums
- Lotfi Bouchnak – co-lead vocals on "Mersal"

The album features other instruments such as the violin, the rebab, the bendir, the darbuka and the clarinet.
