= Kafon =

Tunisian rapper (1983–2025)

Kafon كافون
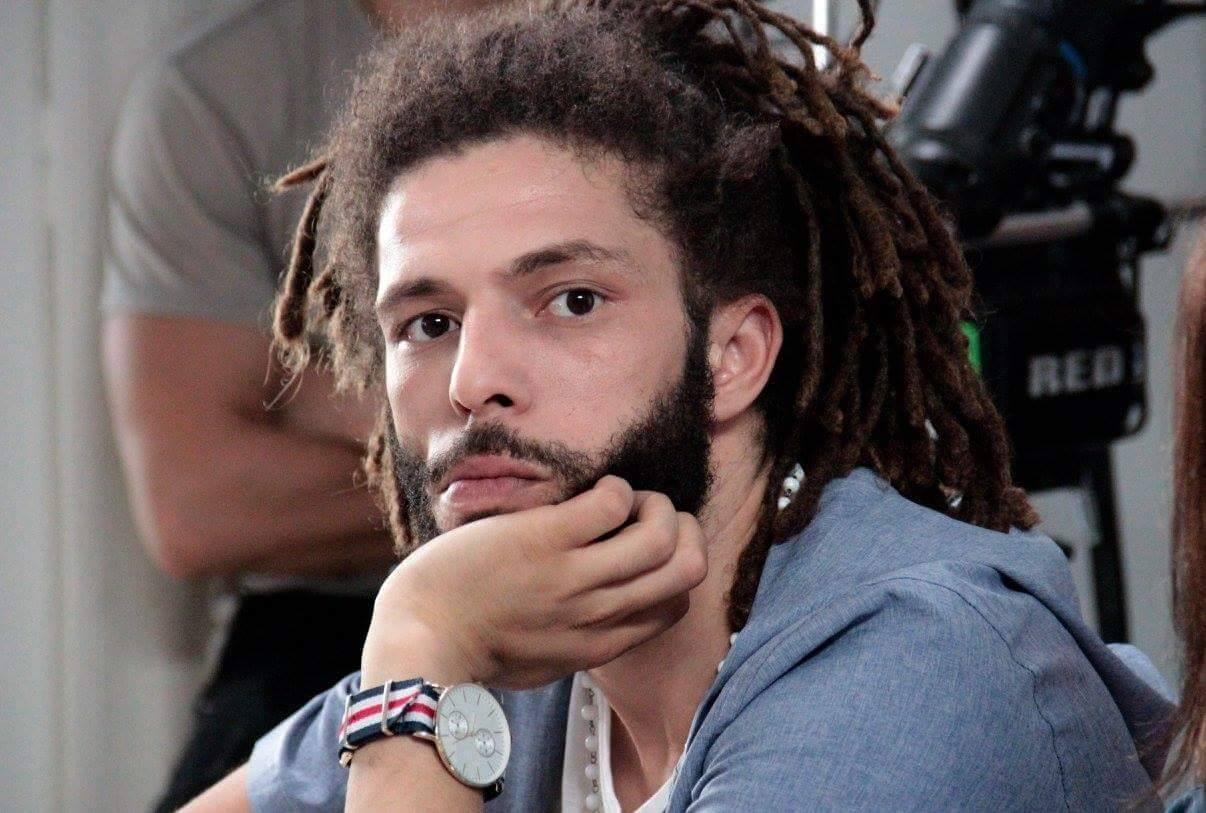
- Kafon in 2016

Background information
- Born: Ahmed Laabidi أحمد العبيدي; 1983; La Goulette, Tunisia
- Died: 10 May 2025 (aged 42) Tunis, Tunisia
- Genres: Hip-hop; reggae; pop
- Occupations: Rapper; singer; songwriter; actor
- Instrument: Vocals
- Years active: 2013–2025
- Spouse: Elhem Chihi (m. 2024)

Ahmed Laabidi (Arabic: أحمد العبيدي; 1983 – 10 May 2025), better known by his stage name Kafon (Arabic: كافون), was a Tunisian rapper, singer and actor. He gained widespread recognition in Tunisia after the release of the song "Houmani," which he performed alongside Mohamed Amine Hamzaoui.

== Early life and career ==
Laabidi was born in La Goulette, Tunis in 1983. He was originally from Sidi Abid, a locality in Bou Salem in the Jendouba Governorate. He grew up between La Goulette and Medina Jedida, two neighborhoods in the capital’s suburbs. He often described them as a central influence on his artistic identity, stating that rap served as “a personal diary for those who have been forgotten.” His artistic journey began at Espace Mass'Art, a cultural and artistic space in Tunis, where he met fellow rapper Mohamed Amine Hamzaoui. The venue played a key role in shaping his early musical direction. His work regularly addressed issues such as social marginalization, poverty, and the challenges faced by youth, becoming a representative of popular angst of the Tunisian underclass.

Kafon emerged as a key figure in the Tunisian rap scene in the early 2010s, known for his raw style and socially engaged lyrics. His breakout came with the release of “Houmani” in 2013, a track that portrayed life in marginalized neighborhoods and quickly gained viral success. The song amassed over 50 million views on YouTube and is widely regarded as one of the most influential Tunisian rap songs of the post-revolution period.

His music was marked by a distinctive flow and a direct, unfiltered approach. Rather than seeking commercial appeal, he focused on giving a voice to the realities of everyday life in working-class communities.

== Personal life ==
Laabidi was married twice. His first marriage took place in 2019 but ended after two months. His second wife was Elhem Chihi, a doctoral researcher in law, whom he married in 2024.

=== Illness and death ===
Laabidi had long suffered from a rare vascular condition that led to serious health complications. In 2017, he underwent surgery that resulted in the amputation of the lower part of his foot, including the heel, due to restricted blood flow caused by the narrowing of blood vessels. He later stated that tobacco use and drug consumption had significantly contributed to the deterioration of his condition by obstructing a blood vessel in his foot. He publicly denied rumors suggesting he had diabetes or cancer, affirming instead that his condition was not life-threatening at the time, although it prevented him from continuing his musical activities. In December 2018, his illness worsened, necessitating the amputation of his second leg.

Kafon died following a long illness on the morning of 10 May 2025, at the age of 42. According to reports, the cause of death was a heart attack. In the years preceding his death, his health had significantly declined, leading to his gradual withdrawal from the music scene.

Laabidi was buried at Jellaz Cemetery in Tunis.

== Discography ==
=== Albums ===
Solo

- Fifty Fifty (2017)
- Mahboula (2018)
- Nheb Ngualaa (2018)
- Dima Zehi (2019)
- Saher E Lil (2023)
- DOUR W TAHKI (2023)
- Layamme (2024)
- Akhtani (2024)
- Dubai (2024)
- Tahet Saytara (2024)

Collaborations

- Houmani (2013) (with Mohamed Amine Hamzaoui)
- Dynamite (2016) (with Balti)
- Amazone (2021) (with Didine Canon 16)
- Sahbi (2022) (with Blingos)

=== EPs ===
- Mazatil Balam (2014) (with Artmasta)
- Gabi Gabi (2015) (with G.G.A)

== Filmography ==
Year	Title	Role
2015	School S2	-
2016	WOH!	Sofiene
2019	Nouba (season 1)	Sangra
2019	Kesmat Wkhayen	Kafon
2021	Ken Ya Makanech	Hbaq
2024	Ragouj (season 1)	Bob
