= Checkpoint 303 =

Music collective

Checkpoint 303 is a non-profit musical collective from the emerging Arabic and Middle-Eastern underground electronica scene. The activist musical project was launched by Tunisian SC MoCha and Palestinian SC Yosh in 2004 and has secured an avant-garde position on the Arabic underground music scene (see also Tunisian underground music). The non-commercial aspect of this musical project is a fundamental dimension of the band's work since it allows for creative freedom and the liberty to express activist opinions. Checkpoint 303's compositions are inspired by the ongoing conflict in the Middle East and the suffering it causes to the civilian populations throughout the region.

== Origin ==
The name Checkpoint 303 was inspired by the Bethlehem Checkpoint 300, (one of numerous Israeli checkpoints restricting and controlling passage between the Palestinian self-controlled areas and Israel). A co-founding member of Checkpoint 303 lives and performs field recordings in Bethlehem.

== The music ==
CheckPoint 303's arrangements are grounded in electronica and experimental music with a touch of oriental tunes. The compositions are a blend of field recordings, audio samples, oud (the oriental luth) and keys embedded into loops of electronic beats ranging from downtempo, drum'n'bass to breakbeats and minimal techno. Several artists from around the world contribute to CheckPoint 303's compositions, these include Cheikh Julian, Ms K SuShi, MonaLisa, Noise Generator SoM, Melski and Damski.

== Discography and live performances ==
The collective's debut album Checkpoint Tunes was released by the end of 2007. However, the band also makes its compositions available via a Creative Commons License. Checkpoint 303 live performances also include DJ sets, for example as supporting act for Massive Attack in a series of benefit concerts that took place at the Carling Academy in the UK in February 2007.

== In the press ==
In December 2006 monthly newspaper Le Monde Diplomatique article cited Checkpoint 303 alongside other Palestinian artists such as Kamilya Jubran, Le Trio Joubran, and the Palestinian hip-hop act DAM. In April 2007, Checkpoint 303's music and activism was portrayed in an article published in the French newspaper Le Monde. In May 2007, Checkpoint 303 was also interviewed by Mag125 magazine.

=== Massive Attack opening act ===
In February 2007 UK newspaper The Independent reviewed the Massive Attack show in Birmingham and briefly commented on Checkpoint 303 opening act for the show, daily Canadian newspaper La Presse discusses its concept and music as well as its 2007 UK shows. Pro-Palestine organization Electronic Intifada also discussed the collective's performance there.

=== Radio ===
In April 2007, Checkpoint 303 was presented on a French radio show called Et pourtant ça tourne broadcast on France Inter.

Checkpoint 303 songs have been aired on numerous FM and online radio stations. To cite but a few examples: Checkpoint 303 was selected to represent Tunisian breakbeat music in a World Cup Special broadcast on The Joint on RDU-FM (RDU 98.5FM) a New Zealand student radio station. Checkpoint 303's music has also been aired on radio channels in various countries ranging from micro-broadcasting alternative stations in the US (e.g. The Peace Train 1610AM, in Arkansas), community stations throughout Europe (e.g. Radio Pimienta 100.3 FM, Tenerife, Canary Islands, or RCT 99.3 FM, Lyon, France), college radio stations (e.g. CHYZ 94.3 FM, Quebec, Canada) to private mainstream stations (e.g. Jawhara FM, Sousse, Tunisia).

=== Reviews and recommendations ===
Checkpoint 303's music was reviewed by unlikelystories.org and France Inter.

Checkpoint 303's music was selected by the websites of Channel 4 and British Airways as a suggested example of Tunisian Electronica.
