= Legacy (Myrath album) =

Studio album by Myrath
- Released: February 19, 2016
- Genre: Progressive metal, oriental metal, Arabic music
- Length: 50:43
- Label: Verycords (Europe); Nightmare (USA); Groove Master (MENA); King (Japan)
- Producer: Kevin Codfert

Myrath chronology
Tales of the Sands (2011)	Legacy (2016)	Shehili (2019)

Legacy is the fourth studio album by Tunisian progressive metal band Myrath, released on 19 February 2016. The name of the album is also the name of the band when translated to English.

As the band prepared it, they were already thinking of its successor Shehili. According to them, songs from both efforts are connected. It was originally planned for a 12 February release.

The song "Believer" was described as "an anthem for those who doubt, who are scared, who want to give up, who suffer." Following a crowdfunding campaign, the band spent € 45,000 to hire two Game of Thrones producers for the track's video. They initially wanted to create something that strayed from what they called Tunisian "clichés", but after receiving no replies from the local government with regards to authorization to shoot images in certain locations, they changed their concept.

== Reception ==
Professional ratings
Review scores
Source	Rating
Metal Hammer	4.5/5 stars
My Global Mind	10/10 stars

Metal Hammer's Dave Ling praised the blend of metal and oriental traditional elements, saying the addition of the latter does not "completely diminish the album's metal cred" and finished his review by saying Legacy "won't be for everyone, but adventurous souls will love it".

Chris Martin called Legacy "a brilliant spectacle morphing melodic progressive metal with stunning Arabic keyboard swaths and vocal melodies that hearken to the sounds of the Orient" in his review for My Global Mind. He also considered it their best album and a possible candidate for album of the year.

== Track listing ==
No.	Title	Length
1.	"Jasmin"	1:48
2.	"Believer"	4:32
3.	"Get Your Freedom Back"	3:57
4.	"Nobody's Lives"	5:43
5.	"The Needle"	5:06
6.	"Through Your Eyes"	5:37
7.	"The Unburnt"	4:36
8.	"I Want to Die"	4:39
9.	"Duat"	5:26
10.	"Endure the Silence"	4:44
11.	"Storm of Lies"	4:35
Total length:		50:43

American bonus track
No.	Title	Length
12.	"Other Side"	5:10
Total length:		55:53

Japanese bonus tracks
No.	Title	Length
12.	"Believer Karaoke"	4:32
13.	"Storm of Lies Karaoke"	4:35
Total length:		59:50

== Personnel ==
Per the band's official website:

=== Myrath ===
- Zaher Zorgati - lead and backing vocals
- Malek Ben Arbia - guitars
- Anis Jouini - bass
- Elyes Bouchoucha - keyboards, backing vocals, arrangements
- Morgan Bethet - drums

=== Guest musicians ===
- Bechir Gharbi, Riadh Ben Amor - violins
- Mohamed Gharbi, Hamza Obba - violins and alto
- Akrem Ben Romdhane - oud
- Koutaiba Rahali - gasba, ney
- Aurélien Joucla, Audrey Bedos - choirs

=== Technical personnel ===
- Kevin Codfert - producer, arrangements, recording and engineering (the latter two at X fade Studio)
- Fredrik Nordström - mixing
- Jens Bogren - mixing and mastering at Fascination Street Studios
- Perrine Prérez Fuentes - artwork and booklet
- Ayoub Hidri and Martha Vergeot - logo design
- Strings recorded at Studio Event
