= Chafia Rochdi =

Tunisian singer and actress

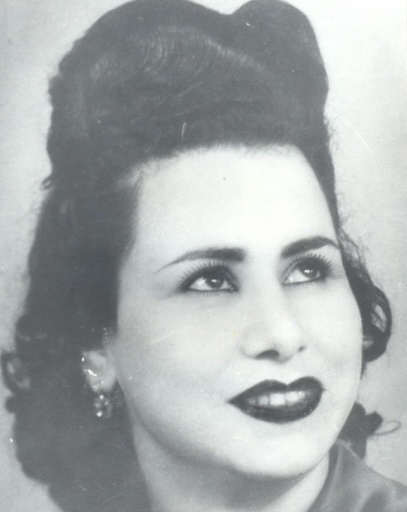

Background information
- Also known as: Nana
- Born: Zakia Bent Haj Boubaker Marrakchi; November 7, 1910
- Died: July 21, 1989 (aged 78)
- Genre: Tunisian
- Occupation: Singer-songwriter
- Instrument: Oud

Zakia Bent Haj Boubaker Marrakchi, better known by her stage names Chafia Rochdi and Nana (November 7, 1910 – July 21, 1989), was a Tunisian singer and actress.

== Biography ==
Born November 7, 1910, in Sfax as Zakia Bent Haj Boubaker Marrakchi, Rochdi's mother was of Turkish origin who spent her childhood in Tripoli. Orphaned as a child, she took her primary education in her hometown. At the age of 14, Rochdi learned to play the piano under the guidance of Hedi Chennoufi. She made her stage debut in 1920 under the leadership of Mohamed Chabchoub. Aspiring to gain public recognition, she travel to the capital of Tunis in 1929 where she joined the famous Tunisian artist Fadhila Khetmi in her first performances.

Named by her admirers as the "Diva of the Public" and "Nana", she was one of the few Tunisian artists to start her own theater company and the only woman to participate in the creation of The Rachidia alongside Mustapha Sfar. She also participated in various orchestras in the company of great musicians of the era and created her own band called the "Nana Orchestra."

In 2016, the Foundation Femmes et Memoire paid tribute to her and other women pioneers of Tunisian theater and song by celebrating 'Pioneers of Tunisia' day.

== Death ==
Towards the end of her life, Rochdi dedicated herself solely to acting in the theater. She died on July 21, 1989.
