= Tunisian underground music =

Tunisian underground music refers to music performed by Tunisian artists that play or compose in a style different from the established Tunisian mainstream (most notably classic Malouf or arab pop). Using the term underground to define a performing arts movement or scene in the Arab world, including Tunisia, takes on a slightly different meaning compared to the one generally understood when used in the western countries. Given that contemporary Tunisian mainstream music includes only a few different musical styles, underground music has come to include any artist or band that sings or composes in a different genre. For example, while there's nothing underground about reggae on the international stage, Tunisian reggae bands may still be considered part of the Tunisian underground scene. The underground music scene in Tunisia is growing fast, and in the past two decades there has been a considerable increase in the number of bands trying out all sorts of musical genres, moving the boundaries of what is considered underground.

== Heavy metal ==
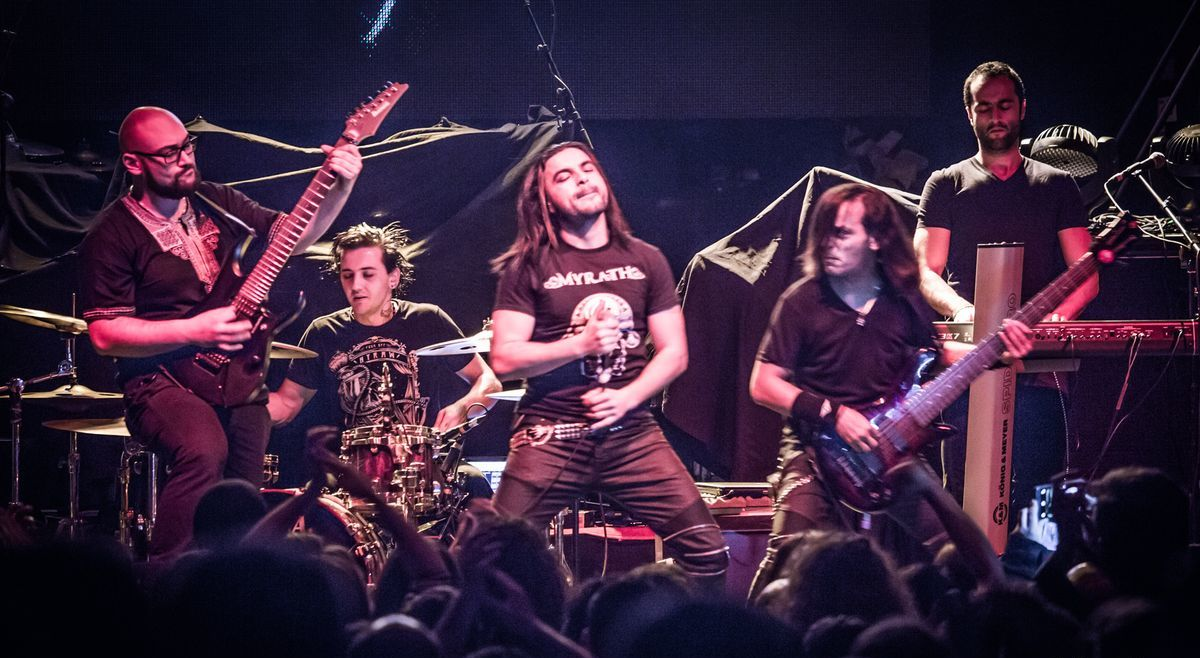
Metal band Myrath performing in Madrid, 2016

The most active scene is arguably that of Tunisian heavy metal bands, most notably Myrath, but also Persona, Nawather , Carthagods and Ymyrgar. Most of these bands sing in English and sometimes include Arabic sentences in the chorus of their songs. While several bands compose their own music, many of them perform covers.

== Rap ==
In contrast to Tunisian heavy metal bands, most Tunisian rappers perform in Tunisian (the local Arabic dialect). The Tunisian rap scene is widely based on self-producing MCs such as Wled Bled Crew (Balti...), T-man (Nizar...), Arab Clan (Karoura...), Warda Crew (Wistar), Zomra (El Castro, A.L.A, ZOUfree, Black T, Djappa Man, Bamboucha), Psyco-M, Vipa, Massi, Katybon, Klay BBJ, Hamzaoui Mohamed Amine, NASTYSH!!T, XIIVI, Wingz, Yung Vamp , Cheb Terro, Slim Larnaaout, AMYNE, WELD EL 15, Kamel Zmen, La Masse, BmG ,Samara, Joujma, Tchiggy, BadBoy 7low, JenJoon plus a growing number of music producers such as Dj Killer and Dj Momo.

== Electronic music ==
Electronic music was also popular in the scene, and many Tunisian DJs and producers are gained popularity in the international underground music scene.

The Tunisian Underground music scene also contains one of the first underground music labels in the country such as Logo Tunisia Records, M-DMC Records, Underground Source Records.

== See also ==
- Music of Tunisia
