= Psyco-M =

- Born: Mohamed Jandoubi; 10 July 1986 (age 39); Tunis, Tunisia
- Origin: Tunis
- Genres: Hip-hop
- Occupations: Rapper, Singer, Songwriter
- Years active: 1999–present
- Website: Official page

Mohamed Jandoubi (born July 10, 1986), better known by his stage name Psyco-M, is a Tunisian rapper and songwriter.

Psyco-M gained popularity in 2010, after his numerous conflicts with media. His message is based on Islamism.

== Songs ==
- A3tini El Kalash
- Anonyme
- Ardh AL Safiline
- Autopsy
- Barbare
- Bel We9fa
- Bi3 Lebled
- Black Hole
- Black Rose
- Complot
- Confession
- Contre
- Cyborg
- Dressage
- Fi l'enfer
- Ghost
- Hokuto Shinken
- Inside
- Je Me Souviens
- Jeu Politique
- La Guerre Psychologique
- Last Breath
- Lebled M3abya 5orm
- Les Jeunes Perdus
- Lettre
- Lucifer
- Ma Réponse
- Ma Tunisie 1
- Ma Tunisie 2
- Ma3ani
- Mafia Politique
- Manipulation
- Marionnette
- Mask
- Matricule
- Mc Dannous
- Mensonge
- Message 1 (Message Lik)
- Message 2
- Message 3
- Miroir – Chapitre 1 (Déséquilibre)
- Miroir – Chapitre 2 (Fusion)
- Mouwaten
- Necrophilia
- NUMB3RS
- Onizuka [GTO]
- Petrol
- Piranha
- Plume
- Psychokinésie
- Psychopathe
- Redemption
- Rules
- Slow Death
- Soldats (Danger Public)
- Solide
- Stress Post-Traumatique
- Thérapie de Choc 1
- Thérapie de Choc 2
- Tlassem
- Tsuki no me
- Yamma Je Te Demande Pardon
- Zlatan
- Zoophilia
- قرن الشيطان
- Psyco-M ft. Bilel RJ – Lebled Tha3et
- Psyco-M ft. Fami – Freestyle
- Psyco-M ft. Fami – Rap Overdose [Live]
- Psyco-M ft. Gadour – Espoire Perdu
- Psyco-M ft. Kenzi – Quoi qu'il arrive
- Psyco-M ft. Klay BBJ – Beb El Matar
- Psyco-M ft. Linko – Foutouna
- Psyco-M ft. Linko – Geleg
- Psyco-M ft. Linko – Glitch
- Psyco-M ft. Linko – Malla Mélla
- Psyco-M ft. Linko – Nhareb
- Psyco-M ft. Linko – Super Saiyan
- Psyco-M ft. Linko – Tfouh / Haters
- Psyco-M ft. Lotfi DK – Yji Nhar
- Psyco-M ft. Narco – Espoir Perdu 2
- Psyco-M ft. Narco – Honneur
- Psyco-M ft. Sadok Nordo – Back Again
