= Naâma (singer) =

Tunisian singer (1934–2020)

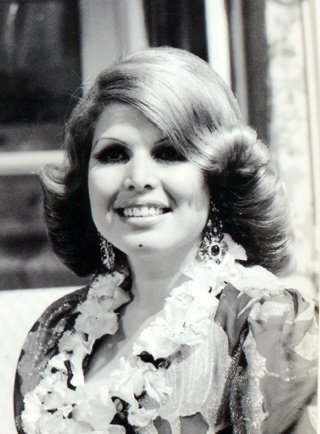

Background information
- Birth name: Halima Echeikh
- Born: 27 February 1934; Azmour, French Tunisia
- Origin: Tunisia
- Died: 18 October 2020 (aged 86); Tunis, Tunisia
- Genres: Arabic music, Tunisian music
- Occupation: Singer
- Instrument: Vocals
- Years active: 1958–1998

Halima Echeikh (Tunisian Arabic: حليمة الشيخ; February 1934 – 18 October 2020), known professionally as Naâma (Tunisian Arabic: نعمة, lit. 'Grace'), was a Tunisian singer.

== Biography ==
Naâma was born in Azmour, northern Tunisia, into a conservative family. After the divorce of her parents, she lived with her mother between Azmour and the capital city Tunis. Naâma died on 18 October 2020, aged 86, after a long illness.

== Sources ==
- Bouthina, Mohamed (1997). Naâma. The eternal voice. Tunis.
- Abassi, Hamadi (27 July 2007). "Naâma. La fille d'Ezmour". Saisons tunisiennes (in French). Archived from the original on 11 March 2009.
