= The Rachidia =

Tunisian cultural society

The Rachidia is an artistic and cultural association specializing in Tunisian music. It was created on 3 November 1934 by the intellectual, political and artistic community led by Mustapha Sfar, who was Sheikh el Medina of Tunis at that period. Another founding member and early musician of the Rachidia was Khemaïs Tarnane. The singers Chafia Rochdi and Saliha were among the first women who performed as members of the Rachidia orchestra.

The institute's orchestra, ran by Fethi Zghonda, is renowned in Tunisia and other parts of the Maghreb. The association is officially called Association of the Rachidi Institute of Tunisian Music. It is the first musical institution created in Tunisia and one of the oldest ones of Arabic music.

== History ==
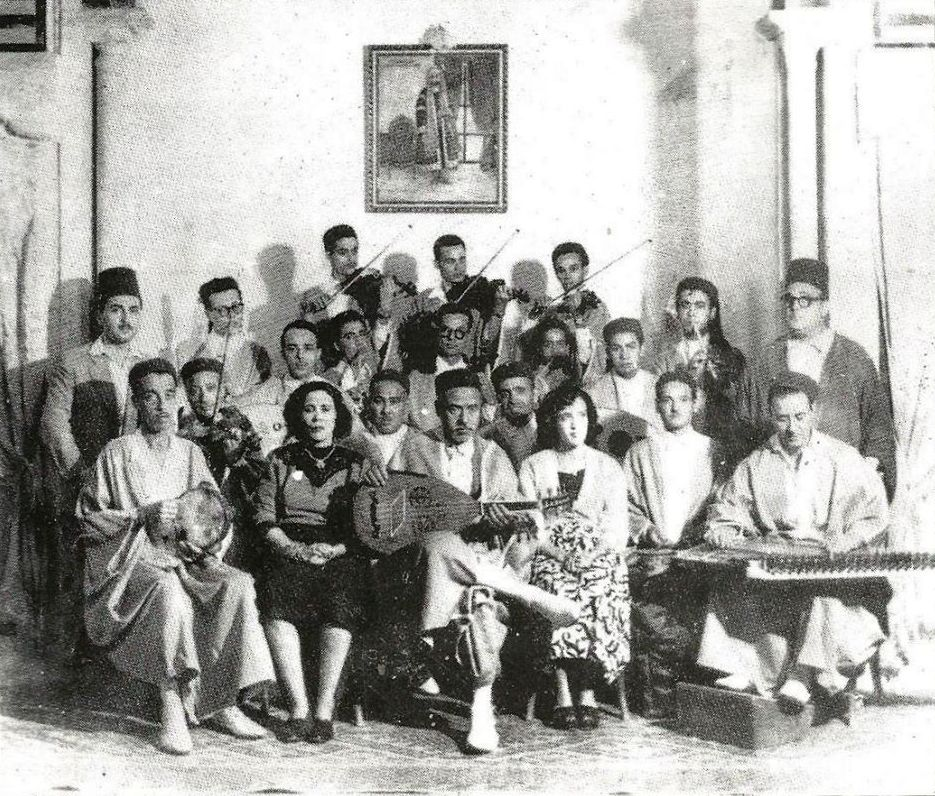
Singer Saliha (second from the left) and musician Khemaïes Tarnane with the Rachidia.

The name of the association was chosen in reference to Muhammad I ar-Rashid, third ruler of the Husainid Dynasty. He was initiated to music by his mother, an Italian aristocrat. A poet and passionate about music, he played the oud and violin. He was also interested in Andalusian classical music and worked towards enriching his country's music through Turkish music, particularly in terms of rules and rhythms of the nūbāt musical forms. Muhammad I ar-Rashid established a music school at the beylical palace Le Bardo that was maintained under his successors.

At its founding in 1934, European musical notation was introduced to create an ensemble that would incorporate the slightly different versions of the traditional melodies performed by prominent sheikhs of Tunis. Notation was introduced so that all of the orchestra's musicians could play the same version. After each sheikh had performed his own version, a transcription was written based on the different versions. Even though this transcription was “unfamiliar to everyone […], each shaykh recognised the portions he had contributed and everyone had to admit that this was the version they had agreed upon."

Concert by the Rachidia orchestra, Tunis 2009

After the country's independence in 1956, ma’luf was declared as Tunisia's national musical heritage. Since its beginnings, the Rachidia has specialized in this Tunisian genre of Andalusian classical music. Performances are given by a large and formal ensemble and chorus using musical notation and several Western along with traditional instruments of the Arab-Andalusian tradition.

== See also ==
- Music of Tunisia
- Music in Tunisian Arabic
