= Nebeur =

Coordinates: 36°17′59″N 8°46′06″E

Nebeur نبر
- Commune and town
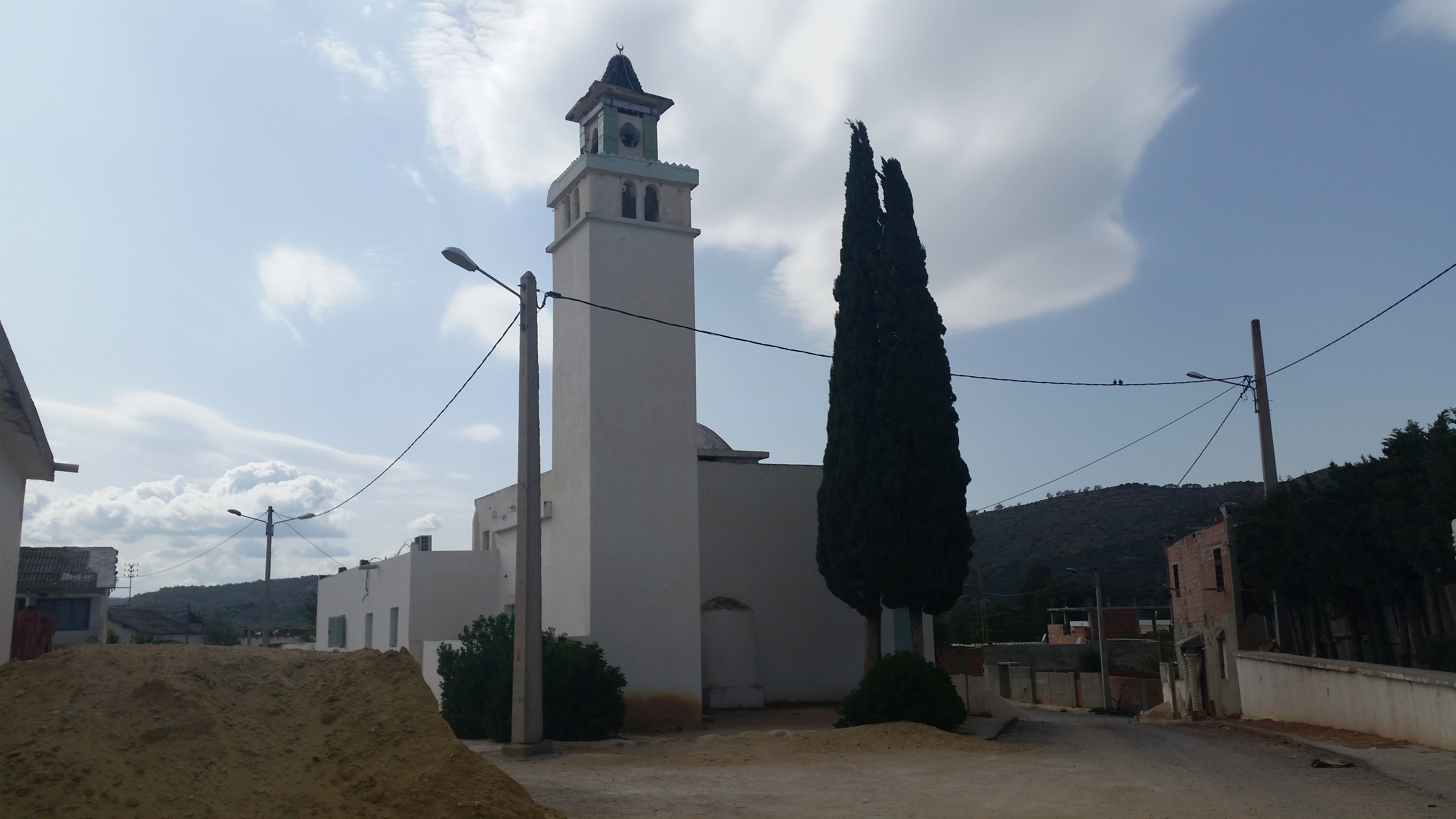
- Interactive map of Nebeur
- Country: Tunisia
- Governorate: Kef Governorate

Population (2014)
  - Total: 5,500
- Time zone: UTC+1 (CET)

Nebeur is a town and commune in the Kef Governorate, Tunisia. As of 2014 it had a population of 5,500.

== See also ==
- List of cities in Tunisia
