= Khemaïs Tarnane =

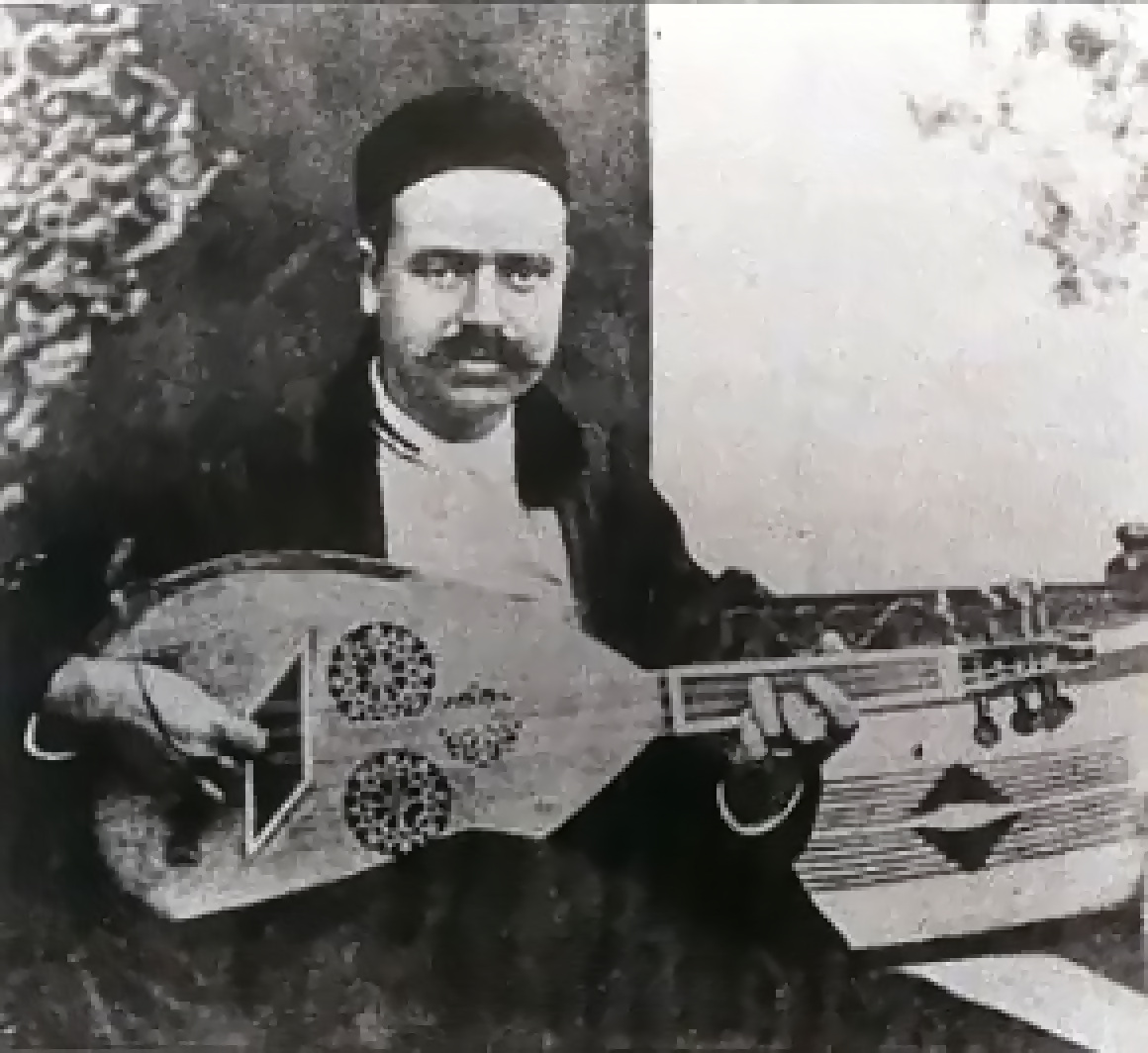
- Khemaïs Tarnane with an oud

Background information
- Born: July 1, 1894
- Origin: French Protectorate of Tunisia
- Died: October 31, 1964 (aged 70)
- Genres: Arabic music, Tunisian music
- Occupations: Singer, composer, musician
- Instrument: Vocals

Khemaïs Tarnane (Tunisian Arabic: خميّس ترنان; born Juli 1 1894 in Bizerte and died October 31, 1964) was a Tunisian singer, composer and musician. Born Khemaïs Ben Ali Ben Khemaïs Tarnane, he was one of the founders and teachers of the music society Rachidia.

== Biography ==
Khemaïs Ben Ali Ben Khemaïs Tarnane, later known as Tarnane or Khemaïs Tarnane, was born in Juli 1 1894 in Bizerte, in the French Protectorate of Tunisia. Khemaïs comes from a family of Andalusian origin who immigrated to Tunisia towards the end of the 17th century. His father Ali and his uncle Mohammed, both singers, soon passed on their musical culture to him. His uncle Ahmed takes him with him to the zaouia of Sidi Abdelkader to attend the religious songs of the troops of the brotherhood. These same troops also sing the Tunisian Ma'luf.

He contributed within the Rachidia to the collection, development and dissemination of Ma'luf. His numerous compositions in different forms constitute a reference in terms of creation, through the originality of his style combining tradition and modernity. His works have greatly enriched the Tunisian musical repertoire to which he has printed a distinctive stamp, the traces of which are often cited by ethnomusicologists.

He continued his education in a school directed by the writer Abderrahman Guiga who objected to his disciple indulging in any form of musical expression or song. He sees this field as conducive to neglecting studies and good customs.

In 1903, Tarnane entered the Franco-Arab school and became interested in a kind of flute that was called "ghal" at the time. After leaving school, he returned to his father's weaver's workshop, where he learned to weave, and frequented cafes that broadcast discs of great Egyptian singers all day long. By listening to them, he learned a considerable number of classical songs and soon formed an orchestra composed of Tunisian Jewish musicians where he played the oud.

He quickly acquired a solid reputation so that in 1915 he decided to go to Tunis to try his luck in the musical field: he gave a concert every night in a café in the medina.

In 1917, he settled in Tunis and learned Malouf, mouachahât and near-oriental adouars as well as Turkish pesherevs from the greatest masters of the time such as Cheikh Ahmed Touil and Cheikh Ahmed Ferjani.

He then formed a new orchestra with Ahmed Karoui. In this period, Tunisian music was enriched with the arrival in Tunis of a group of Jewish artists from Tripoli, including Cheikh El Afrit, who fled Italian colonialism. Tarnane recorded during this period muwashshahs, old songs as well as pieces on piano. He also met Baron Rodolphe d'Erlanger and frequented the musician Ahmed El Wafi. He also composed for many performers like Choubeïla Rached.

In November 1934 La Rachidia was formed, of which Tarnane was one of the founders and teachers. Among his famous students are Salah El Mahdi. In the 1940s, the singer Saliha entered The Rachidia and Tarnane composed the majority of her songs.

Tarnane died on October 31, 1964, at the age of 70.

== Discography ==
- Adhahab yazdadou hosnan
- Taxim raml el maya
- Ya zahratan
- Mayyaztou bayna jamalouha
- Taxim sika
- Na'ourat al anghaam wattoub
- Ya dha alladhi dhanna
- Ya moukhjilan tal'atou al aqm
- Istikhbar oud hessine saba
- In Kana lennassi 'aidon
