= Mohamed Ben Ali Triki =

Tunisian Scout leader (born 1931)

- محمد التريكي

President of Les Scouts Tunisiens

Mohamed Bin Ali Triki (Arabic: محمد التريكي; Berber languages: ⵎⵓⵀⴰⵎⴷ ⵜⵔⵉⴽⵉ) (born 1931) is a Tunisian government official who served as President of Les Scouts Tunisiens, as well as Chairman of the Arab Regional Scout Committee.

In 2002, he became a member of the World Scout Committee and promoted and hosted the 37th World Scout Conference and the 9th World Scout Youth Forum in Hammemet. The World Scout Committee appointed him to serve as liaison to the International Union of Muslim Scouts.

In 1999, he was awarded the 279th Bronze Wolf, the only distinction of the World Organization of the Scout Movement, awarded by the World Scout Committee for exceptional services to world Scouting.
