= XIII Bis Records =

French independent record label

XIII BIS Records is an independent record label based in Paris, France, that releases music in a variety of genres.

== Artists ==
XIII BIS has issued releases by the following artists:

- Adagio
- Marc Almond
- Alain Chamfort
- Ray Charles
- Lloyd Cole
- Dagoba
- Elmer Food Beat
- Fiction Plane
- Michel Fugain
- Will Haven
- Heavenly
- Mick Hucknall
- Michael Jones
- La Caravane Passe
- Living Colour
- Loudblast
- Ziggy Marley
- Myrath
- Nine Inch Nails
- Paul Personne
- Prefab Sprout
- Patrick Rondat
- Rammstein
- Susheela Raman
- Calvin Russell
- Simply Red
- Skindred
- Skinlab
- Suede
- Tears for Fears
- The Gladiators
- The Hall Effect
- The Parlotones
- Tarja Turunen
- Vulcain
- Weepers Circus

== See also ==
- List of record labels
