= Myrath =

Tunisian progressive metal band

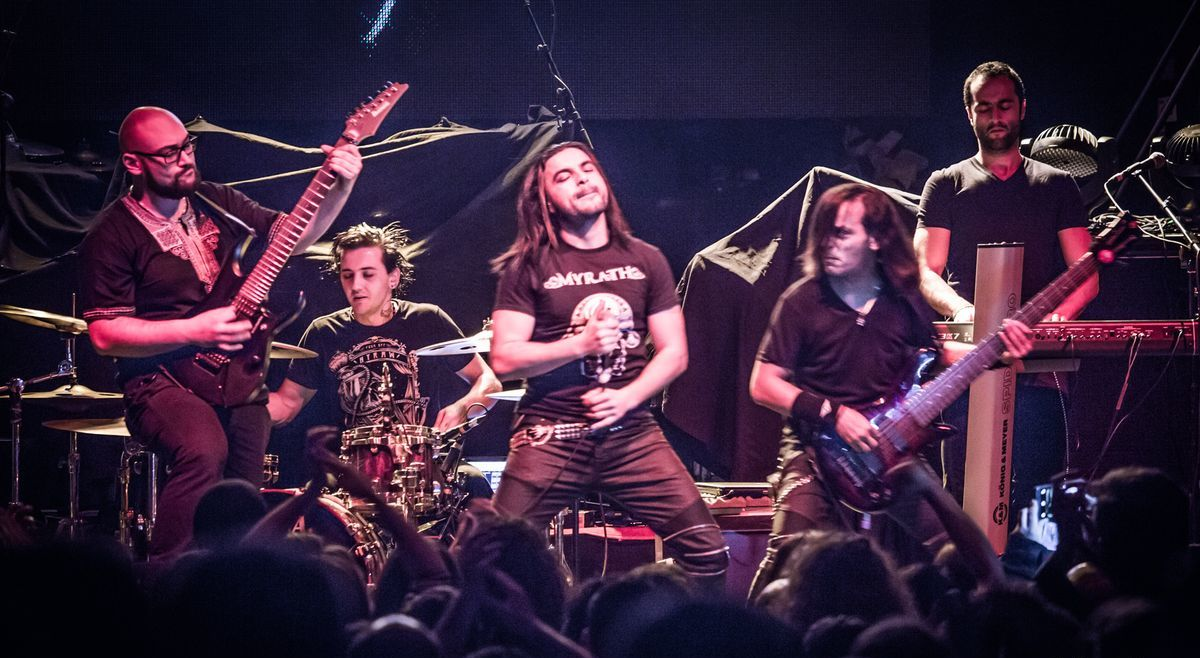
- Myrath performing in Madrid, Spain (L-R: Malek Ben Arbia, Morgan Berthet, Zaher Zorgati, Anis Jouini, Elyes Bouchoucha)

Background information
- Also known as: X-Tazy (2001–2005)
- Origin: Tunisia
- Genres: Progressive metal; power metal; oriental metal
- Years active: 2001–present
- Labels: EarMusic, VeryCords, Nightmare Records, King Records, Groove Master
- Members: Malek Ben Arbia; Morgan Berthet; Anis Jouini; Zaher Zorgati; Kevin Codfert
- Past members: Walid Issaoui; Fahmi Chakroun; Saif Louhibi; Zaher Hamoudia; Tarek Idouani; Piwee Desfray; Elyes Bouchoucha
- Website: myrath.com

Myrath (Arabic: ميراث mīrāth, "Legacy") is a Tunisian progressive metal band formed in 2001 by guitarist Malek Ben Arbia and currently based in France. The band has been noted for its mix of Arabic and Middle Eastern instrumentation with power metal and progressive rock and is considered an important band in oriental metal. They call their own sound "blazing desert metal". They are the first band from Tunisia to be signed to a record label outside the country.

== Career ==
=== Early history ===
Guitarist Malek Ben Arbia, then age 13, formed the band, first named X-Tazy, in 2001 with some childhood friends. The band played covers of blues, heavy metal, and death metal songs. Amongst numerous lineup changes, keyboardist/singer Elyes Bouchoucha joined in 2003 and remained with the band until 2020. They eventually moved toward a progressive metal and oriental metal sound. In 2005 they released the EP Double Face via USB flash drives in Tunisia. The album gained some notice in Europe, leading to a contract with France's Bremmis Music. Now known as Myrath, the band became the first Tunisian act to sign with a European label. During this period they met French musician Kevin Codfert, who has been their producer ever since.

Their first album under the name Myrath, produced by Codfert, was Hope in 2007. At this time the band included Arbia and Bouchoucha with bassist Anis Jouini, who became a permanent member, plus drummer Saif Louhibi. Shortly after the release of Hope, singer Zaher Zorgati joined the band and took over lead vocals from Bouchoucha. Zorgati's ability to combine Islamic chants with heavy metal wailing became a key component of Myrath's sound, while the band's lyrics began to focus on Tunisian folklore.

The album Desert Call was released in 2010; this album's sound was compared favorably to that of Orphaned Land. Tales of the Sands followed in 2011. Drummer Morgan Berthet joined the band in 2012, forming a stable lineup for the next several years. They began to play European summer festivals regularly, and their first American appearance was at the ProgPower USA festival in 2013.

=== International recognition ===
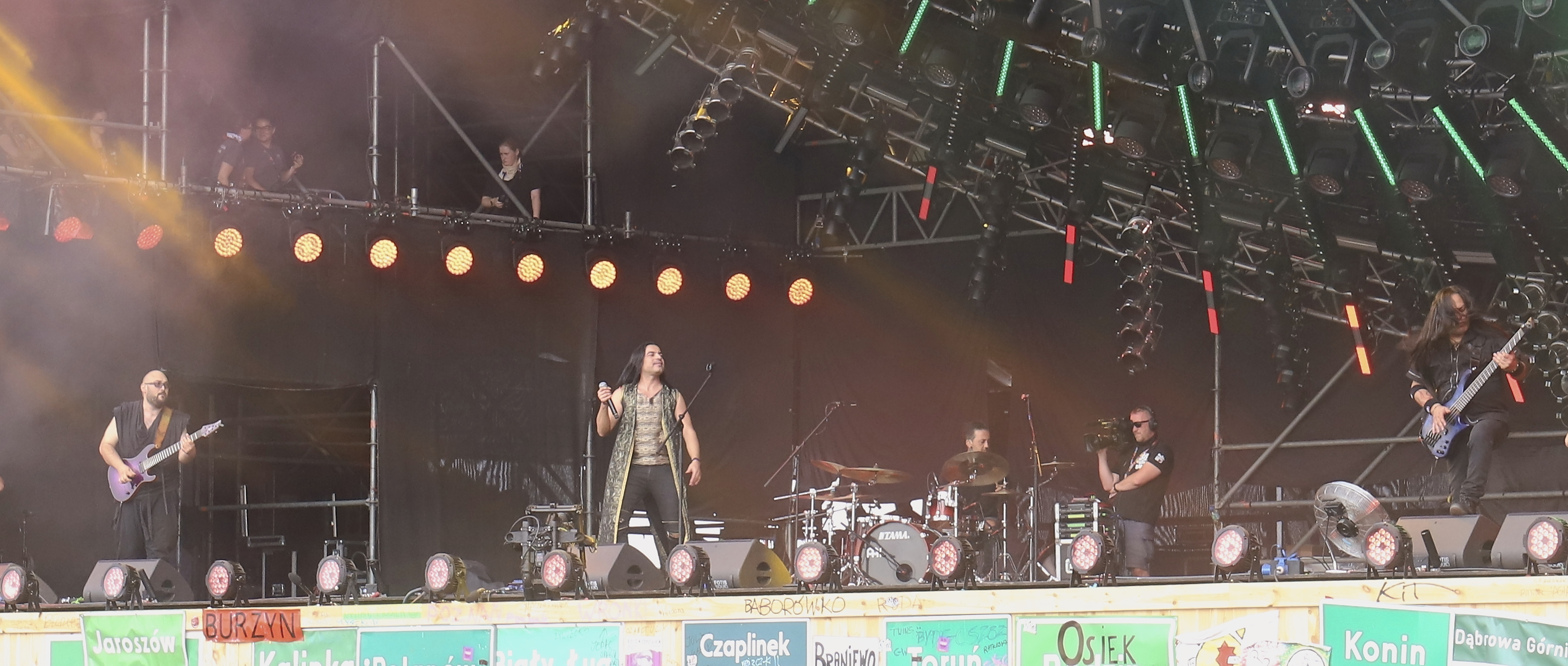
Myrath performing at Pol'and'Rock Festival 2024

Myrath opened for Symphony X during a high-profile tour of England in 2016. The album Legacy, featuring lyrics contributed by Tunisian poets, was released later in 2016. Also that year, Zorgati made a guest appearance on the album The Source by Ayreon. Myrath then toured around the world consistently for more than two years and appeared at several international music festivals. During this period they signed an international deal with EarMusic.

In 2017, Myrath performed in their native Tunisia for the first time in three years with a concert at the historic Theatre of Carthage. This performance was recorded for the live album Live in Carthage, released in 2019. Their fifth studio album Shehili was also released in 2019. They appeared at the Sweden Rock Festival in 2019 as a last-minute replacement for Behemoth; and have been invited to return for future versions of the festival. They also toured with the Dutch symphonic metal band Epica in 2019. In 2021, Zorgati provided guest vocals on the track "Code of Life" on the Epica album Omega.

In July 2022 the band announced via their social media that it separated from Elyes Bouchoucha back in 2020. Their sixth album Karma was released on 8 March 2024.

Their seventh album Wilderness of Mirrors was released on 27 March 2026.

== Discography ==
=== Studio albums ===
Album	Release date	Length	Labels	Personnel
Hope	9 September 2007	51:50	Brennus Music	Elyes Bouchoucha – lead, backing vocals and keyboards; Malek Ben Arbia – guitars; Anis Jouini – bass; Saif Louhibi – drums
Desert Call	25 January 2010	65:05	XIII Bis Records; Nightmare Records	Zaher Zorgati – lead and backing vocals; Malek Ben Arbia – guitars; Anis Jouini – bass; Elyes Bouchoucha – keyboards, backing vocals; Saif Louhibi – drums
Tales of the Sands	27 September 2011	45:09	XIII Bis Records; Nightmare Records	Zaher Zorgati – lead and backing vocals; Malek Ben Arbia – guitars; Anis Jouini – bass; Elyes Bouchoucha – keyboards, backing vocals; Kevin Codfert – keyboards, pianos, backing vocals; Piwee Desfray – drums
Legacy	19 February 2016	50:43	Verycords (Europe); Nightmare Records (USA); Groove Master (MENA); King Records (Japan)	Zaher Zorgati – lead and backing vocals; Malek Ben Arbia – guitars; Anis Jouini – bass; Elyes Bouchoucha – keyboards, backing vocals; Kevin Codfert – keyboards, pianos, backing vocals; Morgan Bethet – drums
Shehili	5 March 2019	47:26	earMUSIC	Zaher Zorgati – lead vocals; Malek Ben Arbia – guitars; Anis Jouini – bass; Elyes Bouchoucha – keyboards, backing vocals; Kevin Codfert – keyboards, pianos, backing vocals; Morgan Berthet – drums
Karma	8 March 2024	47:37	earMUSIC	Zaher Zorgati – lead vocals; Malek Ben Arbia – guitars; Anis Jouini – bass; Kevin Codfert – keyboards, pianos, backing vocals; Morgan Berthet – drums
Wilderness of Mirrors	27 March 2026	46:56	earMUSIC	Zaher Zorgati – lead vocals; Malek Ben Arbia – guitars; Anis Jouini – bass; Kevin Codfert – keyboards, pianos, backing vocals; Morgan Berthet – drums

=== EPs ===
- 2005: Double Face. under the name of Xtazy.

=== Live albums ===
- 2020: Live in Carthage.

=== Compilation albums ===
- 2018: Merciless Times.
- 2025: Reflections

== Members ==
=== Current members ===
- Malek Ben Arbia – guitar (2001–present)
- Anis Jouini – bass guitar (2006–present)
- Zaher Zorgati – lead vocals (2007–present)
- Morgan Berthet – drums (2012–present)
- Kevin Codfert – keyboards, piano (session member: (2004-2006, 2015-2022), full-time member: 2022–present)
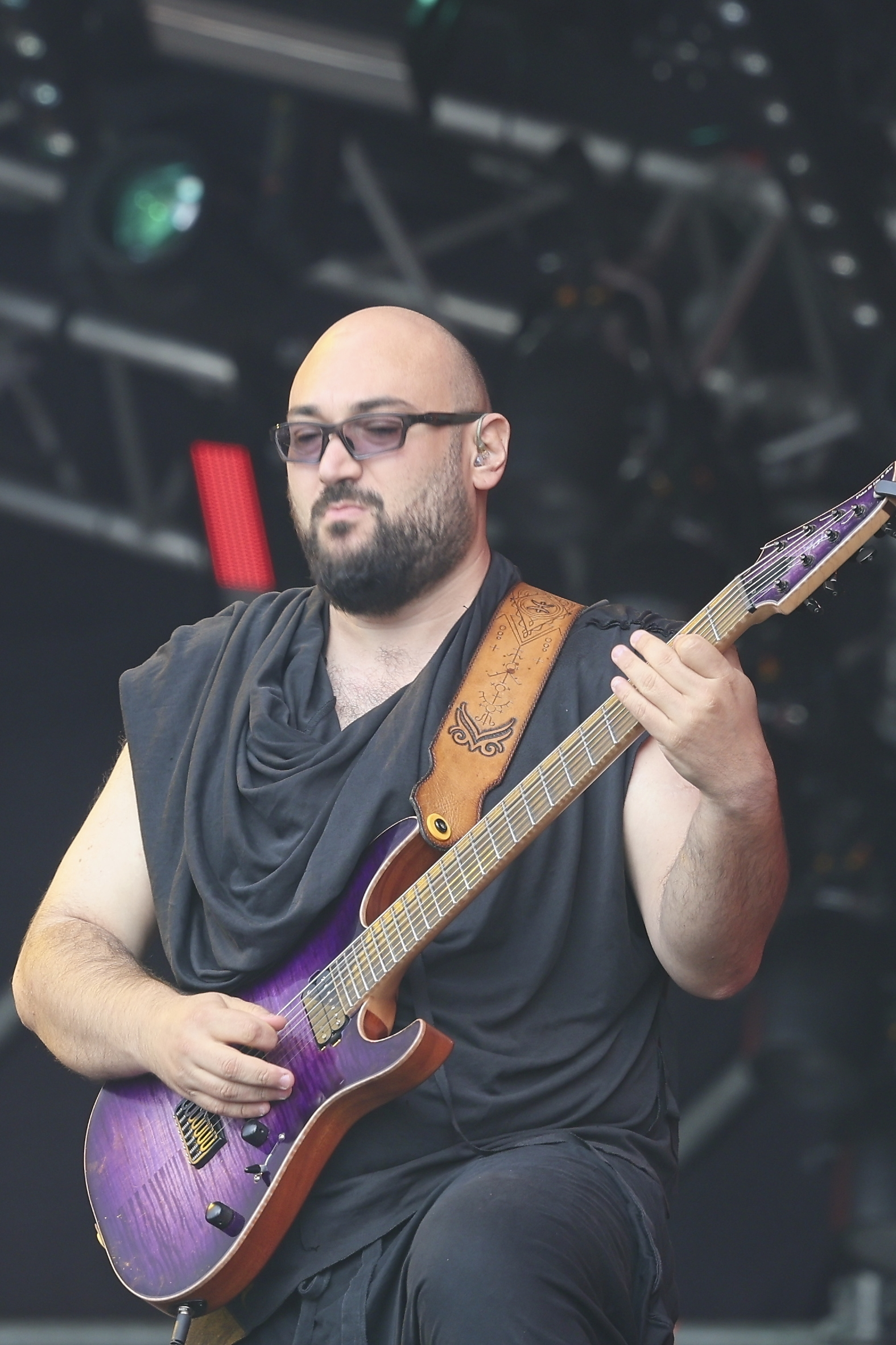
Malek Ben Arbia

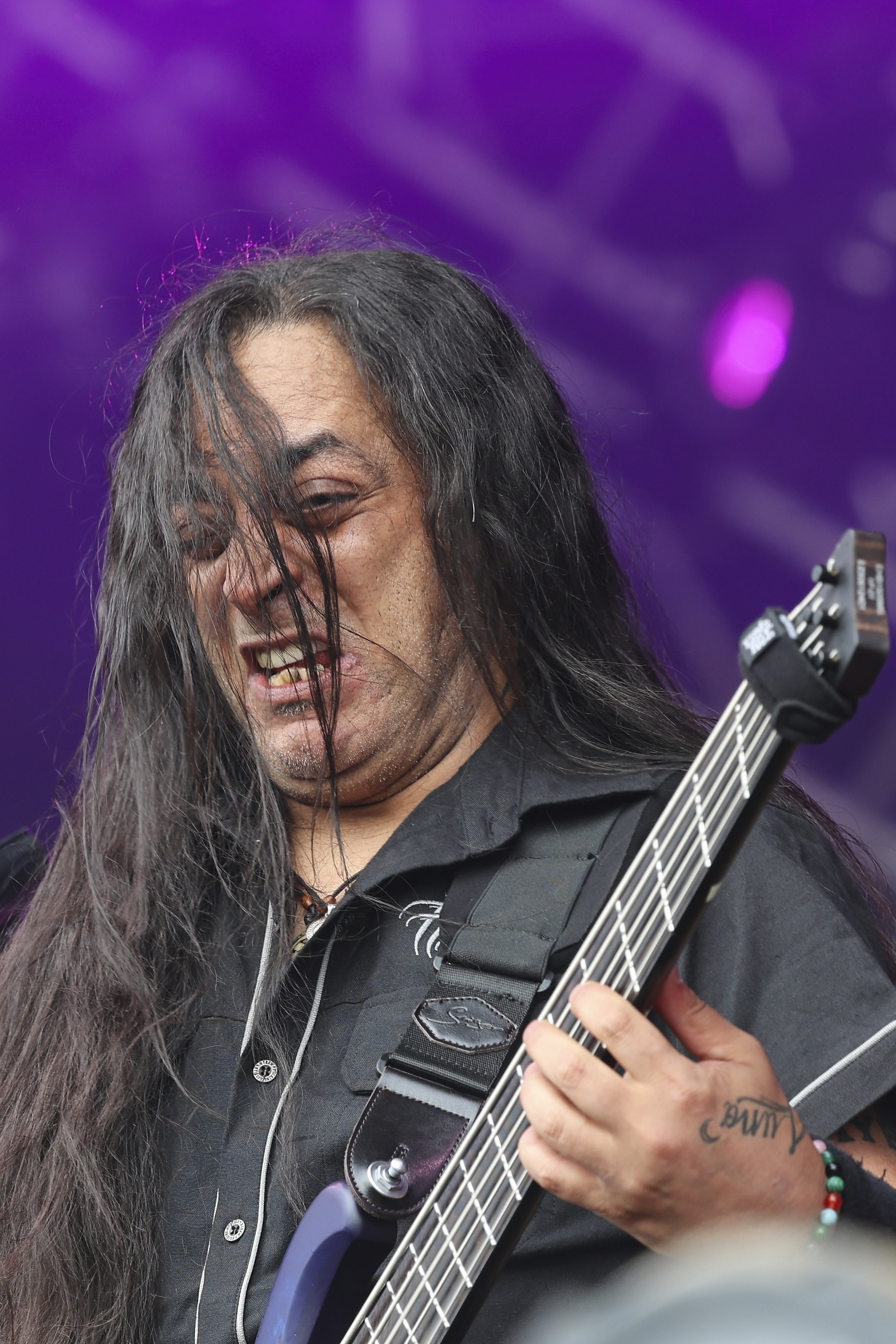
Anis Jouini

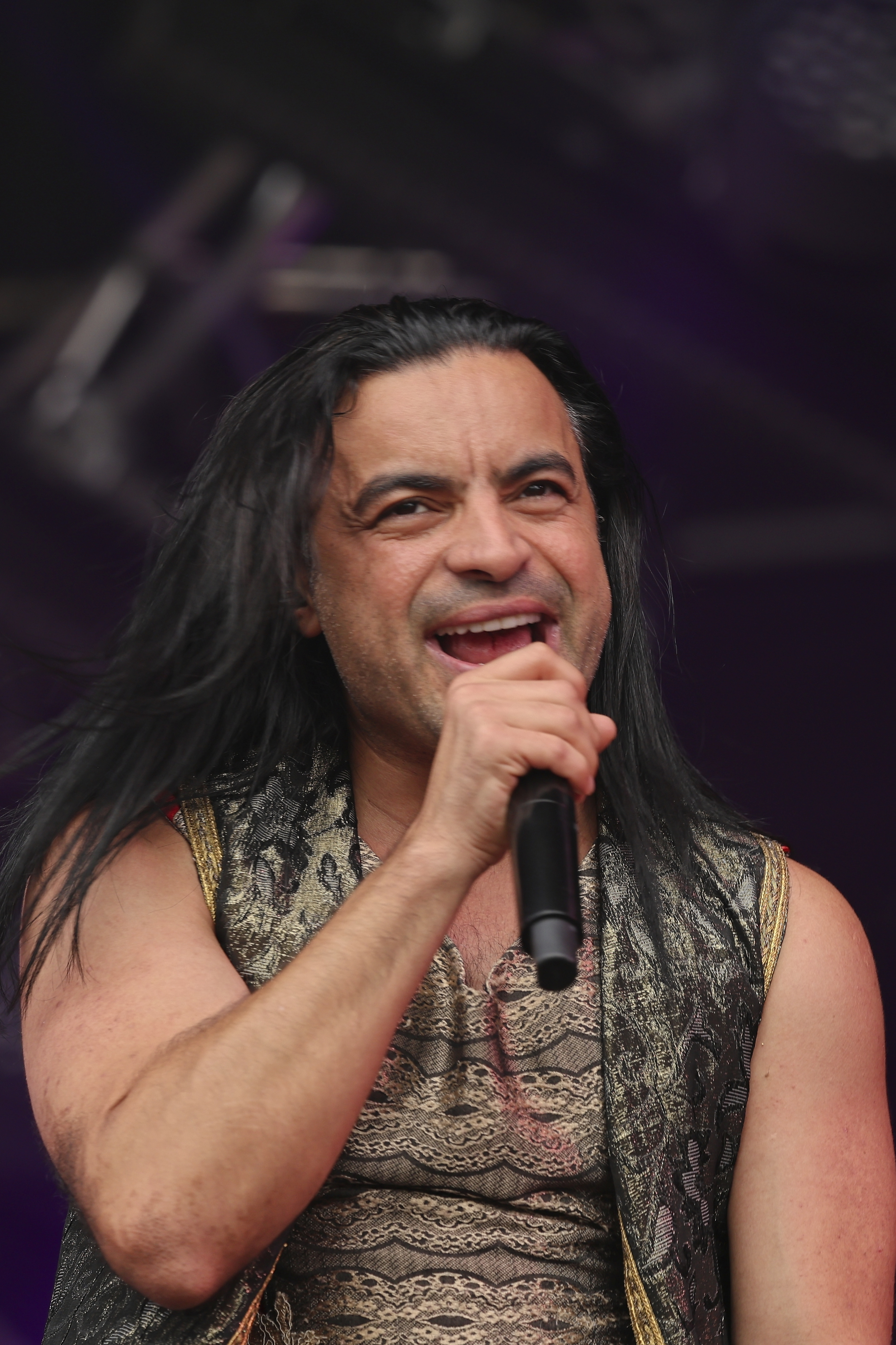
Zaher Zorgati

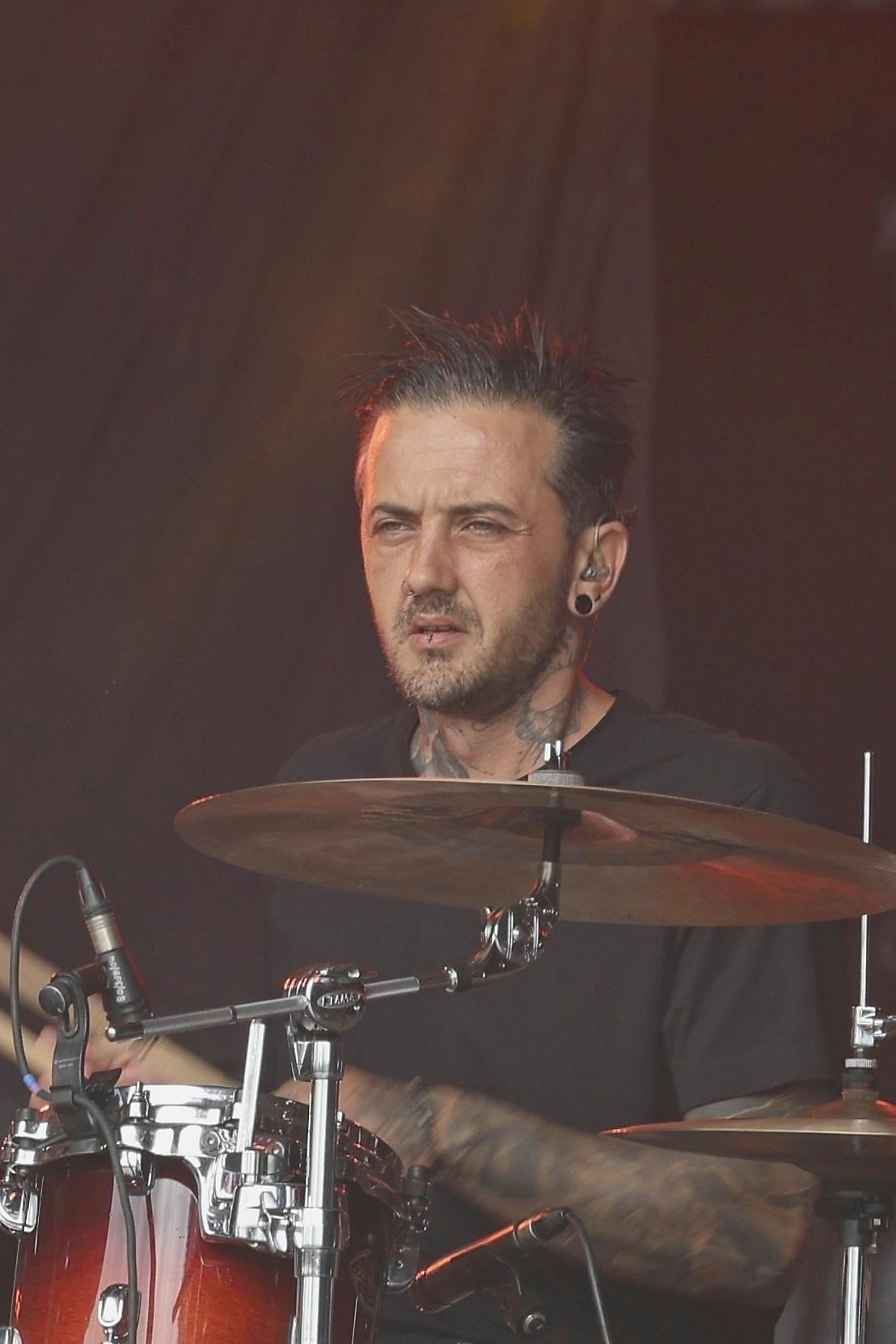
Morgan Berthet

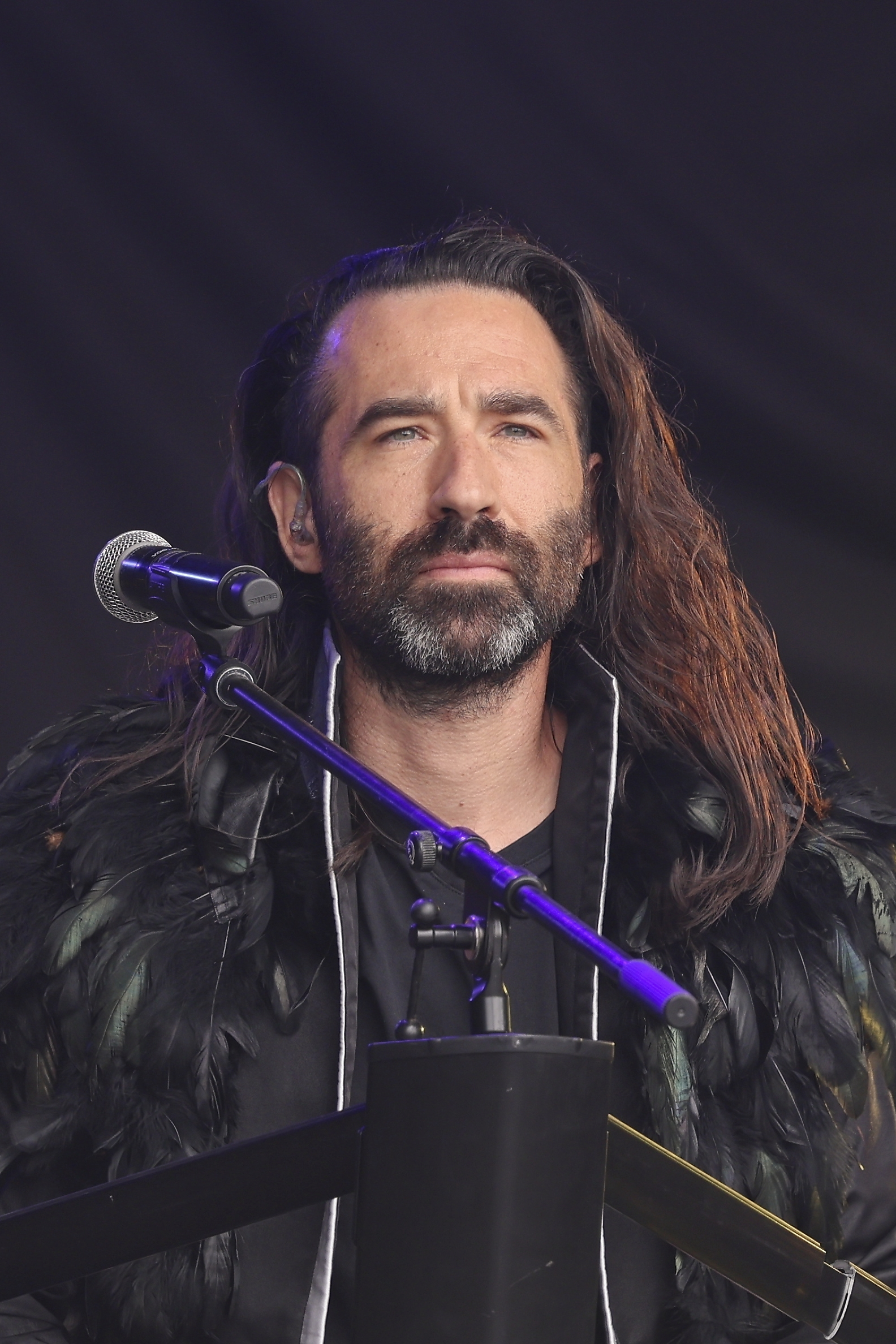
Kevin Codfert

=== Former members ===
- Walid Issaoui – guitar (2001–2003)
- Fahmi Chakroun – drums (2001–2004)
- Saief Louhibi – drums (2004–2011)
- Yassine Belgith - bass (2004-2006)
- Zaher Hamoudia – bass (2001–2004)
- Tarek Idouani – lead vocals (2001–2003)
- Piwee Desfray – drums (2011-2012)
- Elyes Bouchoucha – lead vocals (2003–2007), keyboards, backing vocals (2003–2022)
