= Ghazi Abdel Baki =

Lebanese musician (born 1969)

Ghazi Abdel Baki غازي عبد الباقي
- Born: 1969 (age 56–57)
- Origin: Beirut, Lebanon
- Genres: Bedouin Funk, Jazz Fusion, Alternative Arabic, World Music, Middle Eastern Music,
- Occupations: Musician, Composer, Producer
- Years active: 1985–present
- Label: Forward Music
- Website: www.forwardmusic.net

Ghazi Abdel Baki is a musician, composer, producer. He founded in 2001 Forward Music and since then has produced more than 40 albums and more than 300 concerts for several artists in the Middle-East.

== Early life ==
Born in 1969, Abdel Baki, started playing the drums at the age of ten in war-torn Beirut. By the age of twelve, he started rigging the balconies of his childhood home with microphones and recording live sounds of gun battles and shelling on a rudimentary 4-track cassette recorder. He spent his time mixing them with his early guitar compositions and created a personal soundtrack of his early years in Lebanon. At 15, he started performing with his band “Amnesia” in Beirut's thriving underground music scene, performing numerous concerts and getting acquainted with veterans of the local scene, including Munir Khauli, Sami Shabshab, Walid Etayem, Abboud Saadi, and Ziad Rahbani.

== Education ==
Collège Louise Wegmann, Lebanon, 1986

Rensselaer Polytechnic Institute, New York - USA, BS Industrial Engineering 1991

The New School for Social Research, New York - USA, MA Media Studies, 1994

In 1988, Ghazi moved to New York and pursued his studies in Industrial Engineering at Rensselaer Polytechnic Institute in Troy. He continued in parallel to play music and still experimented with recording at the university's studios. Ghazi played with psychedelic rock band “ Nobody’s Fault”, and performed in several venues in Albany and Troy, New York.

In 1992, Ghazi moved to New York City to pursue a master's degree in Media Studies at The New School For Social Research. In parallel, he established his first recording studio on Orchard Street and started recording his first album “Crucial”, with fellow musician Ramzi Moufarrej and with the participation of John Benitez on Bass, Bob Franceschini on Saxes and Bassam Saba on Nay.

In 1995, Ghazi returned to Lebanon and started teaching Media Studies at the Lebanese American University in Beirut, and continued performing live. He played the drums with Ziad Rahbani for more than two years during Ziad's comeback in 1996–1998, with the Munir Khauli Group and with fusion band “Virus”. In 1999, he went on to record the live album “Beirut Salsa” with fellow musicians Abboud Saadi, Hani Siblini, Fouad Afra and Hratch Kassis.

== Production Work ==
In 2001, Ghazi Abdel Baki created the World Music label Forward Music. He went on to produce the works of several renowned artists, including: Charbel Rouhana, Ghada Shbeir, Ziyad Sahhab, Soumaya Baalbaki, Issa Ghandour, Mustafa Said, and Fareeq El Atrash, as well as producing his own music. Ghazi also wrote music for films and recorded his first solo album in 2004 “ Communiqué #1”.

In 2007, Abdel Baki released his second solo album “ Communiqué #2” and started performing live as a solo artist. During this time he produced Ghada Shbeir's debut album, “Al Muwashahat”, that went on to win the BBC World Music Awards following the landmark performance at the Barbican Hall in London in 2007. By the end of 2009, Ghazi released his third solo album “The Final Communiqué” and continued performing live.

By 2010, Ghazi Abdel Baki had already produced and published more than 30 albums and began managing the careers of many of Forward Music's recording artists. The Label started then producing Music Festivals in Beirut, and participated in live concerts in Damascus, Cairo, Dubai, Paris, Montreal, Marseille and London, among others. In 2011, Forward Music was recognized by the industry and by the press as the leading independent Music Label for World Music in the Middle East and expanded its distribution to artists such as Toufic Farroukh, Oumeima El Khalil, Tania Saleh, Ziad Ahmadieh, Soap Kills, Hazem Chaheen, Nida' Abou Mrad, Rayess Bek, Lethal Skillz and Lena Chamamyan.

== Live Music - The Democratic Republic of Music DRM ==
In 2011, Ghazi Abdel Baki created the Beirut live concert venue “The Democratic Republic of Music DRM”, owned and managed by Forward Music. During its four years of operations, the venue hosted around 350 concerts with performing artists, such as: Stanley Jordan, Joey DeFrancesco, Tony Allen (musician), The musicians of the Nile, Henri Texier, Souad Massi, Ilham al-Madfai, Toufic Farroukh, Nemr Abou Nassar, and more...

== Discography ==
- Crucial (1994)
- Beirut Salsa (1999)
- Communiqué #1 (2004)
- We Live (2006)
- Communiqué#2 (2007)
- The Last Communiqué (2009)
- Ghazi Abdel Baki Live (2015)
- Watad (2019)
- Sarab (2020)

Reference: iTunes
