= Music of North Africa =

North African music
Algeria	Arabic	Berber	Tuareg
Morocco	Berber
Western Sahara
Tunisia
Libya
See also: Mauritania - Sudan

The music of North Africa has contributed considerably to popular music, especially Egyptian classical music alongside el Gil, Algerian raï and Chaabi. The western region is also called Maghreb (excluding Egypt), and the term Maghrebi music is in use. For a variety of reasons Libya does not have as extensive nor popular a tradition as its neighbours.

Folk music abounds and exists in multiple forms across the region. The Berber people, Sephardic Jews, Tuaregs, Copts and Nubians, for example, retain musical traditions with their ancient roots.

Andalusian music has been especially influential, and is played in widely varying forms across the Maghreb region. This music was imported from Al-Andalus in the 15th century after the Spanish reconquista that expelled the Moors from the Iberian peninsula. The Spanish conquest of the historically Muslim parts of the Iberian Peninsula resulted in the emigration of Iberian Muslims towards the Maghreb, who were themselves descended from people from across the Mediterranean. These people brought with them a tradition that had historically arisen as a fusion of various kinds of Muslim music from Damascus, Baghdad, Egypt and elsewhere. Derivatives of this style are Andalusi nubah and al-âla in Morocco, chaabi and other related styles in Algeria and ma'luf in Tunisia.

== Traditions ==
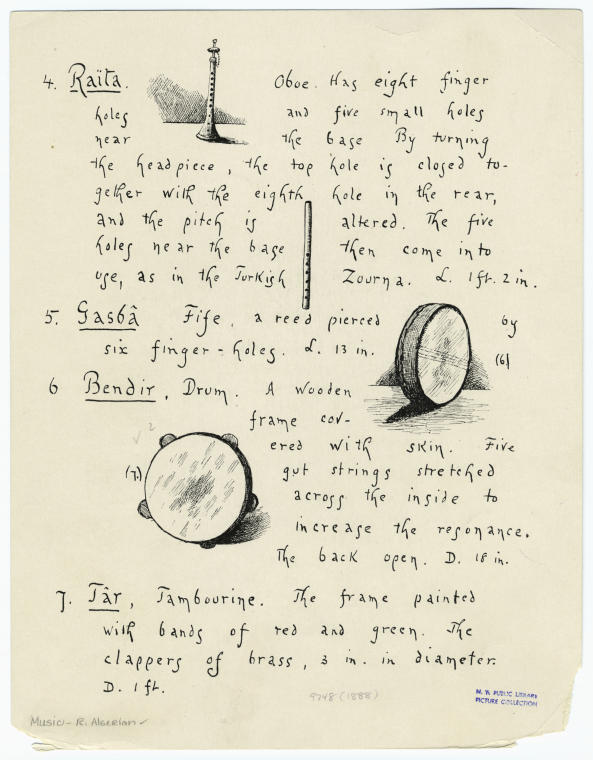
Some common instruments used in traditional North African music

=== Algeria ===
Of all the North African countries, Algeria's popular music may be the best-known abroad. Raï, a style of urban popular music developed in early 20th century Oran, has become a common sound in parts of Europe, especially France, which has a large Algerian population, since the late 1980s. The music of the Berber Kabyle people and Algerian chaabi are both also renowned throughout the country and in France.

Developed from musical styles that were introduced from Al-Andalus in the 15th century, the Algerian Andalusi nubah is a genre of classical Maghrebi music that has remained popular with musicians and musical audiences. Over the years, it has inspired related styles like the Algerian chaabi and hawzii.

=== Tunisia ===
Tunisia is best known as the centre for ma'luf, a derivative of the Andalusian music imported to North Africa in the 15th century. Since the 1930s, a number of organisations (as well as the first President of Tunisia, Habib Bourguiba) have been promoting ma'luf as an integral aspect of Tunisian culture, helping to keep the ancient tradition alive.

Since the 2000s, modern styles have penetrated the market and been adapted to Tunisian culture, such as reggae or hip hop. Many artists like Weld El 15 received public notoriety from the Tunisian revolution for criticising the ancient regime in its abuse of power during the country's democratisation process.

=== Libya ===
Libyan music, like the music of other North African countries, consists of both local and foreign elements. The factors important to the development of music in Libya are: indigenous North African music, Arabic music theory, language and culture, and Ottoman Turkish music. Because of these factors, Libya's musical heritage can be further divided into four types: 1. Ceremonial music that is associated with the culture and customs of the Sufi-Turugs. 2. Classical vocal music that belongs to the traditional Arab music of Al-Andalus (Muslim Spain, 730-1494 Ad.), and includes Al-muash'shahat and Al-maluf. 3. Classical instrumental music, which evolved from the Arab art-music heritage and was inspired by Turkish elements. 4. Libyan folk music, which also features Central African and Arab musical influences styles.

=== Egypt ===
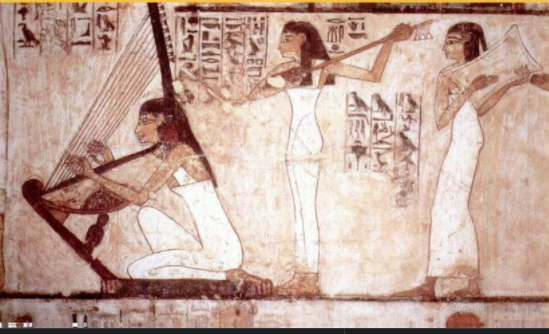
An ancient Egyptian mural of people playing music.

Egypt's best-known popular tradition is the classical Egyptian music of stars including Umm Kulthum and Abdel Halim Hafez. Other prominent modern styles include Shaabi, el Gil, and Egyptian pop.
