= The Rough Guide to Arabic Revolution =

The Rough Guide To Arabic Revolution

Compilation album by Various artists
- Released: 26 March 2013
- Genre: World, Arabic
- Length: 103:12
- Label: World Music Network

Full series chronology
The Rough Guide To Irish Music (2013)	The Rough Guide To Arabic Revolution (2013)	The Rough Guide To African Disco (2013)

The Rough Guide To Arabic Revolution is a world music compilation album originally released in 2013 featuring music relating to the contemporaneous Arab Spring revolutionary wave. Part of the World Music Network Rough Guides series, the album contains two discs: a compilation Disc One featuring protest songs ranging from traditional music to Arabic hip hop, and a "bonus" Disc Two highlighting Ramy Essam, whose song "Irhal" (Leave) is widely considered the anthem of the Egyptian Revolution.

Disc One features four Egyptian tracks, four Palestinian tracks, two Tunisian, and one each from Libya, Lebanon, and the UK. The album was compiled by Daniel Rosenberg, who also wrote the sleeve notes. The compilation was produced by Phil Stanton, co-founder of the World Music Network.

== Critical reception ==
Professional ratings
Review scores
Source	Rating
PopMatters	7/10 stars

The album was met with generally positive reviews. Tony Hillier of Australian music magazine Rhythms called it "one of the more intriguing recent compilations from the admirable World Music Network label." David Maine of PopMatters commended the producers for "expanding the bounds of its musical series in this fashion" and especially praised the hip hop as "the best stuff here".

== Track listing ==
=== Disc One ===
No.	Title	Artist (Country)	Length
1.	"Taty Taty"	Ramy Essam (Egypt)	2:01
2.	"Kelmti Horra (My Word Is Free)"	Emel Mathlouthi (Tunisia)	6:27
3.	"Heela Heela"	El Tanbura (Egypt)	3:41
4.	"Hon Enwaladet - Born Here (Arabic Version)"	DAM Feat. Abeer Al Zinati (Palestine) (Israel)	3:34
5.	"State of the Nation"	El Général feat. Mr Shooma (Tunisia)	4:02
6.	"Sout El Horeya"	Cairokee (Egypt)	4:01
7.	"I'm Your Hope"	Sami Yusuf (Iran) (United Kingdom)	2:44
8.	"Calling the Libyan Youth"	Ibn Thabit (Libya)	2:42
9.	"Metlak Mesh 3ayzin"	May Matar (Lebanon)	3:30
10.	"Kafkef Domouak"	Ramzi Aburedwan and The Palestine National Ensemble of Arabic Music	4:37
11.	"Rahil"	Ramzi Aburedwan (Palestine)	6:56
12.	"Ya Masr Hanet We Banet"	Mustafa Said (Egypt)	10:05
13.	"Et Nous, Nous Aimons La Vie"	Ramzi Aburedwan and Dal'Ouna (Palestine)	8:30

=== Disc Two ===
All tracks on Disc Two are performed by Ramy Essam.

No.	Title	Length
1.	"Etma3zam"	3:05
2.	"Action"	2:35
3.	"3ahd Mubark"	3:10
4.	"3oksha"	2:56
5.	"Bata2ty"	2:50
6.	"Sabona w Khazoo2"	1:37
7.	"Shay El-Thawra"	2:50
8.	"8 April"	1:18
9.	"Mal3oon"	2:47
10.	"El-Masala"	2:34
11.	"Bta2ty Acoustic"	2:16
12.	"Dabora w Short"	2:18
13.	"El-Ga7sh Wel 7omar"	2:38
14.	"Nafadt"	2:02
15.	"Tartoor"	2:59
16.	"Al-Masry Al-Asly"	2:27
