= Mohamed Hassan (Libyan musician) =

Mohamed Hassan محمد حسن
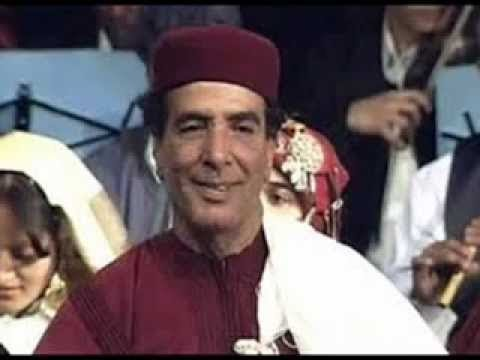

Background information
- Born: 1944; Al-Khums, Libya
- Died: 17 December 2017 (aged 73) Tunisia
- Genres: Arabic, Andalusi, Chaabi, Ma'luf
- Years active: 1970–2017

Mohamed Hassan (Arabic: محمد حسن, c. 1944 – 17 December 2017) was a Libyan singer and composer who rose to fame in Libya and North Africa in the early 1970s for his patriotic and Pan-Arabic songs. He would remain a popular Libyan musician and singer until his death in 2017. He was known as Gaddafi's "Court Musician".

== Biography ==
Mohamed Hassan was born to a poor Bedouin family in Al-Khums sometime around 1944. His musical career began in the 1960s when he joined the choir of the Libyan Radio Company and he published his first song in June, 1970. The song was political in nature and celebrated Colonel Muammar Gaddafi's expulsion of foreign military bases from the country. The song was a classic hit and it began Hassan's rise to fame. Hassan would idolise Gaddafi throughout his rule and many of his songs praised him and his regime, despite Hassan never officially being under the employment of the Libyan government. He was the most prominent member of a circle of popular singers who would propagandise for Gaddafi's regime by producing patriotic songs that celebrated his achievements as a revolutionary and glorified him. He was known as Gaddafi's "Court Musician".

During the First Libyan Civil War Hassan made an appearance on Libyan State TV where he called for peace talks but also refused to denounce Gaddafi or his regime. This lead many to accuse Hassan of favouring Gaddafi's side and this made producers shun him after the Rebel victory, temporarily putting his musical career on hold. Regardless, Hassan was able to make a musical return in 2014 in which he called for the reconciliation and rebuilding of Libya.

Hassan died on 17 December 2017 in a hospital in Tunisia after succumbing to a throat tumour. Several artists and writers attended his funeral. The post-Gaddafi government refused to celebrate his legacy due to his connections to the Gaddafi regime.

== Honours ==
- First Class of the Order of the Grand Conqueror (Libya)
- Grand Officer of the National Order of Merit (Tunisia)
