= Music of Libya =

Libya is a North African country with a predominantly Arabic-speaking population and a rich musical heritage influenced by Arab-Andalusian traditions, Ottoman rule, and local Bedouin and Amazigh cultures. Various kinds of Arab music are popular, including Andalusi music (locally known as Malouf), Chaabi, and Arab classical music.

During the Ottoman period, Turkish musical influences were incorporated into Libyan music, though the Andalusian foundation remained important. Libyan folk music also reflects regional diversity, with Bedouin and Amazigh musical traditions especially present in Cyrenaica and the southern Fezzan region.

Two of the most famous musicians of Libya are Ahmed Fakroun and Mohamed Hassan.

Among Libyan Arabs, instruments include the zokra (a bagpipe), flute (made of bamboo), tambourine, oud (a fretless lute) and darbuka, a goblet drum held sideways and played with the fingers. Intricate clapping is also common in Libyan folk music.

Traveling Bedouin poet-singers have spread many popular songs across Libya. Among their styles is huda, the camel driver's song, the rhythm of which is said to mimic the feet of a walking camel.

In addition to these styles, there is also a tradition of ululation, a high-pitched, trilling vocalization, often performed by women at celebrations and gatherings.

During the 2011 revolution, the Amazigh singer Dania Ben Sassi went viral with her songs praising the sacrifices of the Libyan people, sung in Tamazight.

Libyan authorities have cracked down on rap music for violating "moral rules".

== Traditional music ==
=== Malouf ===
Ma'luf, one of Libya's most notable musical forms, traces its origins to Andalusian music brought to North Africa following the expulsion of the Moors from Spain in the 15th century. This genre is traditionally structured around 24 nubas, each subdivided into five sections called mīzān, with performances often lasting six to seven hours and beginning with an instrumental prelude known as a tushiya. Libyan Ma'luf is related to similar styles found in Tunisia, Algeria (Gharnati), and Morocco (Ala), but it has its own distinctive repertoire and performance style. Traditional instruments like the oud and bendir are central to this music.

=== Chaabi ===
Libyan Chaabi is a popular genre of folk music that resonates deeply with urban and rural communities across the country. Rooted in traditional North African musical styles, Chaabi in Libya combines lively rhythms, poetic lyrics, and call-and-response vocal patterns that encourage audience participation. The genre often features a mix of percussion instruments such as the darbuka and bendir, alongside stringed instruments like the oud, qanun, and violin, as well as the Libyan bagpipe known as the zokra.

The lyrics typically explore themes of daily life, love, social issues, and cultural pride, making it both a form of entertainment and a vehicle for storytelling and social commentary. Unlike more classical genres such as Malouf, Chaabi is generally more accessible and dance-oriented, frequently performed at weddings, festivals, and communal gatherings.

=== Gheita ===
Gheita music is a traditional musical form that originated primarily in the Libyan city of Benghazi. It is considered one of the most prominent styles of Libyan popular music, alongside Jar Suwahli and Mirskaawi. This style should not be confused with the ghaita (or rhaita) instrument found in North African and Andalusi musical traditions; in the Libyan context, Gheita refers both to a fast-paced musical genre and to a traditional instrument bearing the same name. Despite sharing the term, the musical style and the instrument are distinct and unrelated in their origins and use.

Gheita is known for its intensely fast and aggressive rhythm, often compared to American hard rock, though the instruments and rhythmic structures are entirely different. It is a male-dominated genre, traditionally performed exclusively by young men, with no participation from women. Gheita music plays a central role in major public festivities, especially weddings and national celebrations such as sporting victories.

=== Mirskaawi ===
Mirskaawi (Arabic: المرسكاوي) is a traditional popular music form native to eastern Libya, particularly prominent in cities such as Benghazi, Al-Bayda, and Derna. Some believe its origin lies in the southern town of Murzuq, with the name deriving from "Murzuqawi." Others, including Libyan musicologist Tariq al-Hassi, suggest that the genre has Andalusian roots, citing similarities with Andalusian music and proposing that "Mirskaawi" evolved from "Moriscawi," a Libyan Arabic adaptation of "Morisco"—the term for Andalusian Muslims who fled to North Africa after the fall of al-Andalus.

Mirskaawi typically features a local maqam and opens with a vocal prelude resembling a mawwāl, supported by instrumental accompaniment known as diwan. Songs often conclude with a fast-paced rhythmic flourish called tabrouila, which may use the same musical theme or introduce a new one, often with a danceable rhythm. The music form is traditionally performed with local instruments and is known for its improvisational vocal style.

=== Jarr Suwahli ===
Jarr Suwahli (Arabic: جر السواحلي) is one of the oldest known musical traditions in Libya, originating along the Libyan coastline. The name derives from two words: jarr, meaning "to pull" or "to trail," referring to lyrical lines that flow continuously, and suwahli, meaning "coastal," marking its birth along the shores of the Mediterranean. Its exact origins dates back centuries, making them difficult to pinpoint with historical precision.

Characterized by its free structure, both rhythmically and lyrically, Jarr Suwahli developed as an expressive, improvisational form that allowed for significant artistic freedom. This openness made it especially appealing to younger generations. The lyrics are typically romantic or celebratory in nature, revolving around themes of love, longing, and social joy—often performed at weddings or festive gatherings. Poetic lines tend to range from medium to extended in length, providing performers with a flexible narrative structure suited for both personal expression and communal performance.

The traditional instrumentation of Jarr Suwahli includes the oud, ney or zamara, darbouka, bendir, and qanun. In the 20th century, particularly from the mid-century onward, the genre evolved to incorporate modern instruments such as the keyboard, guitar, violin, and accordion. These additions reflected a broader trend of stylistic fusion and a willingness to modernize while retaining the genre's emotional and rhythmic core.

Over time, it served as the foundation for several strands of modern Libyan popular music. In the late 1960s, Libyan musician Ahmed Fakroun gained recognition for fusing Jarr Suwahli with rock influences, helping define a new wave of youth music. By the 1970s and 1980s, this modernized form, sometimes referred to simply as Libyan free music, spread to Egypt, where it came to be known as musiqa shababiyya ("youth music"). Though initially dismissed as lowbrow or "declining music" (musiqa habita), it quickly gained popularity across the Arab world.

Prominent Libyan artists such as Hamid Al Shaeri and Ibrahim Fahmi played key roles in exporting this genre to Egypt, contributing to its pan-Arab evolution. From these roots also emerged a sub-style known as Libyan country music (musiqa rifiyya), marked by simple lyrics and melodies, continuing the tradition of accessibility and emotional immediacy that defines Jarr Suwahli.

=== Zamzamat ===
Zamzamat (Arabic: الزمزامات) refers to a traditional form of Libyan women's vocal music, often described as “Libyan female songs” or “women’s anthems.” Predominantly performed at social occasions and weddings, Zamzamat songs typically feature lyrical themes of love, celebration, and social customs, accompanied by simple rhythmic patterns played on traditional instruments such as hand drums (duff).

Historical evidence places the emergence of Zamzamat in the early 20th century. The tradition is believed to have started around 1919, reportedly to celebrate the return of a government minister. Esteemed Libyan artist Mokhtar Al-Aswad, drawing on sources such as the Yawmiyyat Al-Faqih Hassan (Diaries of Jurist Hassan), explains that early Zamzamat performers like Kamila Al-Makhla and her blind sister preserved songs once recited by Malouf music masters in cultural hubs such as the Khouja Hotel. The genre flourished through generations, supported by prominent musicians and singers including Muhammad Al-Sayyadi, a renowned Maqruna player, and singers like Aisha Al-Fizika, Mama Nissa, and Khadija Al-Funsha (widely known as Warda Al-Libiya).

Zamzamat is primarily associated with Tripoli. Their performances are characterized by collective female participation, with singers often improvising verses that praise the bride's virtues, celebrate the groom's qualities, or express affectionate social commentary. These performances are characterized by rhythmic ululations accompanied by hand clapping and drumbeats, often continuing throughout the wedding festivities until the arrival of the groom's family. The Zamzamat tradition is distinctive for its exclusive female participation, reflecting local customs that segregate men and women during such events. Male musical ensembles typically perform separate repertoires such as nuba and Malouf.

In eastern Libya, a similar tradition known as Darbakat (named after the darbuka drum they accompany themselves with) exists. Darbakat share many stylistic and functional similarities with Zamzamat. One of the most famous darbakat singers is Khadija Al-Founsha, widely recognized and celebrated in Benghazi, along with many other notable performers from the region. Their singing typically ranges from a slow, mournful mawwal-style prelude to faster-paced sections called nuba, reflecting a complex and expressive musical form.

=== Shetawi ===
Shetawi is an ancient Libyan musical art form that relies primarily on rhythm. Traditionally, no musical instruments were used; instead, the hands served as percussion through clapping. In the past century, however, instruments such as the darbuka and zamara have been introduced. The rhythm begins softly and lightly, much like gentle raindrops, and then escalates into a fast and powerful beat, resembling a torrential downpour that drowns out all other sounds. This is where the name Shetawi originates, as it is derived from shitaʼ, meaning "winter". It is generally performed on joyful occasions by both men and women and is especially associated with the city of Al-Bayda in eastern Libya.

=== Majrouda ===
Majrouda (Arabic: المجرودة) is a traditional Libyan folk poetry performance predominantly found in social celebrations such as weddings and other joyous occasions. It involves a male poet (majrad) reciting verses accompanied by a chorus of men who repeat key lines and provide rhythmic clapping. A woman, known as the hijala, stands silently before the poet, attentively listening and subtly dancing to the melody.

The name Majrouda derives from the Arabic root meaning "stripped" or "bare," reflecting its poetic style of brevity and simplicity. Unlike more elaborate poetic forms, Majrouda features short, direct verses with a strong emotional focus, often narrating personal tales of lost love and sorrow.

=== Dhammat qasha ===
Dhammat qasha ("A Straw's Grip") is a colloquial and popular musical form among Libyans, particularly associated with the Jabal al-Akhdar region. The performance is characterized by a relatively loud vocal delivery with a deep, dark-leaning tone. The singer (al-ghannāy) typically begins with the second hemistich of the poetic verse, repeating it multiple times before returning to the first hemistich, which is also repeated. dhammat qasha is noted for its eloquence, conciseness, and ability to convey profound meanings through a very limited number of words. It often relies on ambiguity or riddle-like phrasing, requiring interpretive effort to fully grasp the meaning.

=== Tuareg music ===
The Tuareg in southern Libya have their own distinctive folk music. In their culture, women are usually the musicians. They play the anzad, a one-stringed violin with a unique sound, and use different types of drums to create rhythm. Their music often accompanies social gatherings, storytelling, and important ceremonies, making it an important part of Tuareg life and culture.

== Vocal Tradition ==
Contemporary Libyan singing bears strong resemblance to vocal styles found throughout the rest of the Arab world, in that it combines both authenticity and modernity simultaneously. Traditional and folk singing, passed down through generations, continues to be practiced in numerous religious, national, and social occasions. Alongside these, Tarablusi singing (al-ghināʾ al-Ṭarābulsi) emerged in the city of Tripoli in the late 19th century. It was developed by a group of musical enthusiasts influenced by Levantine and Egyptian styles of classical Arabic music (ṭarab).

=== History ===
Libyan singing witnessed significant growth following the establishment of the national radio station in the mid-1950s. Alongside earlier styles, a new form of modern youth-oriented singing emerged in the early 1970s, characterized by the use of electronic instruments and advanced sound recording technologies. This genre reached the height of its popularity during the 1980s and 1990s, dominating the music scene and becoming one of the most commercially successful forms in Libya's cassette market. Despite its widespread popularity, this style did not achieve the same level of exposure on state-run radio and television stations as it did in other Arab countries through their media outlets and satellite channels.

=== Traditional Singing ===
Rooted in the rich Arabic musical heritage of the Maghreb and Andalusia, traditional Libyan singing is often linked to religious and social occasions, especially within Sufi communities. It features devotional chants, praise poetry, and Andalusian-influenced suites called malouf. These performances typically emphasize spiritual expression, with vocal styles that have been preserved through generations.

This singing tradition also includes devotional texts composed of chants, prayers, and spiritual teachings that are performed responsively, typically without instrumental accompaniment. Collective chanting, known as dhikr, involves the repetition of divine names in layered vocal parts that gradually increase in tempo and pitch. This practice is often accompanied by percussion instruments such as the baz (a small metal plate struck with a leather strap) and the zal (a pair of copper plates struck together to produce rhythmic effects).

Praise poems honoring the Prophet Muhammad or notable Sufi sheikhs are set to Arabic maqamat such as Rast, Bayati, Sikah, and Ajam. These are performed either a cappella or with traditional Arabic or folk instruments. Many of these melodies bear influences from Egyptian and Levantine musical traditions.

=== Popular (Folk) Singing ===
Folk songs in Libya have been passed down orally across generations and are closely tied to local customs and daily life. These songs often adapt over time, reflecting changes in society and culture, and remain a vital part of celebrations such as weddings and festivals.

=== Tarablusi Singing ===
Originating in Tripoli in the late 19th century, this genre differs substantially from traditional and folk singing in its artistic characteristics. Rooted in local poetic and rhythmic traditions, Tarablusi singing employs colloquial lyrics often focused on themes of love, description, and separation. It frequently utilizes classical Arabic maqamat and local rhythmic patterns performed with the Arabic orchestra (takht). Its rise was supported by radio broadcasts from the late Italian colonial period onward, and by musicians who recorded their work abroad to emulate the classical Levantine and Egyptian music scenes. Notable early figures include Muhammad ‘Abiyah, Ali al-Buni, Mohsen Dhafir, and others. The establishment of music departments within Libyan radio stations in Tripoli and Benghazi in the mid-20th century further propelled this genre's development and dissemination.

=== Modern Youth Singing ===
Since the 1970s, modern youth music in Libya has incorporated electronic instruments and modern production techniques. This style has grown in popularity through cassettes and other media but has had limited presence on radio and television. It represents a fusion of traditional elements with contemporary sounds, appealing especially to younger audiences.

== Instruments ==
=== Gasba ===
The gasba (ⵜⴰⵖⴰⵏⵉⵎⵜ Taghanimt in Tamazight) is a traditional North African wind instrument commonly found in Libya, particularly in the Nafusa Mountains. It closely resembles the ney, a flute-like instrument used in Arabic and Persian classical music. The gasba is typically crafted from a hollow tube of metal or reed (such as bamboo), with finger holes along its body. Sound is produced by blowing across the top edge, where the airstream breaks against the lip, generating vibration. Though unlike some similar flutes, it lacks a built-in whistle mechanism (fahlil).

The gasba is typically crafted from a hollow piece of metal or reed (ghab), with several holes pierced along its length. Sound is produced by blowing across the upper rim, where the air splits against the edge, creating a resonant tone. Unlike the fahlil (another regional wind instrument), the gasba does not contain a built-in whistle. It also lacks a rear thumb hole, which limits its tonal range to approximately seven notes.

Traditionally, the gasba is used in folk performances and ceremonial gatherings. In western Libya, it is often played in duet with the danga, a percussive instrument, forming a distinctive musical pairing that features prominently in local cultural expressions.

=== Darbuka ===
The darbuka is a traditional goblet-shaped drum widely used in Libyan music, particularly in coastal regions. It consists of a conical or hourglass-shaped ceramic body with a tightly stretched skin membrane over the top.

In Libya, ceramic darbukas are commonly played during weddings and celebratory events, especially in coastal cities. In the southern and central regions, wooden versions such as the dabbaba are more common. In Ghadames, a smaller-sized local variant known as the Andkallel or Ghadames darbuka is traditionally played by women vocalists during festive occasions. They come in three sizes: small, medium, and large. The player holds the drum in the left hand and strikes it with the right, a method that differs from the two-handed technique commonly used in other darbuka traditions.

The dabbaha is crafted from a solid almond or olive tree trunk segment, roughly 50–60 cm in length. A hollow cavity is carved inside, and both ends are sealed with goat skin stretched tightly over wooden frames and fastened with cords. These cords must be tightened before each performance, and in some regions, a piece of date fruit is placed between the skin and the wood to increase tension through heat, producing a warmer resonance. The instrument is often slung over the left shoulder using a leather strap, allowing the performer to dance while playing, particularly in ensemble settings like the Zakkar troupe, which typically includes two dabbaha drummers and one zokra player (Libyan bagpipe).

In many regions, the ceramic darbuka is played by heating the membrane before performance to improve sound quality. Some musicians even place a small piece of date fruit on the membrane's surface to emulate the deep, resonant tone of the dabbaha.

=== Bendir ===
The bendir is a traditional frame drum widely used in Amazigh and Libyan folk music. It consists of a circular wooden frame approximately 40 cm in diameter, with a hole along the rim through which the player inserts the left thumb for support. One side of the frame is covered with stretched goatskin, and the interior often contains one or two gut strings (traditionally made from animal intestines) stretched across the back of the membrane. These strings vibrate when struck, producing a buzzing or resonant sound characteristic of the instrument.

The bendir is one of the primary instruments for maintaining rhythm in Libyan music, especially in Amazigh folk traditions. It also plays a prominent role in religious and spiritual music, including hadra (Sufi ceremonial music), and is frequently used in group performances, solo accompaniment, and ritual practices.

=== Danga ===
The danga (Arabic: الدنقة) is a traditional Libyan percussion instrument, considered a smaller counterpart to the nūba drum. The instrument is typically slung over the performer's left shoulder and played using a curved stick, often made from the tazugart tree, to strike the drum's front face and produce the deep dum beat. Simultaneously, the player's other hand uses the fingers to tap out lighter rhythmic accents and ornamentations, known as takkāt, on the same surface.

The danga continues to be used in regions west and south of Tripoli, particularly in the Nafusa Mountains. It is commonly paired with the zokra in Zakkar ensembles.

Historically, the danga was also associated with the figure of Abu Sa'diyya, or "the masked man," a performer whose roots trace back to ancient African traditions. Abu Sa'diyya would roam through Libyan towns and villages during seasonal festivals, combining danga drumming with singing and dancing. This figure played a vital role in public celebrations, and his presence was both entertaining and ritualistic.

In Tripoli, the danga is still featured in performances of the Makariya parade, where it is played alongside shakshakat (metallic castanets or clappers) during festive public displays.

=== Zamara ===
The zamara, also known as the mizmar, is a traditional folk wind instrument with deep historical roots extending across the ancient Near East and parts of Eastern Europe. It has been documented by classical scholars such as Al-Farabi, who described various types of reed instruments in his 10th-century treatise Kitab al-Musiqa al-Kabir, dating back over a thousand years. In Libya, the zamara typically consists of two main parts: the primary pipe, or gasaba, which contains the finger holes, and a smaller reed called the balous, inserted into the main pipe. The player blows into the balous, causing its reed to vibrate and produce the characteristic sound of the instrument. By manipulating the finger holes, the musician varies the length of the air column within the pipe to change the pitch.

The technique of circular breathing is essential for zamara players, allowing them to maintain continuous sound by storing air in their cheeks and expelling it gradually while inhaling through the nose. This skill enables performances lasting over an hour, typically accompanying traditional songs and dances.

Various forms of the zamara exist in Libyan folk music, including single and double-pipe versions, with some featuring horn-like extensions designed to amplify the instrument's volume. Despite the variations, all are made from natural materials using methods that have remained largely unchanged for millennia. The sound produced aligns closely with the Arabic quarter-tone scale, although the limited number of finger holes generally restricts melodies to a six-note range, suitable for the folk tunes of the region.

=== Zokra ===
The zokra (also known locally as tazkart) is a traditional Libyan aerophone, believed to date back to the 17th century. Made primarily from reed (qasab al-ghab), it is fitted with a single-reed mouthpiece known as the balous. The zokra exists in both single and double-pipe forms, and in certain variations, most notably the maqrunah, a goatskin airbag is attached, functioning similarly to the reservoir of a bagpipe. This allows the performer to maintain a continuous tone while using fingerholes on the reed pipes to produce melodic variations.

The instrument is commonly paired with the dabbaha drums in a three-part ensemble known as the zkar, a performance tradition widely used in Libyan weddings, especially along the coastal regions and in the Nafusa Mountains. The zokra is played at festive events including weddings, Mawlid, and traditional folk dances, particularly in Derna, Al-Bayda, Kufra, and Murzuk, as well as other parts of eastern and central Libya.

Traditionally, zokras are crafted from two equal-length reed pipes bound together with goatskin, typically filali hide. In some types, particularly the maqrunah, cattle horns are affixed to the ends of the pipes to enhance acoustic resonance. The number of fingerholes, usually four or five, determines the tonal range and the specific maqam that can be played. The instrument is capable of producing modes such as bayati, rast, and saba, aligning it with the broader but microtonally nuanced Arabic modal system. To play, the musician inserts the balous into the mouth and uses circular breathing to maintain continuous airflow, while the index, middle, and ring fingers manipulate the holes to generate melodic variation.

=== Ghaita ===
The ghaita is a traditional wind instrument similar to the zurna, played by blowing into a pair of reed tubes attached to a wooden body. It is widely used in popular music traditions across northern Iraq, Turkey, Syria, and southern Algeria. The name is believed to be of Persian origin, meaning “deep-toned flute.” Known for its extremely loud and penetrating sound, the ghaita is typically paired with drums, forming a dynamic duo often featured in open-air celebrations, weddings, and folk dances, which are commonly performed to its sound.

=== Anzad ===
The anzad is a traditional bowed single-string instrument used by the Tuareg people of the Sahara region in North Africa. It is primarily played by women and serves an important role in Tuareg cultural and musical traditions.

The instrument's body is typically crafted from a hollowed-out gourd, which is then covered with animal skin to form a resonant soundboard. A single horsehair string is stretched from the neck to the base of the instrument, passing over a distinctive bridge made of two wooden slats joined in the shape of a cross. The accompanying bow, also strung with horsehair, is used to produce a sustained, nasal tone that characterizes the anzad's sound.

== Contemporary Music ==
Contemporary Libyan music has experienced a dynamic evolution, led by a new generation of artists who fuse traditional sounds with modern global genres such as trap, hip-hop, and electronic music.

=== Reggae ===
Reggae music, though originally from Jamaica, gained unexpected popularity in Libya beginning in the 1970s. During this period of political tension and shifting cultural awareness, Libyan musicians began fusing reggae's characteristic offbeat rhythms with traditional Libyan instruments and Arabic musical scales, resulting in a distinct local variation of the genre. The themes of resistance, unity, and freedom commonly found in reggae resonated strongly with Libyan youth, particularly during the Gaddafi era, when music became an outlet for subtle dissent and political expression.

Ibrahim Hesnawi, often referred to as the "Father of Libyan Reggae," is one of the genre's most prominent figures. Other notable contributors include Ahmed Ben Ali, Najib Alhoush, Tarek Al-Najeh, Jamal Abd Al-Qadder, Alneeda Group, The White Birds Band, and Shahd. Even after the country's political transformations, Libyan reggae continues to serve as a powerful form of artistic and social expression. International labels such as Habibi Funk have recently helped bring wider attention to this uniquely Libyan musical form.

=== Funk, Pop, and Disco ===
Libya's funk scene, which emerged in the 1970s and 1980s, was heavily influenced by global musical trends of the era, particularly Western pop, disco, and synth-funk. Among its most prominent figures is Ahmed Fakroun, whose music blends Arabic melodies and Maghrebi rhythms with European electronic and funk styles. His albums, including Mots d’Amour and Awedny, gained international recognition, and he is widely regarded as one of Libya's most influential contemporary musicians.

Another significant contributor to Libya's modern music landscape is Hamid Al Shaeri, widely recognized for his influential role in Arabic pop music and as a pioneer of the Al-Jeel (جيل) genre. Emerging in the 1980s as a youth-oriented form of Arabic pop, Al-Jeel incorporated Western synth-pop, disco, and soft rock influences. Al Shaeri's work is characterized by electronic synthesizers, funk-inspired rhythms, and melodic Arabic vocals. Originally from Benghazi, Libya, he relocated to Cairo and became a central figure in the Arabic pop scene, shaping the sound of Arabic popular music through the 1980s and 1990s.

Cheb Arab is a Libyan singer who was active in Egypt during the 1990s. Known for his contributions to Arabic pop and electronic music, Cheb Arab blended contemporary sounds with regional influences and gained recognition within the Egyptian music industry.

Other artists, such as Najib Alhoush and The White Birds Band, also explored funk and soul styles, often incorporating reggae elements.

=== Hip-Hop and Rap ===
After the 2011 revolution, Libyan rap and hip-hop saw a noticeable rise in prominence, emerging as a powerful medium for youth expression and political commentary. Often produced in informal or underground settings due to limited infrastructure and censorship, the genre gave voice to a generation shaped by conflict, displacement, and rapid social change. Artists such as GAB, Ibn Thabit, along with others based in exile or within diaspora communities, have addressed themes like injustice, marginalization, identity, and resistance. Lyrics are typically performed in Darja (Libyan Arabic dialect), marked by a raw, unfiltered tone and direct political messaging. Hip-hop in Libya remains one of the most vital contemporary art forms for articulating dissent and navigating the complexities of post-revolutionary life.

=== Desert Blues ===
Desert blues is a prominent music genre among the Tuareg communities inhabiting the Saharan regions of North Africa, including southern Libya. Also known by names such as Assouf, Tishoumaren, Takamba, Tuareg Rock, and Saharan Rock, Desert Blues blends traditional Tuareg sounds with elements of rock and blues.

The name Tishoumaren itself stems from the French word chômeur, meaning unemployed. It is originally a slang term for young Tuareg men who migrated to urban centers in North and West Africa during the droughts of the 1970s. Forced to abandon traditional nomadic pastoralism, these youths shaped the genre into an expressive outlet for cultural pride, alienation, and defiance.

Musically, Desert Blues combines driving rock rhythms and blues influences with indigenous instrumentation. Traditional instruments such as the tende drum and the Malian lute are central, alongside electric guitars and modern percussion. Vocals are typically performed in the Tuareg Tamasheq language, emphasizing the genre's deep roots in Tuareg identity.

Desert Blues enjoys popularity not only in Libya's southern Sahara but also in Algeria, Niger, Mali, and Burkina Faso, marking it as a pan-Saharan cultural phenomenon.

=== Electronic and Experimental Fusion ===
In recent years, Libyan music has witnessed a growing trend of remixing and electronic reinterpretation of traditional songs. DJs and producers have been incorporating classic folk melodies, traditional tunes, and regional rhythms into modern electronic genres by layering them with synths, house, techno, and trap beats. These remixes often sample traditional instruments such as the oud and percussion patterns, blending them with contemporary production techniques to create dance-oriented tracks that retain a distinctively Libyan character.

This fusion has helped bridge generational gaps by making traditional music accessible to younger audiences and has gained traction both within Libya and among the Libyan diaspora through social media and streaming platforms.

== Music Festivals ==
Libyan music festivals play an important role in preserving and showcasing the country's diverse musical heritage, encompassing both Amazigh and Arab traditions. These festivals provide a platform for local artists, musicians, and artisans, fostering cultural exchange, promoting traditional arts, and encouraging domestic and international tourism.

=== Benghazi Summer Festival ===
The Benghazi Summer Festival is a contemporary cultural and music festival held in Benghazi, Libya. After a 15-year hiatus due to the country's political instability, the festival returned in August 2024, symbolizing a broader effort to revive cultural life in eastern Libya.

The 2024 edition, organized by the Ajyalna Foundation and directed by Libyan music journalist Ahmed Kwfiya, featured over 27 artists from across the Arab world and North Africa. Performers included Egyptian rapper Wegz, Moroccan rapper ElGrandeToto, Tunisian artist Samara, and Lebanese pop singer Wael Jassar. Prominent Libyan musicians such as Mansour Anaoun, Ka7la, Akhras, and Fares Saber also performed.

The festival featured a blend of genres, including hip-hop, pop, Arabic trap, and traditional Libyan music. Alongside the concerts, the event also hosted beach volleyball matches, e-sports competitions, a Russian circus, cultural exhibitions, and literary showcases. It is regarded as a significant milestone in the cultural revitalization of Libya, offering a platform for both emerging and established artists and signaling a renewed public interest in music and artistic expression post-2011.

=== Ghat Festival ===
The Ghat Festival, held annually in December, is one of Libya's most prominent cultural events. It takes place in the town of Ghat, located in the southwestern Fezzan region near the Algerian border. The festival celebrates Tuareg culture, which is dominant in the area, and features traditional music, dance, camel racing, and exhibitions of local crafts. One of its defining elements is the performance of Desert blues music, making the festival a significant venue for this genre's expression and preservation.

=== Ghadames Festival ===
The Ghadames Festival is a three-day international cultural celebration held annually in October or November in the historic oasis town of Ghadames, also known as the "Pearl of the Desert." It honors the traditions of the nomadic Tuareg and Amazigh communities that are integral to the region's cultural fabric.

Music and dance are central to the festival's cultural showcase. Performers clad in traditional attire fill the ancient alleys and courtyards of Ghadames's old town with call-and-response singing, accompanied by indigenous instruments like the zokra and dabbaha. These performances often take place during folk dances and camel or horse races held just outside the city walls.

The event draws both locals and international visitors, featuring communal singing, folkloric band performances, and musical processions that highlight the region's musical heritage.

=== Nalut Spring Festival ===
The three day Nalut Spring Festival is an annual cultural celebration held in the Amazigh-majority town of Nalut, in Libya's western Nafusa Mountains. The festival takes place in early spring and marks the seasonal transition from winter, serving as both a communal gathering and an assertion of local Amazigh identity. It features a variety of traditional activities, including horse racing, Amazigh music and dance, and exhibitions of local handicrafts. Musical performances often involve instruments like the bendir and zokra, with community dances such as the ahwash performed in the town's open spaces. Artisans display woven textiles, pottery, and silver jewelry, reinforcing Nalut's cultural continuity and artisanal heritage.

In the wake of Libya's 2011 revolution, the festival has taken on renewed importance as a symbol of cultural resilience and regional pride, reflecting the community's deep connection to its historical traditions and natural rhythms.

=== Zuwarah Awessu Festival ===
The Awessu Festival is a traditional celebration held in Zuwarah, a coastal town in western Libya. Originally rooted in pre-Islamic sea rituals, the festival marks a period of renewal and spiritual cleansing. Participants, primarily from the local Amazigh community, traditionally take livestock and possessions into the sea for ritual bathing before sunrise, symbolizing purification and connection to ancestral heritage.

Over time, the festival has evolved into a broader cultural event. Contemporary celebrations feature sailing and swimming races, accompanied by performances of folk music and traditional dancing. Generous feasts showcasing local culinary traditions also play a central role in the festivities, attracting visitors and fostering community bonds.
