= Yeshiva of the Students of Paris =

Orthodox Yeshiva in France

- Type: Yeshiva
- Affiliations: Orthodox judaism
- Location: Paris, Île-de-France, France; 48.8793°N 2.3754°E

The Yeshiva of the Students of Paris (or the Hebrew Center for Study and Meditation) is a seminary of rabbinical studies (a yeshiva) that was founded in 1987 by the Rabbi Gerard Zyzek. His objective was the learning of the Jewish traditions and the Babylonian Talmud.

== History ==
=== The yeshiva in Strasbourg ===
The first "yeshiva of the students" was founded in Strasbourg, France, after de Six Day War, and the May 1968 events in France, as an initiative of the Rabbis Eliyahu Abitbol and Fernand Klapish. The Rabbi Abitbol, was the pupil of Lion Ashkenazi, later was the student of Rabbi Shlomo Wolbe, and the study mate of the Rabbi Yehezkel Bretler, the pupil of the Chazon Ish (Rabbi Avrohom Yeshaya Karelitz). At the request of the Rabbi Yaakov Yisroel Kanievsky, also named Steipler, the yeshiva was installed in France. The Rabbi Steipler helped the young French speaking talmudists who wished to travel to France, to form the necessary cadres to gather the Jews form northern Africa, who had been repatriated after the independence of Algeria. The yeshiva of the students in Strasbourg, during the 1970s and 1980s, formed from young idealist Jews, interested in the study of the Talmud.

=== The yeshiva in Paris ===
The first study room of the yeshiva in Paris, was installed in 1987, to teach the Talmud to the students. Over the years, the activity of the yeshiva grew, and it had to change its location several times. It was installed in the Marais quarter, between 1994 and 1995, in 10 Malta Street, between 1996 and 2002, before moving to 10 Cadet Street, where it was between 2003 and 2015, together with the synagogue Adas Yereim, nowadays disappeared. In that same place, the yeshiva had lodging for the students. It left Cadet Street in 2015, and it moved to the 11 Henri-Murger Street. The yeshiva has again, since the autumn of 2018, provided housing for the students.

Since the beginning of the 21st century the educational staff has grown, with the participation of long term pupils, in the frame of the project: "School of teachers". The yeshiva promotes women's studies, through the courses of Stéphanie Klein. The teaching consists in the study of the Babylonian Talmud and the Chumash, together with the commentaries of Rashi, and the study of the works of the Maharal of Prague. The courses deal with the questions of society, according to rabbinical tradition, in a spirit of dialogue. At least once a year the yeshiva organizes a day of study with guest speakers. The yeshiva's annual gala includes several celebrities like the Chief Rabbi of France, Haim Korsia, and the singer Enrico Macias.
