= Cheikh Raymond =

Algerian Jewish musician

Cheikh Raymond Leyris
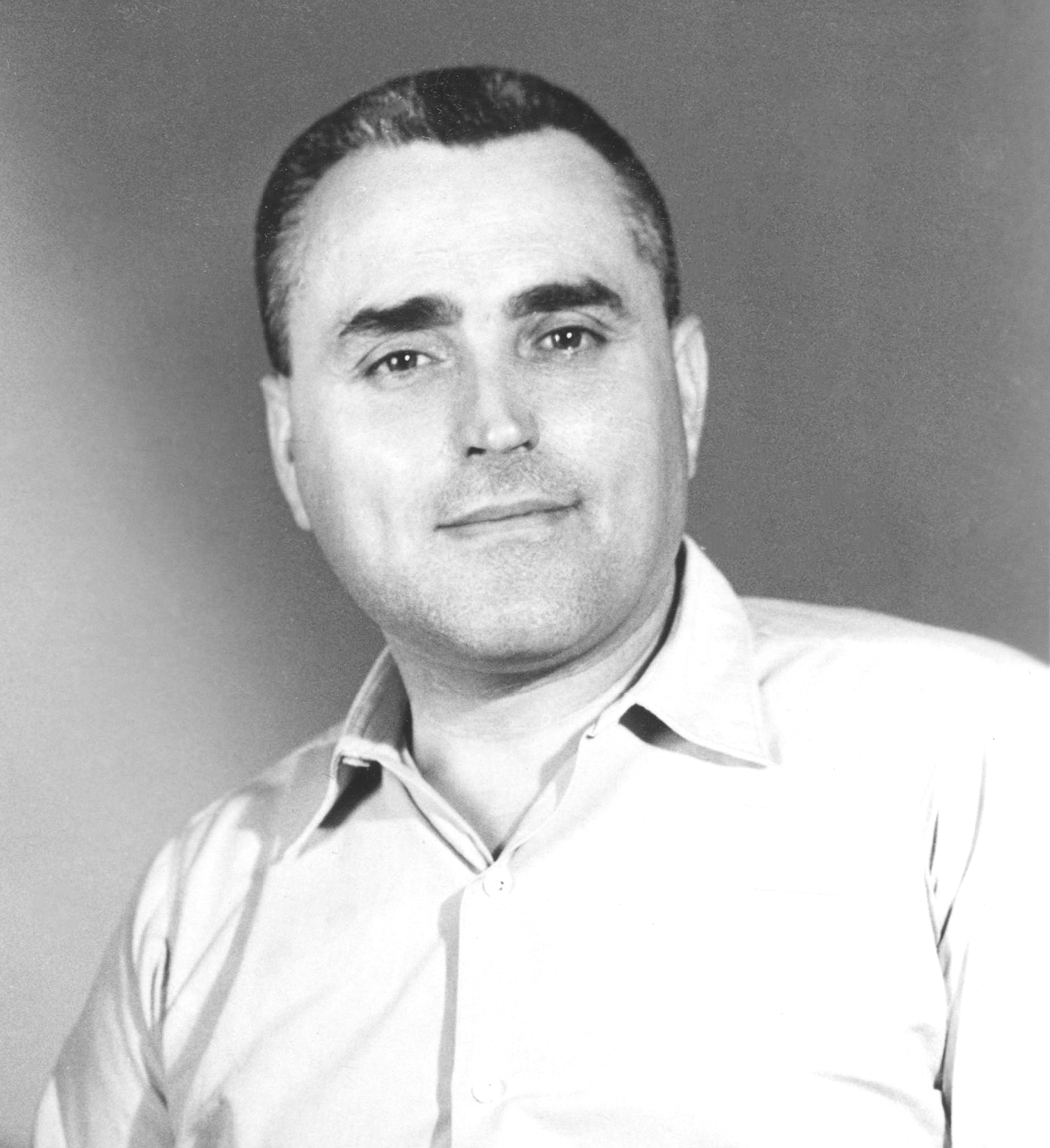

Background information
- Born: July 12, 1912; Batna, Algeria
- Died: June 22, 1961 (age 48) Constantine, Algeria
- Instrument: Oud

Raymond Leyris better known as Cheikh Raymond, was an Algerian Jewish musician. He specialized in Andalusian music of Eastern Algeria (known as malouf) and was an expert virtuoso player of oud (the Andalusian lute) and singer with an extensive vocal range and widely respected by both Jews and Muslims and given the title of Cheikh (elder).

== Life ==
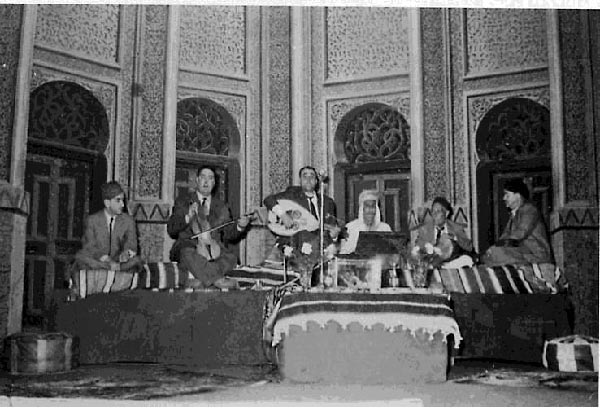
Cheikh Raymond Leyris playing with his Oud (in the middle)

Cheikh Raymond's father was a Chaoui Jew from Batna, and his mother a French citizen. He was abandoned by his mother during World War I after his father was killed. He was adopted by a very poor Jewish Algerian family from Constantine.

He studied the musical style of Arab-Andalusia or "Malouf" music under the guidance of the greats of Algerian music like Cheikh Chakleb and Cheikh Abdelkrim Bestandji and launched a famous musical career establishing his own "Cheikh Raymond orchestra" and between 1956 and 1961 releasing more than thirty albums in addition to some singles.

Members of his orchestra included:

- Sylvain Ghrenassia (an expert violinist)
- Nathan Bentari
- Haim Benbala
- Larbi Benamri
- Gaston Ghrenassia (later the renowned international singer Enrico Macias).

The young Gaston joined the orchestra at the age of 15 encouraged by his father Sylvain. Gaston was soon dubbed "le petit Enrico" by the band, with Gaston eventually adopting it as his stage name during his musical career in France. Gaston soon married Cheikh Raymond's own daughter Suzy.

Cheikh Raymond was assassinated on 22 June 1961 by a bullet in the neck, while he was shopping in Constantine's Souk El Asser (place Négrier) during the Algerian War of Independence. Some believe that his death had an impact on the decision for a great number of the Jewish Algerians (including Gaston and Suzy) to emigrate to France on the eve of Algerian independence.

== Legacy ==
Cheikh Raymond is still remembered today as an emblem of Malouf music and a martyr for the Jewish people originating from Algeria.
