= Forward Music =

Forward Music S.A.L.
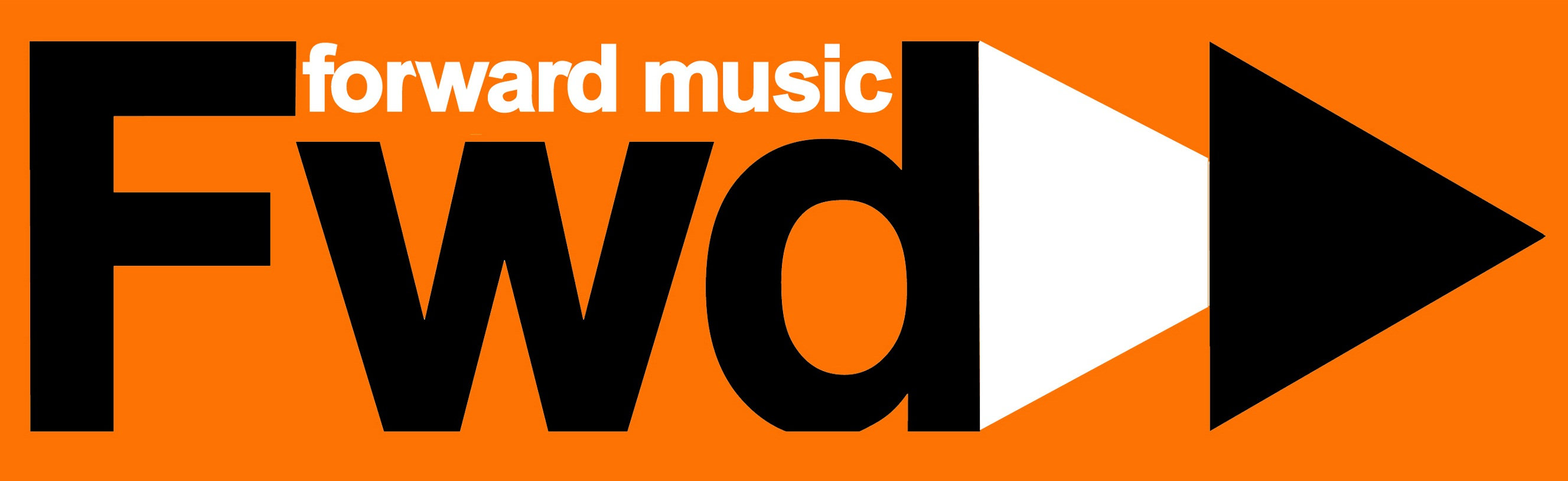
- Company type: Private
- Industry: Music entertainment
- Founded: 2001
- Headquarters: Beirut, Lebanon
- Key people: Ghazi Abdel Baki
- Website: forwardmusic.net

Forward Music is a Lebanon based independent record label specializing in World Music.

== History ==
Forward Music was established in 2001 by Ghazi Abdel Baki as a music label. Today, Forward Music is an independent label that produces and distributes the work of several musicians and singers in the Middle East.

In 2007, one of Forward Music's projects, "Al Muwashahat", received The BBC Awards for world music .

In October 2010, Forward Music acquired 13 album licenses from the record label Incognito, expanding its music catalogue.

Later, In 2011, Forward Music opened its concert venue in Beirut: The Democratic republic of Music (DRM). DRM hosted 300 concerts in the span of 3 years with artists such as: Stanley Jordan, Tony Allen (musician), Henri Texier, Souad Massi, The Herbaliser, Ilham al-Madfai, Joey DeFrancesco, and others including the label's artists and musicians from Syria, Egypt, Tunisia, Jordan, Iraq, and Lebanon.

== List of current artists ==
- Charbel Rouhana
- Lena Chamamyan
- Ghazi Abdel Baki
- Mustafa Said

== Discography ==
- Watad, Ghazi Abdel Baki
- Ila Mata, Charbel Rouhana
- Handmade, Charbel Rouhana
- Arabtango, Soumaya Baalbaki
- Rubaiyat El Khayyam, Mustafa Said
- "Ghazi Abdel Baki LIVE", Ghazi Abdel Baki
- Beirut Good Vibes - Vol.1, Various
- Handmade DVD, Charbel Rouhana
- Darwish, Issa Ghandour and the Madina Band
- The Last Communique, Ghazi Abdel Baki
- Doux Zen, Charbel Rouhana
- The Collection, Lena Chamamyan
- Hal Asmar Elone, Lena Chamamyan
- Shamat, Lena Chamamyan
- Cotton Candy, Lena Chamamyan
- Communique # 1, Ghazi Abdel Baki
- Madinatuna, Paul Salem
- Oyoun el Bakar, Ziyad Sahhab
- World Music From Lebanon - Vol.1 (3 CD box set), Various
- We Live, Various
- Dangerous, Charbel Rouhana
- Faces, Ibrahim Jaber Gros Bras
- Sourat Trait d'Union, Charbel Rouhana
- Communique # 2, Ghazi Abdel Baki
- Keep On Singing, Ziyad Sahhab
- World Music From Lebanon - Vol.2 (2 CD box set), Various
- World Music From Lebanon - Vol.3 (2 CD box set), Various
- Fareeq ElAtrash, Fareeq El Atrash
- Silent Wave, Ziad Al-Ahmadieh
- Bilbal, Ziad Al-Ahmadieh
- Beyond Traditions, Ziad Al-Ahmadieh
- Things That I Miss, Hazem Shaheen
- Hewar, Hewar
- El Aysh Wel Melh, Masar
- The Taqalid Series (6 CD box set), Various
- Asil, Asil Ensemble & Mustafa Said
- The Annunciation, Nida Abou Mrad & The Arabic Classical Ensemble
- Wisal, Nida Abou Mrad &The Arabic Classical Ensemble
- Wasalat, Nida Abou Mrad &The Arabic Classical Ensemble
- Tajwid, Sheikh Salah Yammout
- Insan, Twais
- Taqalid Sampler, Various
- Khameer, Basel Rajoub
