= Ahmed Fakroun =

Libyan singer and songwriter

Ahmed Fakroun أحمد فكرون
- Born: 1953 (age 72–73)
- Origin: Benghazi, Libya
- Genres: Libyan, Arabic

Ahmed Fakroun (Arabic: أحمد فكرون; born 1953) is a singer and songwriter from Benghazi, Libya. He is a pioneer of modern Arabic World Music.

John Storm Roberts, of Original Music, AllMusic, wrote that among raï singers, the pop-oriented Ahmed Fakroun stands out on two grounds. First, he is influenced by Europop and French art rock, not just the generalized rock of the others. Second, he is a multi-instrumentalist in both traditions as well as a singer. He plays bouzouki-like saz, mandol and darbouka drum, as well as guitar, bass guitar and keyboards. Sometimes he seems overly crossover-oriented: but on form, his crossover deepens into telling biculturalism. It has also been noted that Fakroun was a pioneer in bringing disco music to raï.

== Discography ==
- Awedni, produced by Tommy Vance, 1973 London, UK (distributed by Wadny Recordi, Columbia Records, Polydor France, 1977)
- Nisyan, arranged by Nicolas Vangelis & Ahmed Fakroun, 1977, Italy (distributed by Shawara Al Madina, recorded With Enid at Lodge Studio, and mixed at Edin studio London)
- Yumma, 1978, Italy (Recorded at IAF Studio)
- Shibacik (with Mark Harris), 1979, Italy
- Soleil Soleil (with Jhon Ferre), 1983 / 1984, Paris
- You Son (Prince Language Edit).
- Love Words (aka Mots D'amour), 1987, Paris (recorded in Paris at Studio des Dame and Garage Studios)
- Intithar (recorded at Garage Studios, Paris)
- Sinbad (Released by Fakrounmusic, recorded in Libya)
- Salma (Released by Fakrounmusic, recorded in Libya)

== Biography ==
Fakroun has collaborated with international producers including Tommy Vance, Papathanassiou Vangelis, Nicholas Nicorelli, Riccardo Sinigaglia, Group classical rock Enid, Jean Ferre, Jean-Baptiste Mondino and Mark Harris.

An early childhood fascination with rhythmic harmony led him to choose the Fender Precision Electric Bass as his first instrument. This was soon accompanied with harmonica, guitar, and piano, as well as traditional stringed instruments such as oud, mandola and saz.

From the very beginning, he listened intently to music from every corner of the planet - from the Libyan desert and the temples of India to the Scottish highlands, streets of Paris, London, and New York - absorbing a rich variety of influences that would lead to his unique, personal style. His first band, formed in 1970 in Benghazi, played extensively at local school dances and events. Then, in England for five years of upper school, he made his first studio recordings with Tommy Vance, a producer for Radio Capital and the BBC. Joined by three English musicians, Ahmed started performing widely throughout England. Ahmed continued his pursuit of musical and cultural understanding and harmonizing of the world's heritages, returning to his homeland with the hit single - "Wadny (Promise me) " and "Nojoum Al Layl (Night Stars) " - that launched him to instant stardom in the Arab world. He was soon back in Europe, signing contracts with Italy's Ricordi label, the Polydor/Phonogram label (for whom he recorded his second single) and the Venezuela branch of the Columbia label. The single "Soleil Soleil" recorded with the Bain Douche Paris dic label delivered a major break for his career.

During Ahmed's sojourn in Paris, promoted with a videoclip produced by Jean Baptiste Mondino and starring popular comedian Coluche (winner of a César in 1984) - which took off in France and many other European countries, winner of the festival youth in 1986 in Morocco. Ahmed Fakroun has been producing and marketing new material on his own for many years now from his home studio.

In 2009, Fakroun released the 12" "Drago" (Claremont 56, CS56011) with two remixes, a collaboration with Mudd (Paul Murphy).
