= Venez tous mes amis! =

Studio album by Enrico Macias
- Released: 2012
- Recorded: 2012
- Genre: Traditional, ethnic, world music
- Label: AZ, Universal

Enrico Macias chronology
| Voyage d'une mélodie (2011) | Venez tous mes amis! (2012) |

Venez tous mes amis! is a compilation album of 17 songs by French singer of Jewish Algerian origin Enrico Macias in duo collaborations with other artists. It is in celebration of 50 years of a musical career in France and internationally.

15 are well-known Enrico Macias hits, and two are special new songs for the album

- "Ces etrangers": a new song written for Enrico Macias' album by Bruno Maman, and sang as a duo with Erico Macias
- "L'Algerie": a song by Serge Lama, that Enrico Macias chose to sing as a duo with the author as a tribute to his native country Algeria.

== Track listing ==
1. "Adieu mon pays" (3:12) – with Cali
2. "Le Mendiant de l'amour" (2:42) – with Mikael Miro
3. "Les Filles de mon pays" (3:00) – with Dany Brillant
4. "Les Gens du Nord" (3:20) – with Carla Bruni
5. "Oranges amères" (3:27) – with Corneille
6. "L'Oriental" (3:47) – with Khaled
7. "Paris tu m'as pris dans tes bras" (2:42) – with Sofia Essaidi
8. "Aux talons de ses souliers" (3:12) – with Riff Cohen
9. "Sans voir le jour" (3:49) – with Gérard Darmon
10. "Dis-moi ce qui ne va pas" (3:07) – with Natasha Saint Pier
11. "Il reste aujourd'hui (venez tous mes amis)" (2:23) – with Cabra Casay
12. "Oumparere" (2:42) – with Dani
13. "Ces etrangers" (3:23) – with Bruno Maman
14. "Mon histoire c'est ton histoire" (2:32) – with Toma
15. "L'Algérie" (4:03)
16. "Mon cœur d'attache" (3:40) – with Liane Foly
17. "J'ai perdu 25 kilos" (2:15) – with Valérie Lemercier

== Charts ==
| Chart (2012) | Peak position |
|---|---|
| Ultratop 40 Belgian Albums Chart (Wallonia) | 75 |
| French Albums Chart | 39 |
