= Mirskaawi =

Mirskaawi (Arabic: المرسكاوي) is a type of Libyan popular music widespread in eastern Libya, particularly in Benghazi, Al-Bayda, and Derna.

== Origin ==
Mirskaawi is believed by many Libyans to have originated in the southern oasis town of Murzuk, from which its name was allegedly derived. The term Murzuqawi is said to have evolved into Mirskaawi over time. This etymology is supported by the late Libyan singer and performer Mohamed Marshan, who maintained that the style was rooted in local southern traditions.

However, an alternative theory is proposed by Libyan musicologist Tariq al-Hassi, who argues that Mirskaawi is in fact of Andalusian origin. He bases this claim on two primary points. First is the strong similarity between the structure and modal characteristics of Mirskaawi and those of traditional Andalusian music. Second is a linguistic connection between Mirskaawi and the term Moriscos, the Muslim Andalusians who were expelled from Iberia and fled to North Africa after the fall of al-Andalus. According to al-Hassi, Mirskaawi is a Libyan vernacular evolution of Moriscawi, meaning "Morisco."

== Components ==
Mirskaawi songs were traditionally performed with a local melody based on a well-known maqam (musical mode).The music is distinguished by two non-organic elements that shape its structure. The first resembles the Arabic mawāl at the introduction and is accompanied by the diwan music, which is the scale upon which the main melodic framework is built and prepares the singer to enter the main song. The second element is popularly known as the tabrawila, a rapid rhythmic movement occurring at the end of the song within the original diwan or sometimes a different diwan. This movement carries a dance rhythm that leads to the final resolution of the song.

== Notable Singers ==
Among the most famous performers of this musical style in Libya, specifically from the city of Benghazi, are: Ali Al-Jahani, known as “Ali Wika”; Abduljalil Al-Qandouz, known as “Abduljalil Al-Hetch”; Khadija Al-Founsha, nicknamed “Warda Al-Libiya” (The Libyan Rose); Sayyid Boumediene, known as “Shadi Al-Jabal”; Ibrahim Al-Safi; Ahmeida Bonqta; and Mahdi Al-Barasi.

== See also ==
- Libya
- Arabic music
- Arabic pop music
