= Mizwad =

North African wind instrument

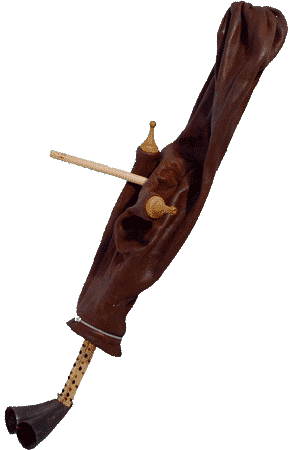
Mizwad

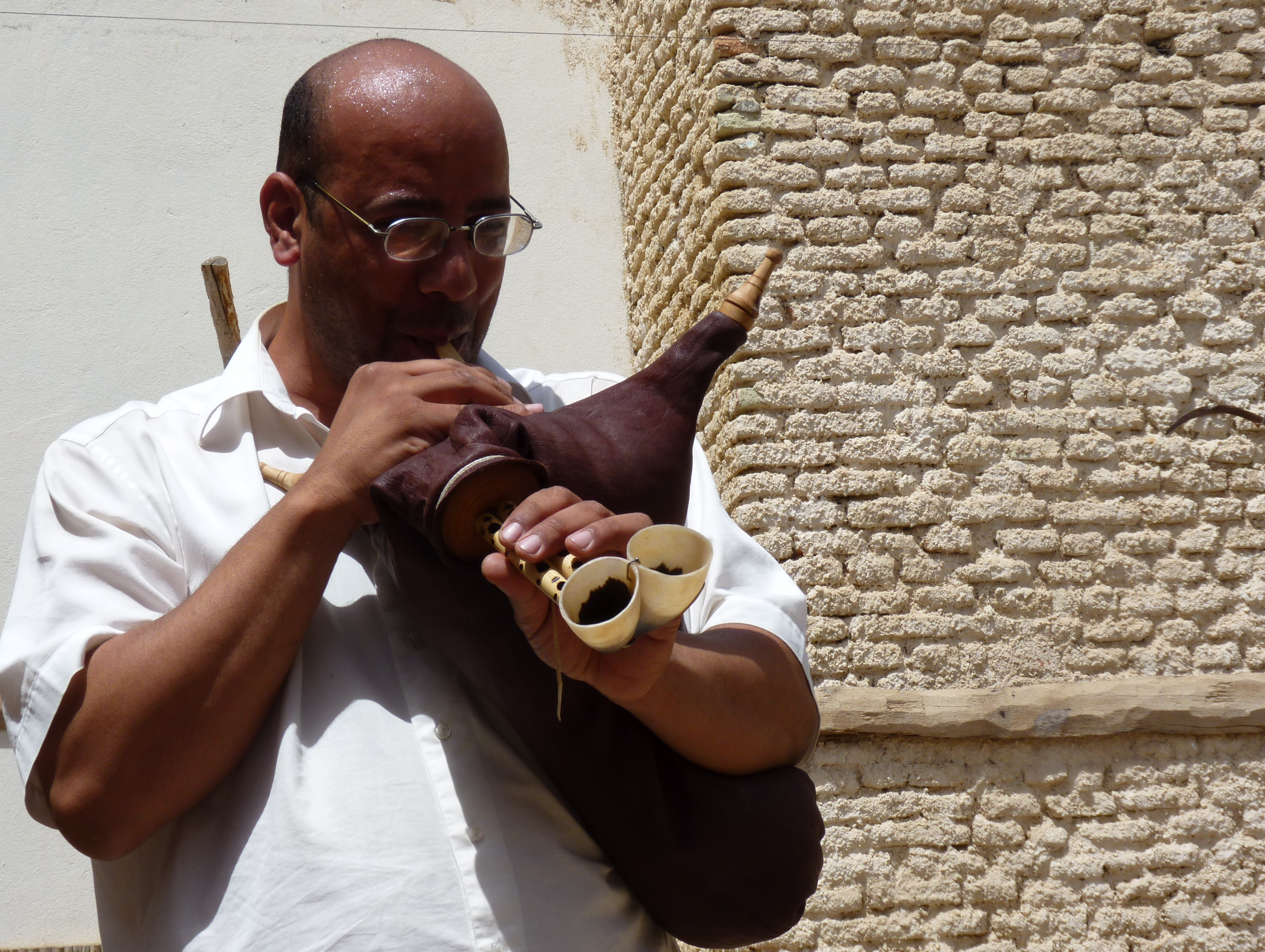

The Mezoued Tunisian Arabic : مِزْود; plural مَزاود mazāwid, literally "sack," “bag,” or “food pouch”) is a type of bagpipes played in Tunisia, The instrument consists of a skin bag made from ewe's leather, with a joined double-chanter, terminating in two cow horns, similar to a hornpipe (instrument).This instrument is played with a single-reed.

The ethnomusicologist Anthony Baines stated that the term "zukra" is also used for this instrument. Bagpipe enthusiast, Oliver Seeler, states that this connection is incorrect. While the zukra may be similar, it is instead a wind instrument in Libya, similar to the mezoued.

Mezoued is a popular type of traditional music in Tunisia which incorporates a type of North African drum called the darbouka as well as the mezoued. This music was originally considered the music of the countryside and the working class. It is often played at weddings and formal parties, and it also has its own traditional dances which are said to make people enter a trance-like state.

Mezoued is one of the most popular music genres in Tunisia and is played along with the drum.

== See also ==
- Habbān
- Mezoued
- Erke
