= Juanito (singer) =

French singer

Juanito (born Jean Claude Safrana; 1936 in Tunisia) is a French singer of Algerian descent who was popular in Turkey during the 1960s.

Juanito went to Turkey with his orchestra "Los Alcarson" in 1965. His orchestra left three months later, but Juanito chose to stay in Turkey. During those years, translations of French songs called "arrangements" (aranjman) were very popular in Turkey. He gained popularity with "Arkadaşımın Aşkısın" (English: You're the love of my friend), which was a Turkish version of Enrico Macias's "La Femme de Mon Ami". Later, he sang several Turkish versions of popular French songs, mostly translated by Fecri Ebcioğlu and Ümit Yaşar Oğuzcan. He released several vinyl singles from Odeon. He left Turkey in 1971, after arrangements lost their popularity.

In 2000, his vinyl recordings were released in an album titled Canım Vatanım (English: My Dear Country). He also acted in the 1969 movie Tatlı Günler (English: Sweet days).
