= Voyage d'une mélodie =

2011 studio album by Enrico Macias

Studio album by Enrico Macias
- Released: 2011
- Recorded: 2011
- Genre: Traditional, ethnic, world music
- Label: Universal, Phantom

Enrico Macias chronology
Voyage d'une mélodie (2011)	Venez tous mes amis! (2012)

Voyage d'une mélodie, (Journey of a melody) is a 2011 multilingual album by the French singer of Jewish Algerian origin Enrico Macias, after five years of absence due to the death of his wife. The critically acclaimed album comprises music explorations by Macias into multiple cultures where he interprets songs in French, Spanish, Tamazight (Berber language), Arabic, Hebrew and Yiddish. There are a number of collaborations with artists as duets in the album including Idir, Yasmin Levy, Daniel Lévi, Théodore Bikel and Claude Zuffrieden. The album was partly produced by Socalled, partly by his son Jean-Claude Ghrenassia.

The release is in anticipation of the 50th anniversary of Enrico Macias' prosperous musical career. He promoted the album and interpreted songs on the French TV programme Vivement Dimanche on France 2.

== Track list ==
1. "Tu n'es pas seul au monde (4:05)
2. "Snitra" (2:48) - duet with Idir
3. "Lehaim encore un verre (2:59) - French version of "Sprayz ichmir")
4. "Adio Kerida" (3:51)
5. "De loin (Tzores)" (4:25) - duet with Yasmin Levy
6. "La Nuit" (4:02)
7. "Yalali" (3:05)
8. "Les Séfarades" (2:41)
9. "Mi corason" (3:03)
10. "Taht' el fil Yasmin" / "Lighrou Meni" (4:17)
11. "Paris tu m'as pris dans tes bras" (2:56) - duet with Théodore Bikel (Yiddish)
12. "Ne dis pas" (3:19) French adaptation of "Hirsh Glick" by Claude Zuffrieden)
13. "Shalom aleikhem" (2:51) - duet with Daniel Lévi
14. "Sprayz ichmir" (Noch ein glasses) (3:00)
