= Enrico Macias =

Algerian-French musician (born 1938)

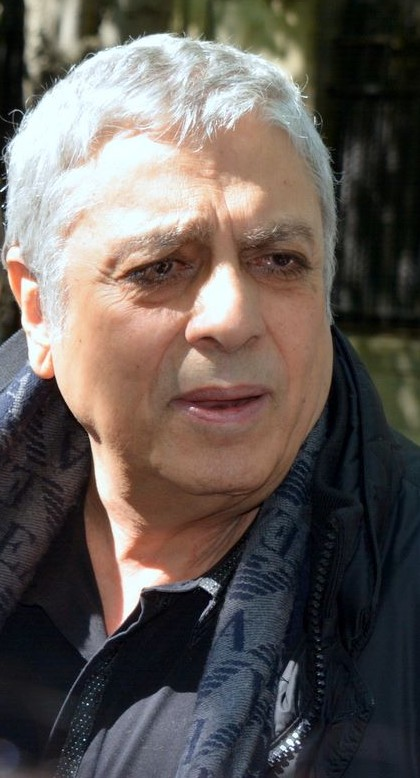
- Enrico Macias in 2016

Background information
- Born: Gaston Ghrenassia; 11 December 1938 (age 87); Constantine, French Algeria
- Genres: Chanson, Franco-Arab chanson
- Occupations: Composer, singer, songwriter
- Instrument: Guitar
- Years active: 1962–present
- Label: EMI
- Website: enricomacias.net

Gaston Ghrenassia (born 11 December 1938), known by his stage name Enrico Macias, is a French singer, songwriter and musician.

== Early years ==
Gaston Ghrenassia was born to a Sephardic Jewish family in Constantine, French Algeria. His father, Sylvain Ghrenassia (1914–2004), was a violinist in an orchestra that played primarily malouf, Andalusian classical music. Gaston played the guitar from childhood, and started playing with the Cheikh Raymond Leyris Orchestra at age 15.

He pursued a school teacher career, but continued playing the guitar. In 1961, the Algerian War of Independence was raging, and the situation became untenable for Europeans in Constantine. The assassination in 1961 of his father-in-law and musician Cheikh Raymond Leyris by the National Liberation Front (FLN) was of immense effect on Gaston Ghrenassia, and appears to have been due to his opposition to the independence of Algeria from France and pro-Israel stance. Gaston left Algeria with his wife, Suzy, on 29 July 1961, eleven months before the end of the Algerian War of Independence, and went into exile in mainland France. He has not been permitted to return to Algeria ever since.

== Career ==
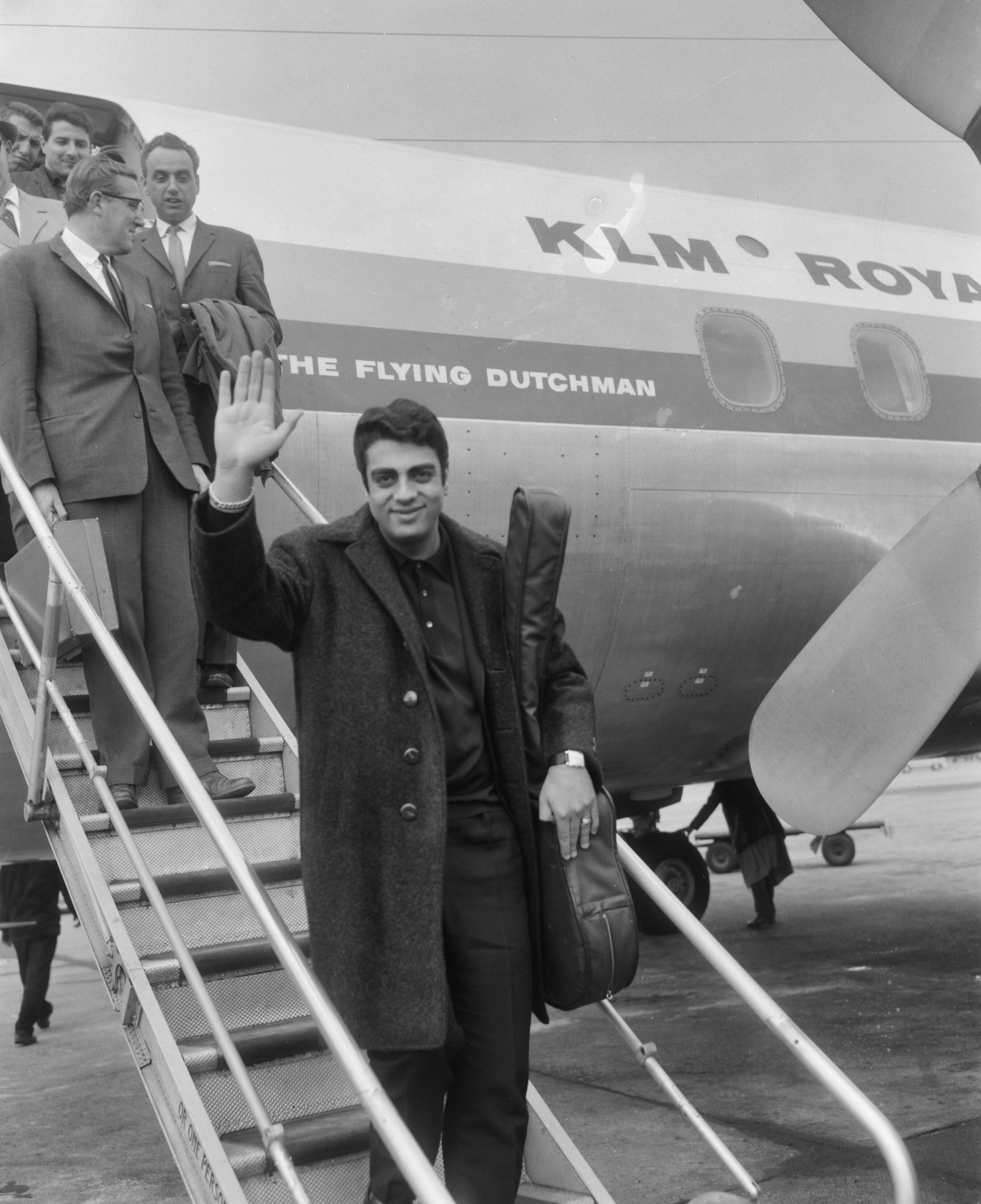
Macias (1965)

After living for a time in Argenteuil, he eventually moved to Paris, where he decided to pursue a music career. At first, he tried translating into French the malouf numbers which he already knew. Later on, he developed a new French repertoire that he performed in cafés and cabarets. He remained, though, a popular interpreter of Arab-Andalusian music and Judeo-Arab songs in France.

He adopted the stage name Enrico Macias and made his first recording in 1962 after a meeting with Raymond Bernard of Pathé. The result was the recording of "Adieu mon pays" ("Goodbye, my home country"), which he had composed for his beloved Algeria on the ship on his way to France. He appeared on French television and became an overnight sensation. This led to a first tour in 1963, opening for Paola and Billy Bridge. His daughter, Jocya, was born that year.

In the spring of 1964, he opened for Les Compagnons de la chanson at the Paris Olympia and then undertook a tour of Eastern Mediterranean countries, performing in Israel, Greece, and Turkey. In Turkey, many of his songs were translated and interpreted by Turkish artists. In 1965, he was awarded the Prix Vincent Scotto, and the following year he sang before 120,000 people at the Dinamo Stadium of Moscow, in a tour that took him to more than forty Soviet cities. He also toured Japan and recorded titles in Spanish and Italian.

His American debut, at a sold-out Carnegie Hall concert, took place on 17 February 1968. He continued to tour the United States, singing in Chicago, Dallas, and Los Angeles. In Quebec, Canada, he was warmly welcomed as a Francophone artist.

In 1971, he performed at the Paris Olympia, then at the Royal Albert Hall in London, and back to Japan, Canada, Italy, and Spain. A second US tour culminated in a concert at Carnegie Hall in 1972. In 1974, he gave ten shows at the Uris Theater on Broadway, and also at the Olympia for the sixth time since his debut there. He toured France and went twice to Israel in 1976 and 1978.

He was invited to Egypt by the Egyptian President Anwar El Sadat to sing for peace. This came after Macias had been banned from Arab countries for many years, despite keeping his popularity with Arab and ethnic audiences in the Middle East and North Africa. In Egypt, he sang in front of 20,000 people at the foot of the Pyramids. After Sadat's assassination, he wrote a song dedicated to the late president entitled "Un berger vient de tomber" ("A shepherd has just fallen").

In 1988, he had a big hit with "Zingarella", particularly in Israel and Turkey, which he toured in addition to South Korea.

In April 1992, he tried acting in a play adapted from the English repertoire, called Quelle Nuit (What a night). He also had a role as a local judge in the French TV film Monsieur Molina.

In July 2019, Macias played himself in the comedy Family Business, broadcast on Netflix.

He also wrote Hatikva's most famous recording, the Israeli anthem, recorded in 1993 for his album "À Suzy".

== Albums and singles ==
Of great popularity were his 1960s Oriental-influenced songs like "Adieu mon pays" (also known as "J'ai quitté mon pays"), "Les filles de mon pays", "L'Oriental", "Entre l'orient et l'occident" and tribute songs like "Le violon de mon père" (to his father), and "Mon chanteur préferé" (a tribute to his father-in-law Cheikh Raymond).

He was also popular with the French interpretation of "'Oh guitare, guitare" and the Spanish versions of "El Porompompero" and "Solenzara".

French hits include "Paris, tu m'as pris dans tes bras", "La femme de mon ami", "Non je n'ai pas oublié", "La France de mon enfance", "Les gens du nord" and "Les filles de mon pays".

He has sung in many languages including French, Italian, Spanish, Hebrew, Turkish, Greek, English, Armenian, Arabic and some of its dialects, as well as in Yiddish.

== Achievements ==
- In 1965 he was awarded the Prix Vincent Scotto.
- He received a gold disc in 1976 for "Mélisa".
- He was named Singer of Peace by UN Secretary-General Kurt Waldheim in 1980 after he donated the proceeds of his single "Malheur à celui qui blesse un enfant" to the UNICEF.
- In 1997, Kofi Annan named him Roving Ambassador for Peace and the Defence of Children.

== Collaborations ==
He has collaborated with numerous artists and his songs have been interpreted in many languages.

- He sang "Melisa", "Je t'apprendrai l'amour", "Un grand amour" and "On s'embrasse et on oublie" as a duet with internationally famous Turkish singer Ajda Pekkan and they released a live album called "A L'Olympia" together in 1976.
- In 1985, he collaborated with numerous artists to sing "Viva Les Bleus", a France national football team song to the 1986 FIFA World Cup in Mexico.
- In 1990, he had a duet with Killing Joke Jaz Coleman entitled "Minarets and Memories".
- In 1991, he had a duet with Ginni Gallan entitled "Un amour, une amie".
- In 2003, he sang "Koum Tara" with Cheb Mami featured in the latter's album Du Sud au Nord and again a live version, this time on Cheb Mami's 2004 album Live au Grand Rex
- In Turkey, many artists have interpreted his songs with Turkish lyrics including Ajda Pekkan, Başar Tamer, Berkant, Engin Evin, Ferdi Özbeğen, Gökben, Gönül Yazar, Hümeyra, İhsan Kayral, Juanito, Kamuran Akkor, Mavi Çocuklar, Nilüfer, Ömür Göksel, Selçuk Ural, Semiramis Pekkan, Seyyal Taner, Sezer Güvenirgil, Sibel Egemen, Tanju Okan, Yeliz

== Controversies ==
His decision to try to play concerts in Algeria resulted in huge controversy. After the cancellation of a proposed tour in Algeria in 2000, he wrote a book Mon Algérie, marketed as a "veritable love story between one man and his homeland".

On 14 February 2007, he announced his support of Nicolas Sarkozy for the French presidential elections. He confirmed his political convictions of the political left, but said he could not support the Socialist candidate Ségolène Royal, although he would have supported Laurent Fabius or Dominique Strauss-Kahn if they had been the candidates.

He attempted again unsuccessfully to visit Algeria in November 2007 accompanying French president Nicolas Sarkozy, but was faced with fierce resistance from several Algerian organizations and individuals, including Algerian Prime Minister Abdelaziz Belkhadem, due to Macias's support for Israel. He has never been permitted to return to Algeria since he left in 1961.

In September 2025, Turkish authorities banned Macias from performing at a concert in the Şişli district, Istanbul over his pro-Israeli stance and after "intense calls for protests against the concert." This came after Macias stated in an interview on YouTube in August: "My problem is that I can’t stand the violence of the terrorists, and if there was violence on the Israeli side, it was because of Hamas."

== Personal life ==
Enrico Macias is a widower. His wife Suzy Leyris suffered heart disease and died on 23 December 2008. His 1993 album Suzy is dedicated to her. He has a son Jean-Claude, who worked with him as a musician and a daughter named Jocya.

== Discography ==
=== Albums ===
Charts

Year	Album	Peak positions		Certification	Notes
Year	Album	BEL Wa	FR	Certification	Notes
2003	Oranges amères	–	31		Produced by his son, Jean-Claude Ghrenassia)
2005	Chanter	–	108		
2006	La vie populaire	–	30		
2011	Voyage d'une mélodie	77	44		Multilingual album in French, Spanish, Tamazight (Berber language), Arabic, Hebrew and Yiddish
2012	Venez tous mes amis!	75	39		Famous Macias songs in new arrangements and duo collaborations
2016	Les clefs	84	87		
2018	Enrico Macias & Al Orchestra	194	88		

==== Studio albums ====
- 1983: Deux ailes et trois plumes
- 1984: Générosité
- 1987: Enrico
- 1989: Le vent du sud
- 1991: Enrico
- 1992: Mon chanteur préferé
- 1993: Suzy
- 1994: La France de mon enfance
- 1995: Et Johnny Chante L'amour
- 1999: Aie Aie Aie Je T'Aime
- 1999: Hommage à Cheikh Raymond
- 2003: Oranges amères
- 2005: Chanter
- 2006: La Vie populaire
- 2011: Voyage d'une mélodie
- 2012: Venez tous mes amis!
- 2016: Les clefs
- 2019: Enrico Macias & Al orchestra

==== Live albums / compilations ====
- 1968: Olympia 68
- 1989: Olympia 89
- 1990: Disque d'Or
- 1992: Le plus grand bonheur du monde
- 1996: La Fête à l'Olympia
- 2003: Les Indispensables de Enrico Macias
- 2003: Concerts Musicorama
- 2006: Olympia 2003
- 2006: Les Concerts Exclusifs Europe
- 2008: Platinum Collection

=== Songs ===
(Macias songs in alphabetical order)

A

- A ceux qui m'ont béni 1981
- A la face de l'humanité 1972
- A Venise 1971
- Adieu mon pays 1962
- Aie aie aie je t'aime 1989
- Aime-moi je t'aime 1986
- Aimez vous les uns les autres 1977
- L'âme des gitans 1977
- Ami, dis lui 1965
- L'ami fidèle 1964
- L'amour c'est pour rien 1964
- L'amour de la famille 1978
- L'amour n'est jamais fini 1979
- Apprendre à vivre ensemble 1995
- Après moi 1989
- Asturias 1970
- Au cœur de la Camargue 1963
- Au nom des droits de l'homme 1993
- Au temps du Balajo 1970
- Aux quatre coins du monde 1968
- Aux talons de ses souliers 1968
- Avec les moyens du bord 1983

B

- La ballade des innocents 1987
- Beyrouth 1963
- Brésil 1995

C

- C'est ça l'amour 1973
- C'est du soleil 1971
- C'est une femme 1981
- C'est vrai 1980
- C'était le bon temps 1973
- Chanson pour l'auvergnat 1974/1997
- Chanter 1966
- Chiquita 1962
- Come on bye bye 1991
- Compagnon disparu 1963
- Constantina 1984
- Constantine 1962
- La courte échelle 1981

D

- Dans la nuit mexicaine 1963
- De musique en musique 1969
- Dès que je me réveille 1968
- Deux ailes et trois plumes 1983
- Deux femmes a Dublin 1976
- Dieu de l'espérance 1993
- Dis-moi ce qui ne va pas 1968
- Dis-moi l'avenir 1973
- Dix ans déjà 1970

E

- El Porompompero 1964
- Elle reviendra bientôt 1975
- L'Enfant de mon enfant (Mon petit Symon) 1993
- Enfants de tous pays 1963
- Entre l'orient et l'occident 1976
- Est-il un ennemi? 1965

F

- La femme de mon ami 1962
- La fête orientale 1971
- Les Filles de mon pays 1964
- La folle espérance 1977
- La France de mon enfance 1980
- Le fusil rouillé 1984

G

- Générosité 1984
- Les gens du nord 1967
- Le grain de blé 1966
- Le grand pardon 1997

I

- L'île du Rhône, 1964 ?
- Il est comme le soleil 1977
- L'instituteur 1981

J

- J'ai douze ans 1989
- J'ai peur 1967
- J'appelle le soleil 1966
- Jalousie maladie 1975
- Jamais Deux Sans Trois 1966
- J'en ai plein mon cœur des souvenirs 1966
- Je crois en Dieu 1971
- Je le vois sur ton visage 1967
- Je n'ai pas vu mes enfants grandir 1984
- Je t'aimerai pour deux 1966
- Je vous apporte la nouvelle 1975
- Jérusalem j'ai froid 1988
- Juif Espagnol 1980
- Jusqu'au bout de la course 1981

K

- Koum Tara 1976 + avec Cheb Mami (reprise) 1999

L

- La lavande 1967
- Luther King 1984
- La dernière prière 1996

M

- Ma maison, ma maison 1962
- Ma patrie 1964
- Ma raison de vivre 1964
- Malheur à celui qui blesse un enfant (Enrico Macias et Jacques Demarny) 1975
- La Marelle 1977
- Maya 1964
- Mélisa 1975
- Le mendiant de l'amour 1980
- La mère et l'enfant 1989
- Les millionnaires du dimanche 1967
- Mon ami mon frère 1963
- Mon chanteur préféré 1986
- Mon cœur d'attache 1966

N

- N'oublie jamais d'où tu viens 1967
- Ne doute plus de moi 1964
- Noël à Jérusalem 1967
- Non je n'ai pas oublié 1966
- Notre place au soleil 1965

O

- Oh guitare, guitare 1962
- Oranges amères 2003
- L'Oriental 1962
- Où est donc la vérité 1966
- Oumparere 1975
- Ouvre-moi la porte 1980
- Ouvre ta main et donne 1963

P

- Par ton premier baiser 1962
- Pardonne et n'oublie pas 1984
- Paris s'allume 1969
- Paris tu m'as pris dans tes bras 1964
- La part du pauvre 1966
- Les pins du bord de l'eau 1964
- Le plus grand bonheur du monde 1967
- Poï Poï 1963
- Pour ton mariage (chantée avec sa fille) 1992
- Puisque l'amour commande 1967

Q

- Quand les femmes dansent 2003
- Quand les hommes vivront d'amour, à l'Olympia en 1989 avec les Petits Chanteurs d'Asnières

R

- Reste-moi fidèle 1969

S

- Sans voir le jour 1965
- S'il fallait tout donner 1964
- Si c'était à refaire 1977
- Sois fidèle à ton amour 1974 avec Ilanit
- Solenzara 1967
- Sous le ciel de Paris 2005
- Souviens-toi des noëls de là bas 1963
- Souviens-toi, je t'aime aujourd'hui 1975
- Suzy 1993

T

- Toi la mer immense 1967
- Tous les hommes se ressemblent 1970
- Tous les soleils de l'amitié 1981
- Tout seul 1966
- Tu n'es pas seul au monde 2011

U

- Un amour, une amie 1990 avec Ginni Gallan
- Un berger vient de tomber 1981
- Un rayon de soleil 1967
- Un refrain 1967
- Un signe de la main 1975
- Un soir d'été 1963
- Une fille à marier 1982

V

- Va-t'en 1962
- Vagabonds sans rivage 1963
- Le Vent du sud 1989
- Vers qui vers quoi 1988
- Le Vertige 1974
- La vie populaire 2005
- Vieille terre 1965
- Le violon de mon père 1977
- Vous les femmes 1965
- Le Voyage 2003

Y

- Les yeux de l'amour 1967

Z

- Zingarella 1988

=== Featured in ===
Year	Single	Peak positions	Certification	Album
Year	Single	FR	Certification	Album
2003	"L'hymne à l'amour" (Aznavour, Boulay, Eicher, Biolay, Macias, Maurane, Foly, Fontaine, Mami, Leroy, Pagny & Badi)	50		

== Filmography ==
- 1965: L'Esbrouffe or Déclic et des claques directed by Philippe Clair – as himself
- 1978: Mamma Rosa ou La farce du destin directed by Raoul Sangla (TV mini-series)
- 2001: Would I Lie to You? 2 directed by Thomas Gilou – as Maurice Boudboul
- 2003: The Car Keys directed by Laurent Baffie – as a comedian
- 2005: Monsieur Molina directed by Thierry Binisti – as judge (TV series)
- 2006: Un ticket pour l'espace directed by Eric Lartigau – Enrico (voice)
- 2009: Coco directed by Gad Elmaleh as designer
- 2011: Bienvenue à bord directed by Eric Lavaine – as himself
- 2012: La Vérité si je mens! 3 by Thomas Gilou – as Maurice Boudboul
- 2012: Scènes de ménages – as a priest (TV series)
- 2019: Family Business – as himself (Netflix series)

Soundtracks

- 1967: Le parapluie des vedettes (TV movie) – singing "Les millionnaires du dimanche"
- 1994: Ha-Perah Be-Gani (documentary) – writing the music for "Marlène"
- 1994: Mina Tannenbaum – "Les filles de mon pays" (composer)
- 1998: A Soldier's Daughter Never Cries – writing and performing "Mon coeur d'attache"
- 2010: Axis of Evil (short film) – singing "J'ai quitté mon pays"
- 2011: The Rabbi's Cat – singing "Qu'elle ne se marie pas"
- 2011: Bachelor Days Are Over – writing and performing "Reste-moi fidèle"
- 2011: Bienvenue à bord – performing "Le mendiant de l'amour", "Les filles de mon pays", "Enfants de tous pays" and "Tu es le soleil de ma vie"

Documentaries

- 1966: Paris aktuell – as himself
- 2001: Tutti frutti – as himself
- 2003: Guerre d'Algérie: la mémoire retrouvée? – as himself
- 2003: Ombre et lumière – as himself
- 2005: Graffiti 60 – as himself
- 2005: Mamy Scopitone – L'âge d'or du clip – as himself (also archive footage)

== Bibliography ==
- Martin Monestier, Enrico Macias, l'enfant de tous pays, 1980
- Enrico Macias and Jacques Demarny, Non, je n’ai pas oublié, 1982
- Enrico Macias and Françoise Assouline, Mon Algérie, 2001
- Enrico Macia and Cheb Mami, Koum Tara Live Au Grand Rex, 2004
- Gérard Calmettes, Rien que du bleu, 2005
- Musicien de cœur, preface by Jacques Leyris, Éditions Horizon, 2005
- Armand Carval, Enrico Macias, Un homme libre pour la Paix (180 Pages), 2008
- Armand Carval, Enrico Macias, Le Chanteur de la Paix (200 pages), 2009
- Armand Carval, Enrico Macias, Le Chanteur de la Paix (180 pages), second edition, 2010
- Idir and Enrico Macias, Cnu ay afṛux (Achenu Aya Frukh) (le duo berbère Kabylie), 2011
- Enrico Macias, "L'envers du ciel bleu", 2015
