= Charbel Rouhana =

Lebanese musician

- Instrument: Oud
- Labels: Forward Music

Charbel Rouhana (Arabic: شربل روحانا) is a Lebanese oud player. Born in 1965 in Amsheet, a town north of Beirut, Charbel pursued his music education at the Holy Spirit University of Kaslik, obtaining his diploma in oud instrumentation in 1986 and his M.A. in Musicology in 1987. Rouhana is a proponent of "oud jazz", which combines Arabic oud music with a contemporary jazz backing.

== Discography ==
=== Studio albums ===
- 1997: Salamat
- 1998: Mada (with Hani Siblini)
- 2000: Mazaj Alani
- 2003: The Art of Middle Eastern Oud (out in Lebanon under the title Vice Versa)
- 2004: Sourat
- 2006: Dangerous
- 2008: Handmade
- 2010: Doux Zen Oud Duet with Ellie Khoury
- 2014: Tashweesh

=== DVDs ===
- 2008: Charbel Rouhana & the Beirut Oriental Ensemble: The "Handmade" Concert

=== Awards ===
- Winner of the First Prize at the 1990 Hirayama, Japan competition for the composition “Hymn of Peace”.

=== Concerts and participations ===
- 2010: Workshop+ playing at the first Egyptian Oud Forum
- 2009: Damascus Castle concert, Syria
- 2009: UNESCO ball, during the Celebration of Francophonie in Beirut.
- 2008: Roman amphitheater Concert, Jabla, Syria.
- 2003: Oud Forum, Jarash Festival, Damascus
- 2003: Workshop+ solo Playing at the Cairo Opera House
- 2003: An evening organized by the Lebanese Club, Prague, Czech Republic
- 2002: Oud Forum, Thessaloniki, Greece.
- 2002: Participation in the opening ceremony of the ninth Francophone Summit in Beirut.
- 2002: Lebanese week, Cahors, France.
- 2002: A music concert, Weimar, Germany.
- 2002: Music Without Borders, Dubai
- 2002: Composing music for the opening ceremony of the Dubai Shopping Festival
- 2001: Tenth Festival of faces of la Francophonie, Paris, France
- 2001: Souk Okaz, Jordan
- 2000: Oud Festival II, Tetouan, Morocco.
- 1999: Festival Belfort, France.
- 1998: Festival of Baalbek, Lebanon, participation in the evening of the Band "Sarband. "
- 1997: Medina Festival, Tunis, Solo Oud Performance.
- 1995: Al Bustan Festival, Lebanon, Solo Oud Performance.
- 1995: Beit Ed-dine Festival, Lebanon, participation in the "controversial" by Marcel Khalife.

Charbel composed music for the choreographer Abdel-Halim Caracalla’s shows: "2000 and 2 Nights" [2002], “Bi Laylat Qamar” [1999], “Andalusia, the Lost Glory” [1997], and “Elissa, Queen of Carthage” [1995]
