= May Matar =

Arabic singer, composer, and director (born 1987)

- Born: 8 October 1987 (age 38)
- Education: Bachelor in cinematography, masters in film studies
- Occupations: Singer, songwriter, composer, director.
- Years active: 2007–present
- Known for: Bel Mabda2 hit single
- Height: 170 cm (5 ft 7 in)
- Spouse: George Badawi (m. 2013; died 2017)
- Children: 2
- Awards: Belarusian Academy Award

May Matar (Arabic: مي مطر) is an Arabic singer, composer, and director. She was born in Kfaraakka, Lebanon, on October 8, 1987. Her debut single and music video "El Kawn Zghir" was released in 2007 and won an award from the Belarusian Academy in 2008. The same year, she released "Eh Gharali", which she composed and recorded alone. The song was well received and exceeded the success of her debut, reaching Melody's Top 20. "Ma fi Hada," written by Nizar Francis and composed by Samir Sfeir was released in 2009, and reached number one. The following year, she released "Metlak Mesh Ayzin", which was directed by Ziad Najjar. This song won the Best Social Song and Video Clip Award.

In 2018, after her husband's death, May performed a live concert at Gemmayze, where she released her first live-recorded album Kel shi bi zakerni fik on the label Anghami. She donated the proceeds from the concert to the Kids First Association. After taking a five-year break from video making, Matar published a single titled " Bla7za w Yawm", which was directed by Elie Berbary and reached the top five.

During the COVID-19 pandemic, Matar released her music video "Wahidi", which was directed by Valentina El khawand. "Wahidi" reached number one in Lebanon, Jordan, Palestine and Australia, and was one of the top hits in seven countries in the MENA region.

== Personal life ==
May Matar was born into a Lebanese family on October 8, 1987, in Kfaraakka, Koura, northern Lebanon. She is the eldest child of Maurice Matar and Zeina Sarraf, and has one sibling. On September 7, 2013, after a long relationship, Matar married George Badawi, a former Basketball player, in Beirut. Their duet "Osetna" was played as their first dance at their wedding. On January 19, 2016, Matar gave birth to twins Giorgio and Giovanni. During the same year, she released a song called "Alba Lal Mama", the music video for which was filmed and the couple's residence. On May 8, 2017, her husband George died from a sudden pulmonary embolism.

== Career ==
May Matar lived her first 18 years in Saudi Arabia, where her father worked. At the age of six, Matar started attending private piano and keyboard; three years later, after learning the piano basics, she began songwriting and composing. From the age of 14, Matar formed an oriental band AMA, which consisted of three members and became known for playing in local restaurants and events. Three years later, May ended AMA and planned to return to Lebanon to study.

In early 2006, Matar officially started considering a career in music. On 8 October 2007, "El Kawan Zghir", Matar's first single, was her birthday gift from her father. It was written and composed by Elie Zgheib, and got her an award from the Bielourussia Academy which recognized her as the most promising new coming artist of the year. Her second single "Eh Gharali" reached Melody's top 20. The video, which features the Lebanese actor Majdi Mashmoushi, reached high rankings on Arab television stations. Shortly after its release, May's third single and music clip "Ma Fi Hada" reached number one on the Lebanese pop charts. The song is a romantic ballad written by Nizar Francis and composed by Samir Sfeir. The video was directed by Bassem Moghniye and Matar.

In 2010, Matar released "Metlak mech 3ayzin" during which May responded to many press questions about the content of the song, whose video was directed by Ziad Najjar. This song won the Best Social Song and Video Clip Award. The following year, Matar founded the online marketing company Global Media Masters, which creates websites. In 2015, Matar performed the theme song "Layali 7azini" for the Lebanese Arabic television series “Solo El Layl El 7azin” that was broadcast on the Lebanese Broadcasting Company International (LBCI). Two years later, the Lebanese singer Brigitte Yaghi released her song "Bestahel", which was the first song written and composed by Matar for another artist.

In 2018, Matar held her first concert in Gemmayzeh. She released her first album Kel Shi B Zakerni Fik, which became an exclusive live album on Anghami. The proceeds of the concert went to Kids First Association. In 2019, one week before her second concert, Matar released her leading single "Blahza w Yawm". At her concert in Jdeideh, and after taking a five-year break from making videos, Matar officially released the music video of the single, which peaked in the Top Five. The proceeds of this concert were donated to the Rotary Club to fund their breast cancer project. In May 2020, Matar released her song "Akh Ya Deni" during the COVID-19 pandemic; she also released "Wahidi" on 6 May, in memory of her last road trip with George, her late husband. The clip was directed by Valentina Khawand, and was Khawand's music video debut. "Wahidi" peaked at number one in Lebanon, Jordan, Palestine, Morocco Syria and Australia, and charted in other countries, making the top five in Algeria and the top twelve in the United Arab Emirates. "Wahidi" was one of the top hits charted in eight countries in the MENA region and one in Oceania, two days after its release. May created several works in the year 2020, including "Ne7na", which was released one week before the 2020 Beirut explosion.

On New Year's Day, January 1, 2021, Matar took to social media and TV channels to celebrate the end of 2020 by releasing her new song "Bel Mabda2". Within a week of the song's release, "Bel Mabda2" became Lebanese Number 1 on OLT20. As a note that May Matar did land a couple of Top 10 Hits in the past with her songs “Ne7na”, and Wa7idi”. The video clip was directed by Valentina Khawand. In preparation for the video, Matar trained for about two and a half months.

== Sports ==
May Matar likes playing squash, and is a member of the Squash Federation in Lebanon. Matar participated in several local and international competitions, and in 2019 she won the awards "Lebanese Championship of Squash" and "Bahrain National Championship of Squash".

== Songs ==
- Kawn Zghir (2007)
- Eh Garali (2008)
- Mafi Hada (2009)
- Bahebak Aktar (2009)
- Metlak Mesh A'yzin (2010)
- Hayda Howwi (2011)
- Kent Hebbak w Battalt (2012)
- La Ya Albi (2012)
- Ya Aghla Men Dammi (2014)
- Layali Hazini (2015)
- Alba Lal Mama (2016)
- Zekrayat (2017)
- Bla7za W Yawm (2019)
- Akh Ya Deni (2020)
- Wahidi (2020)
- Ne7na (2020)
- Bel Mabda2 (2021)
