= Toufic Farroukh =

Lebanese jazz musician

- Occupations: Musician, composer

Toufic Farroukh (Arabic: توفيق فرّوخ) is a Lebanese jazz composer, working in France.

== Overview ==
Toufic Farroukh is a saxophone player and composer of jazz with a middle-eastern flavour stemming from his bi-cultural roots in Lebanon and France.

His brother, a saxophone player, guided him in learning to play the instrument and taught him the basics. He was an amateur who instilled in Toufic the love of professionalism. They had discovered the saxophone in the Boy Scouts. The instrument was strange to their environment; unconventional, and used only for certain occasions.

Farroukh moved from Beirut to Paris, where he studied music in the conservatory and in the Advanced College of Music, saxophone was his principal instrument. He did not study jazz and its roots at all, nor played jazz on the saxophone.

== Albums ==
- Ali on Broadway (1994)
- Little Secrets (1998)
- Drab Zeen (2002)
- Ali on Broadway / The other Mix (2004)
- Tootya (2007)
- Cinema Beyrouth (2011)
- "Little Secrets / the acoustic Mix" (2013)
- "Villes invisibles" (2017)

== Original soundtracks ==
- A ladder to Damascus (2013)
- un homme d'honneur (2011)
- Falafel (2006)
- Women Beyond Borders (2004)
- Terra incognita (2002)
- Tabaki (2001)
- Phantom Beirut (1998) ... aka Beyrouth fantôme (France)
- Ana El Awan (1994)
