= Ibn Thabit =

Libyan musician

Ibn Thabit is an anonymous hip-hop musician from Libya known for his anti-government songs during the 2011 civil war. He retired from music in late 2011, stating that with the fall of Gaddafi, he had achieved his goal and wished to contribute to Libya's rebuilding in other ways. Thabit has been living in Libya, where any form of dissent was banned by law by Muammar Gaddafi's regime. This could have resulted in his being arrested and imprisoned, which was the primary reason for his using an epithet to preserve his anonymity. Ibn Thabit's music is considered to have given a voice to Libyans who wished to express themselves politically and non-violently despite being disenfranchised. Dissenting cultural figures have been arrested and tortured in a number of countries during the Arab Spring.

Ibn Thabit considers himself to be an ordinary Libyan who is "speaking the thoughts of many Libyan youths." He describes himself as inspired by the people, telling a journalist from the Danish newspaper Information that he was more affected by conversations with fellow Libyans than by anything else. Not much is known about him other than that he is young, male and Libyan. He is thought to be from Tarhunah. Ibn Thabit was one of the early critics of Gaddafi in 2011, during the nascent movement building up to a full-fledged civil war after the Arab Spring protests.

'Al-Soo'al' (The Issue)

Muammar: You have never served the people
Muammar: You'd better give up
Confess. You cannot escape
Our revenge will catch you
As a train roars through a wall
We will drown you.

Popular music of a kind produced by Ibn Thabit represented the cultural face of the 2011 Libyan civil war. One of his works praises the city of Benghazi.

Ibn Thabit has his own website with support from people abroad on which many of his own songs and others produced in collaboration are freely available for download. On his website, Ibn Thabit claims that he has been "attacking Gaddafi" with music since 2008, when he posted his first song, "Moammar - the coward", on the internet.

Lyrics of the song "Al-Soo'al," released by Ibn Thabit on YouTube on 27 January 2011, weeks before the riots began in Libya, are indicative of the rebel sentiment. Ibn Thabit's music is featured in a compilation of Arabic Spring resistance rap songs by Khala labeled Khala's Mixtape Volume 1.

Ibn Thabit also has a podcast about reconciliation, an important though controversial subject on the Free Libya Podcast. Ibn Thabit uses the internet and social media platforms such as Facebook, YouTube, and Twitter, webcasting, podcasting and other means to spread his music and message. He regularly tweets about his music and news and broadcasts messages to the general populace. Ibn Thabit was the first Libyan blogger to blog in Amazigh, a language spoken by the Berber peoples of North Africa.

== Discography ==
Contributing artist

- The Rough Guide to Arabic Revolution (World Music Network, 2013)
