= Mustafa Said =

- Born: 1982 or 1983 (age 43–44)
- Origin: Egypt
- Genres: Arab traditional, Classic, Arab Tarab, Arabic music, Arabesque music, World Music, Middle Eastern music
- Years active: 1990–present
- Label: Forward Music

Mustafa Said (مصطفى سعيد) is an Egyptian singer, musicologist, composer and a virtuoso Oud player.

He has been living in Beirut since 2004. He has devoted his career to the classical Arabic repertoire while exploring new forms and new sounds.

A former professor at Cairo's House of Oud, Mustafa Said draws on East Mediterranean musical traditions, incorporating elements from historical periods such as the golden age of Abbasid music and 19th-century Middle Eastern styles. His compositions blend traditional forms with contemporary arrangements, placing a heavy focus on instrumental and vocal improvisation (Taqism).

Said has composed music for several documentaries and drama and participated in many local and international festivals as a solo performer or as part of an ensemble: Institute of the Arab World (2007), Mugam Festival in Azerbaijan (2009), Songs of Peace and Réconciliation conference in Indonesia (2009), Sounds of Arabia Festival in Abu Dhabi (2010), toured in Japan where he performed 17 concerts and conferences (2010), Fes Festival of World Sacred Music (2010). Mustafa Saïd is also the founder of the Asil Oriental Ensemble and is a lecturer in traditional Arabic ensemble music at the Higher Institute of Music, Antonine University (Lebanon) since 2006.

== Discography ==
Albums

- Rubaiyat El Khayyam (2008)
- Asil (2010)

Contributing artist

- The Rough Guide To Arabic Revolution (2013)
