= Zukra =

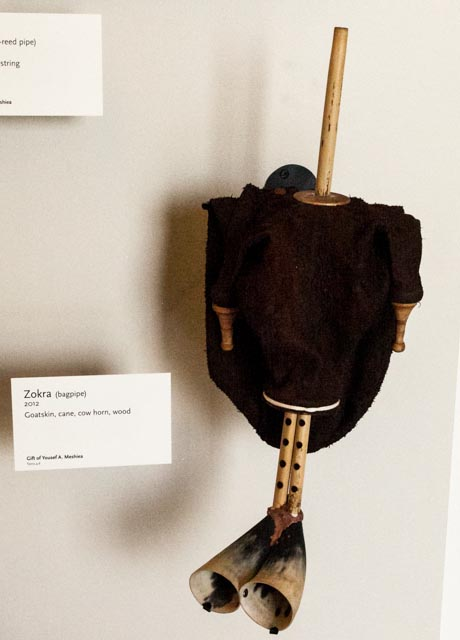
Zukra on display at the Musical Instrument Museum

The zukra (or zokra or zoughara, Arabic: زكرة) is a Libyan bagpipe with a double-chanter terminating in two cow horns; it is similar in construction to the Tunisian mizwad.

The instrument is played as a bagpipe in the south and west of Libya, but played by mouth without a bag (as a double clarinet) in the east. The instrument is played at feasts, weddings, and funerals.

== See also ==
- Mizwad
- Gaida
- Rhaita
- Mizmar (instrument)
