= Lena Chamamyan =

Syrian singer-songwriter

Lena Chamamyan لينا شماميان Լենա Շամամեան
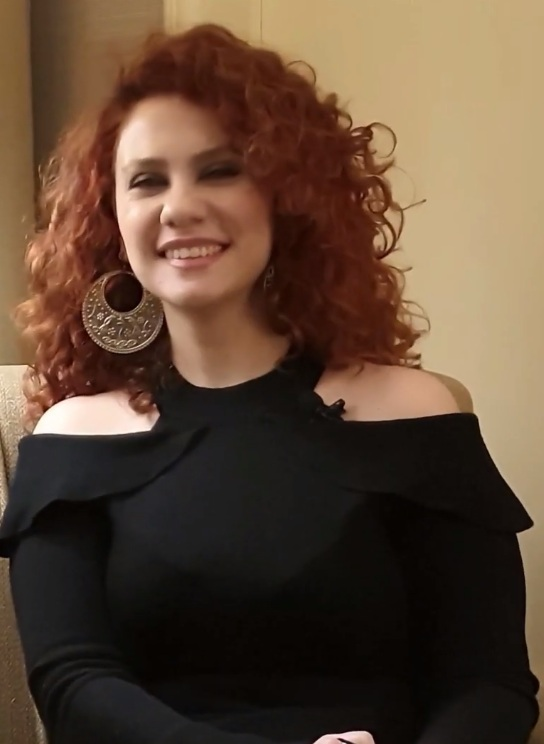
- Chamamyan in 2021

Background information
- Born: 27 June 1980 (age 45); Damascus, Syria
- Genres: Pop, jazz, folk
- Occupation: Singer
- Instruments: Vocals, piano
- Years active: 2005–present

Lena Chamamyan (Arabic: لينا شماميان; Armenian: Լենա Շամամեան; born 27 June 1980) is a Syrian singer-songwriter, known for her soprano voice and unique style, which fuses jazz, Arabic folk music and Western classical music.

== Personal life ==
Lena was born in Damascus to Artine Chamamyan, a Syrian-Armenian Catholic from Aleppo with roots from Marash, and Ghada, an Assyrian originally from Mardin. Her paternal great-grandfather, Sarkis Chamamyan, was a calligrapher, originally from Marash, Cilicia. She has said that his education and skills saved him and his family during the Armenian genocide, as the Ottoman army made use of his skills to write military communiqués and his life was spared. After the war, he and his family settled in Aleppo, along with a large number of Armenians who had been deported from Cilicia.

Her grandfather, Hovhannes Chamamyan, worked as a tailor in Aleppo and was a member of the Syrian Communist Party. While many of his friends and family repatriated to Soviet Armenia in 1947, Hovannes chose to remain in Aleppo. In the 1960s, as the Syrian government began cracking down on political dissidents, Hovhannes was arrested. His possessions were confiscated and he spent many years in prison. As a result, most of his children migrated to Canada, except for Artine, Lena's father, who chose to remain in Aleppo. After finishing his high school education, Artine received a scholarship to study engineering in Damascus, there he met his future wife, Ghada. The couple married in 1977 and Lena was born a few years later, in 1980.

Lena grew up with her identity split between her father's and her mother's community. As a child, she attended an Armenian Catholic school in the old city of Damascus, where she has stated that she had a hard time finding her place, as the children considered her only half-Armenian.

Chamamyan is multilingual and speaks four languages fluently: Arabic, Armenian, English and French.

== Musical career ==
=== Early years ===
Lena's interest in singing began at a young age. As a child, she sang in an Armenian church in the winter and in a Syriac church in the summer. Lena began studying basic music theory and solfège at the age of nine. Her first instrument was the xylophone.

Lena owes much of her early musical education and experience to her maternal grandmother and to her father. Her grandmother introduced her to classical singing and traditional Armenian music, while her father, a saxophonist, shared with her his love for the Armenian language and its music. At home, she grew up speaking Armenian with her father.

While finishing a degree in Financial Management at the University of Damascus in 2002, Chamamyan experienced problems in her relationship, she has said that her fiancé broke up with her on graduation day. This, Chamamyan has stated, led her to search for new ways to express herself, which led her back to the world of music. Chamamyan took part in a singing competition at the French Cultural Institute in Damascus, following which someone suggested that she study at the Conservatory for Music in Damascus.

Lena entered the High Institute of Music in Damascus and studied classical singing and classical piano. She has stated that she would have preferred to study jazz, but there was no such option at the conservatory. Lena stood out as a lyric soprano, a rare voice type in the Arab world. While studying at the conservatory, Lena started a musical project, travelling throughout the Syrian countryside with fellow students, seeking to combine jazz influences with the Oriental, Arab-Armenian musical heritage. This project eventually led to the production of her first two albums, Hal Asmar Ellon in 2006 and Shamat in 2007, in which she remixed new versions of traditional and classical Levantine songs, breathing new air into such well-known Arabic classics as Lamma Bada Yatathanna, a song based on an old Andalusian muwashshah and the titular Hal Asmar Ellon.

During her studies, Chamamyan also entered the Radio Monte Carlo's Middle Eastern music competition, the first of its kind, which she won in 2006. She graduated from the conservatory in 2007. At that time, she had already become one of the most famous female Arabic singers in the Middle East. In 2010, the Gulf-based Arabian Business Magazine ranked her as one of the 500 most influential figures in the Arab world.

In 2011, following the eruption of the Syrian Civil War, Chamamyan relocated to Paris, where she currently lives and creates her music.

=== Later years ===
Following her relocation to Paris, Chamamyan's music continued to develop. While in France, she began to study jazz piano, and she began writing and composing her own music. Her music continued to take inspiration from folk music and especially from her Syrian-Armenian roots. In her 2013 album, Ghazl El Banat, Chamamyan's musical style came to maturity as she showed her full range of musical talent, which includes writing, composing, producing, playing instruments, and singing.

Chamamyan has performed throughout Europe and the Middle East, from London to Geneva and from Cairo to Beirut, even performing in the Gulf countries and Turkey. In 2014, she took part as a jury member and special guest in "Tsovits Tsov – ArmVision 2014", an international contest for Armenian music at the Kremlin Theatre in Moscow, which gathered Armenian musicians from all over the world. This led Chamamyan to a collaboration with French-Armenian songwriter and jazz pianist André Manoukian. Together they produced in 2015 a version of Moutn Er (Black Sky), an Armenian poem by Hovannes Toumanian, in honor of the 100th anniversary of the Armenian genocide.

Her fourth album, LAWNAN (Two Colors), came out in 2016, born out of a three-year collaboration with Turkish composer and kanun player Göksel Baktagir. Chamamyan has described the album as "a pure partnership between people who chose to unite [in] music...despite the pain of life divid[ing] us, about love and longing for home, about the exile inside and outside".

Chamamyan has also shown an interest in social issues. In October 2012, she pulled out of the Salam Orient Festival in Vienna, along with several other artists, after being informed by BDS activists that the festival was being sponsored by the Israeli government. She has been active with Syrian refugees in Germany and has been vocal in her support for them. Her 2019 single, "I am Syrian", describes the experience of a Syrian living in exile.

== Musical style ==
Chamamyan's music is known for its fusion of Arabic and Armenian folk songs together with Western classical music and modern styles, such as jazz. In her style of singing, she has stated that she was strongly influenced by Lebanese singer Fairuz, who revolutionized Arabic singing styles with her extensive use of her "head voice".

Throughout her musical work, Chamamyan sings mainly in Arabic and Armenian. Chamamyan has stated in interviews that the multilingual nature of her music is significant and important to her, and she hopes to perform in more languages in the future. Lena remains close to her Armenian roots, both cultural and musical, and includes an Armenian folk song in each of her albums and concerts. Chamamyan is known for her style of combining folkloric music with modern styles and arrangements, crossing genres and creating a new fusion of both the traditional and the new. She has stated that she keeps an open mind when it comes to musical style. She sees music as a universal language and takes inspiration from all sorts of musical genres, including the Portuguese fado and the Spanish-Andalusian flamenco.

== Discography ==
=== Albums ===
- Hal Asmar Ellon (2006)
- Shamat (2007)
- Ghazl El Banat (2013)
- Lawnan (2016)

=== Singles ===
- Khayt El Kassab (2015)
- Shwey W Byehda El Omer (2015)
- Sareri Hovin Mernem (2016)
- Yakhi Ana Souriyeh (2019)
- Remember (2020)

=== Soundtracks ===
- Nizar Qabbani (2005)
- Grandma's Tattoos (2011)
- Love in Damascus (2017)
- Han3esh w Nshof (2020) for Egyptian TV series "Ella Ana"
