= Ma'luf =

Andalusian music genre

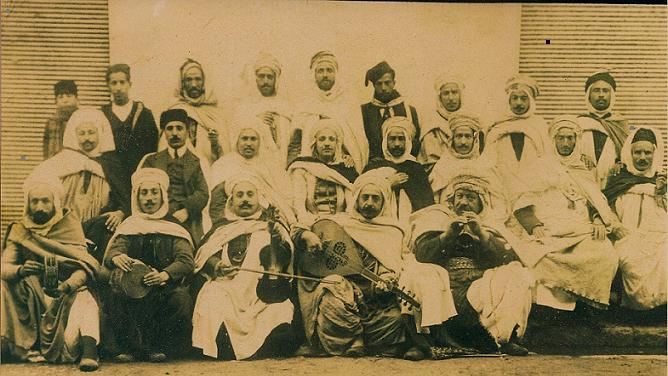
Maluf orchestra in Constantine with Hamou Fergani and his ensemble, early 20th century

Ma'luf (Arabic: مألوف, romanized: acquainted, customary) is a genre of art music in the tradition of the classical music of Al-Andalus and exists both in Eastern Algeria, Tunisia and Libya. Its origins have been traced to Muslim culture in Al-Andalus, and it was later introduced to the Maghreb by Andalusi refugees.

== History ==
The Arabic word ma'luf means 'familiar' or 'customary'. In Tunisia, it refers to the country's Andalusian musical tradition. Like similar musical genres of Morocco, Algeria, and Libya, ma'luf had its origins in the Islamic courts and cities of medieval Iberia (Al-Andalus). Following the Christian Reconquista, this musical tradition reached the Maghreb through the migration of Muslim and Jewish refugees.

== See also ==
- Tunisian ma'luf
